= World Team Chess Championship 1985 =

- Location: Lucerne, Switzerland
- Dates: 15–28 November 1985
- Competitors: 10 teams
- Winning score: 37.5 points of 54

Champion
- Soviet Union

World Team Chess Championship 1985 – is a chess event, which took place from 15 to 28 November 1985.

== Participating teams ==
Qualification path	Team
Chess Olympiad	England
Chess Olympiad	Hungary
Chess Olympiad	Romania
Chess Olympiad	West Germany
Chess Olympiad	France
European Team Chess Championship 1983	Soviet Union
Asian Team Chess Championship 1983	China
Pan-American Team Chess Championship 1985	Argentina
African nominee	African Union
Host	Switzerland

== Rosters ==
№ 1	Soviet Union	Rating	№ 2	Hungary	Rating	№ 3	England	Rating	№ 4	Argentina	Rating	№ 5	West Germany	Rating
1	Anatoly Karpov (Russia)	2720	1	Lajos Portisch (Hungary)	2625	1	Anthony Miles (England)	2560	1	Oscar Panno (Argentina)	2505	1	Eric Lobron (West Germany)	2525
2	Artur Yusupov (Russia)	2600	2	Zoltan Ribli (Hungary)	2605	2	John Nunn (England)	2600	2	Miguel Quinteros (Argentina)	2525	2	Helmut Pfleger (West Germany)	2490
3	Rafael Vaganian (Armenia)	2625	3	Gyula Sax (Hungary)	2535	3	Jon Speelman (England)	2530	3	Carlos Garcia Palermo (Argentina)	2515	3	Stefan Kindermann (West Germany)	2480
4	Andrei Sokolov (Russia)	2555	4	Jozsef Pinter (Hungary)	2565	4	Nigel Short (England)	2575	4	Daniel Campora (Argentina)	2440	4	Ralf Lau (West Germany)	2460
5	Alexander Beliavsky (Ukraine)	2640	5	Andras Adorjan (Hungary)	2535	5	Jonathan Mestel (England)	2535	5	Gerardo Barbero (Argentina)	2455	5	Hans-Joachim Hecht (West Germany)	2445
6	Vassily Smyslov (Russia)	2595	6	Ivan Farago (Hungary)	2510	6	Murray Chandler (England)	2525	6	Jorge Rubinetti (Argentina)	2440	6	Klaus Bischoff (West Germany)	2415
1st reserve	Alexander Chernin (Russia)	2560	1st reserve	Istvan Csom (Hungary)	2465	1st reserve	James Plaskett (England)	2480	1st reserve	Jorge Gómez Baillo (Argentina)	2295	1st reserve	Gerald Hertneck (West Germany)	2410
2nd reserve	Lev Polugaevsky (Belarus)	2600	2nd reserve	Atilla Grandpierre (Hungary)	2445	2nd reserve	Glenn Flear (England)	2475	2nd reserve	Guillermo Soppe (Argentina)	2370	2nd reserve	Klaus Darga (West Germany)	2470
	Average rating	2630		Average rating	2563		Average rating	2554		Average rating	2480		Average rating	2478
№ 6	France	Rating	№ 7	Romania	Rating	№ 8	Switzerland	Rating	№ 9	China	Rating	№ 10	African Union	Rating
1	Boris Spassky (France)	2590	1	Mihai Șubă (Romania)	2505	1	Viktor Korchnoi (Switzerland)	2630	1	Qi Jingxuan (China)	2485	1	Assem Afifi (Egypt)	2355
2	Bachar Kouatly (France)	2470	2	Florin Gheorghiu (Romania)	2515	2	Werner Hug (Switzerland)	2450	2	Li Zunian (China)	2465	2	Slaheddine Hmadi (Tunisia)	2250
3	Aldo Haïk (France)	2440	3	Theodor Ghițescu (Romania)	2450	3	Heinz Wirthensohn (Switzerland)	2425	3	Ye Jiangchuan (China)	2465	3	Kamel Skalli (Morocco)
4	Merchad Charif (France)	2430	4	Dan Barbulescu (Romania)	2450	4	Dieter Keller (Switzerland)	2410	4	Xu Jun (China)	2205	4	Abderahmane Busmaha (Algeria)	2205
5	Jean-Luc Seret (France)	2440	5	Mihail-Viorel Ghindă (Romania)	2430	5	Fernand Gobet (Switzerland)	2360	5	Lin Ta (China)	2240	5	Alexandre Nascimento (Angola)
6	Olivier Renet (France)	2420	6	Valentin Stoika (Romania)	2420	6	Markus Trepp (Switzerland)	2410	6	Ye Rongguang (China)	2340	6	Theophil Kayafas (Nigeria)
1st reserve	Marc Santo-Roman (France)	2350	1st reserve	Sergiu Gruenberg (Romania)	2400	1st reserve	Giancarlo Franzoni (Switzerland)	2330	1st reserve	Wu Sibing (China)		1st reserve
2nd reserve	Gilles Miralles (France)	2370	2nd reserve	Constantin Ionescu (Romania)	2430	2nd reserve	Matthias Rufenacht (Switzerland)	2265	2nd reserve			2nd reserve
	Average rating	2465		Average rating	2463		Average rating	2448		Average rating	2367		Average rating	2243

== Results by round ==
Round 1
Soviet Union	0	3½:2½	0	Romania
France	0	1½:4½	0	Hungary
Argentina	0	2½:3½	0	China
Switzerland	0	3:3	0	Germany
African Union	0	0:6	0	England
Round 4
Argentina	7	1½:4½	13	Soviet Union
Romania	10	3½:2½	12½	England
Hungary	11½	4:2	9½	Germany
France	7	4½:1½	9	Switzerland
China	8	5½:½	2½	African Union
Round 7
African Union	5	0:6	24	Soviet Union
Switzerland	16	2½:3½	23½	Hungary
England	23	3½:2½	16	Argentina
Romania	19	3½:2½	18½	China
Germany	16½	2½:3½	18½	France

Round 2
Hungary	4½	3½:2½	6	England
China	3½	1:5	3½	Soviet Union
Romania	2½	2½:3½	3	Switzerland
France	1½	4:2	2½	Argentina
Germany	½	4½:1½	0	African Union
Round 5
Soviet Union	17½	2½:3½	15½	Hungary
England	15	4:2	13½	China
Switzerland	10½	3½:2½	8½	Argentina
Germany	11½	2:4	13½	Romania
African Union	3	1:5	11½	France
Round 8
Soviet Union	30	4:2	26½	England
Hungary	27	2½:3½	21	China
France	22	3:3	22½	Romania
Argentina	18½	4:2	19	Germany
Switzerland	18½	5:1	5	African Union

Round 3
Soviet Union	8½	4½:1½	4½	France
Argentina	4½	2½:3½	8	Hungary
Switzerland	6½	2½:3½	4½	China
England	8½	4:2	7½	Germany
African Union	1½	1:5	5	Romania
Round 6
Soviet Union	20	4:2	14	Switzerland
Hungary	19	4½:1½	17½	Romania
France	16½	2:4	19	England
China	15½	3:3	13½	Germany
Argentina	11	5:1	4	African Union
Round 9
Germany	21	2½:3½	34	Soviet Union
England	28½	2:4	23½	Switzerland
China	24½	2½:3½	25	France
Romania	25½	3:3	22½	Argentina
African Union	6	1:5	29½	Hungary

== Crosstable ==
Place	Team	Av. rating	1	2	3	4	5	6	7	8	9	10	Points	+	=	−
Gold	Soviet Union	2630		2½	4	4½	3½	4	5	4½	3½	6	37½	8	0	1
Silver	Hungary	2563	3½		3½	4½	4½	3½	2½	3½	4	5	34½	8	0	1
Bronze	England	2554	2	2½		4	2½	2	4	3½	4	6	30½	5	0	4
4	France	2465	1½	1½	2		3	4½	3½	4	3½	5	28½	5	1	3
5	Romania	2463	2½	1½	3½	3		2½	3½	3	4	5	28½	4	2	3
6	Switzerland	2448	2	2½	4	1½	3½		2½	3½	3	5	27½	4	1	4
7	China	2367	1	3½	2	2½	2½	3½		3½	3	5½	27	4	1	4
8	Argentina	2480	1½	2½	2½	2	3	2½	2½		4	5	25½	2	1	6
9	Germany	2478	2½	2	2	2½	2	3	3	2		4½	23½	1	2	6
10	African Union	2243	0	1	0	1	1	1	½	1	1½		7	0	0	9
