= Roza Lallemand =

French chess player (1961–2008)

Personal information
- Born: 8 August 1961 Pyongyang, North Korea
- Died: 26 August 2008 (aged 47) Pau, France

Chess career
- Country: Soviet Union → Russia (before 1998); France (after 1998)
- Title: Woman Grandmaster (2000)
- Peak rating: 2347 (July 2001)

Roza Lallemand (8 August 1961 – 26 August 2008) was a North Korean-born French chess player. She was European chess champion in 2001 and represented France several times at the Chess Olympiad.

== Life ==
Roza Te was born in North Korea in 1961. She had five siblings. When she was five years old the whole family emigrated to the Soviet Union apart from her mother, who moved to South Korea and would only be allowed to rejoin her family after many years. The separation was very difficult for the young Roza.

Seen to be a good chess player, Roza Te was sent to Moscow at the age of 11 to attend a school reserved for young chess players with high potential. She would only see her family every six months. These separations from her family gave her a certain firmness of character and reserved attitude to strangers she would keep all her life. She studied Russian literature while continuing with chess and graduated as a librarian and a "master of sports" in chess. After the fall of the Berlin Wall in 1989, Roza Te began to participate in tournaments in Western Europe. She met her husband, Daniel Lallemand, and obtained French nationality in 1997.

Roza Lallemand died in August 2008 of a heart attack after returning from the French Chess Championship, where she finished sixth in the Women's National, a competition that seems to have made her very tired. The French Chess Federation commemorated her in 2009 by calling the women's fast games championship of France the "Trophée Roza Lallemand".

== Career ==
=== Individual ===
In 2000 Roza Lallemand became the first female French international grandmaster after Chantal Chaudé de Silans, who had obtained the honorary title in recognition of her performance when the official title did not yet exist. She finished third in the French Chess Championship in 2000 and 2003 .

=== Team ===
Roza Lallemand participated several times in the Chess Olympiad in the French women's team. In 2000, her team finished 39th, in 2002 they finished 24th and in 2006 they finished 18th. Lallemand became European women's team champion in 2001 in León, Spain. (Note: The two other players on the French women's team were Marie Sebag and Maria Leconte.) Russia and Armenia did not compete. Her Elo ranking was then 2287 and she achieved a tournament performance of 2333. Lallemand also participated in 2005 in the European Team Chess Championship in Gothenburg, where her team finished 16th and where, with a ranking of 2287 she achieved a performance of 2311 points.

Roza Lallemand played for the Monaco Chess Club from 1999 to 2006, where she played in the Top 16 (first division of French interclub competition). The team was champion of France in 2001 and 2002 and vice-champion in 2004 and 2006. She then played for the Bischwiller Club in 2007 and 2008.

== Playing style ==
Roza Lallemand had a predilection for the Open Game, and often opened with 1. e4.

She was considered a free player, with a "high" game and a good sense of initiative. Gilles Mirallès described her after she died as "capable of carrying out sudden attacks" and wrote that she was "feared for her brilliant sacrifices." He saw her as representing a "romantic" spirit of chess that had become all too rare in the modern age.

== Notable game ==
Position: a8 black rook, c8 black rook, e8 black bishop, h8 black king, b7 black queen, e7 black bishop, f7 black pawn, g7 black pawn, h7 black pawn, d6 black pawn, e6 black pawn, h6 white bishop, h5 white pawn, d4 white knight, h4 white pawn, a3 white pawn, b3 black pawn, f3 white pawn, b2 white pawn, d2 white queen, b1 white king, d1 white rook, g1 white rook

Position after 24. Bh6!

A game played by Roza Lallemand (white) against Maia Lomineishvili at the fourth round of chess in the European Championship of Nations in Gothenburg in 2005. Lomineishvili was a member of the Georgian team that finished second in these Olympics.

1. e4 c5 2. Nf3 Nc6 3. Bb5 d6 4. d4 cxd4 5. Qxd4 Bd7 6. Bxc6 Bxc6 7. Nc3 Nf6 8. Bg5 e6 9. O-O-O Be7 10. Rhe1 O-O 11. Qd2 Qa5 12. Kb1 Qa6 13. Nd4 Rfc8 14. f3 Be8 15. h4...

It is clear that both sides wish to attack.

15. ...b5 16. g4 b4 17. Nce2 Qb7 18. Ng3 a5 19. Rg1 a4 20. Nh5 Nxh5 21. gxh5 b3 22. cxb3 axb3 23. a3 Kh8

By this move the blacks are trying to defend themselves against the arrival of the bishop in h6 but...

24. Bh6! ...

The precautions of the blacks against this blow will not have been enough.

Position: a8 black rook, c8 black rook, e8 black bishop, f8 black king, b7 black queen, f7 black pawn, h7 black pawn, d6 black pawn, e6 black pawn, f5 white knight, h5 white pawn, e4 white pawn, h4 white pawn, a3 white pawn, b3 black pawn, f3 white pawn, b2 white pawn, d2 white queen, b1 white king, g1 white rook

Position after 28. Nf5

24. ...Bf6?

Not wanting to weaken their king, the blacks refuse to play g6, which would no doubt have been better.

25. Bxg7+...

!!

25. ...Bxg7 26. Rxg7 Kxg7 27. Rg1+ Kf8 28. Nf5 Rc1+ 29. Rxc1 exf5 30. Qxd6+ 1-0

This game shows the precision of Roza Lallemand's play and her taste for a game of attack as well as tactics and combinations.

== Sources ==
- "15th European Team Championship 2005 - Women Gothenburg, Sweden, Mannschaftsaufstellung für Föderation FRA", Wiener Zeitung (in German), 7 August 2005
- Bouton, Christophe (26 August 2008), "Décès de Rosa Lallemand", Échecs64 (in French)
- Décès de Roza Lallemand (in French), FFE: Fédération Française des Échecs, 1 September 2008
- "Hommage à Roza Lallemand" (PDF), Échecs et mat (in French) (95): 7, September–October 2008, ISSN 1259-3451
- Lallemand, Daniel (October 2008), "À mon épouse Roza", Europe Échecs (in French) (581)
- Leconte, Maria; Skripchenko, Almira (September–October 2008), "Maria Leconte et Almira Skripchenko commentent une partie de Roza" (PDF), Échecs et mat (in French) (95), ISSN 1259-3451
- "Les filles championnes d'Europe, les garçons vice-champions !", Échecs et mat (in French) (48): 6–7, December 2001, ISSN 1259-3451
- Mirallès, Gilles (October 2008), "Une Dame d'esprit romantique", Europe Échecs (in French) (581): 53
- "Olympiades de Turin - Ronde 13", Europe Échecs, 2006
- Rapaire, Jean-Michel (2008), "Roza Lallemand", Monaco Chess Club, archived from the original on 5 October 2008
- Trophée Roza Lallemand - 20 et 21 juin 2009 - à Rennes (in French), FFE: Fédération Française des Échecs, 20 June 2009
