= Vladislav Tkachiev =

Kazakhstani-French chess grandmaster (born 1973)

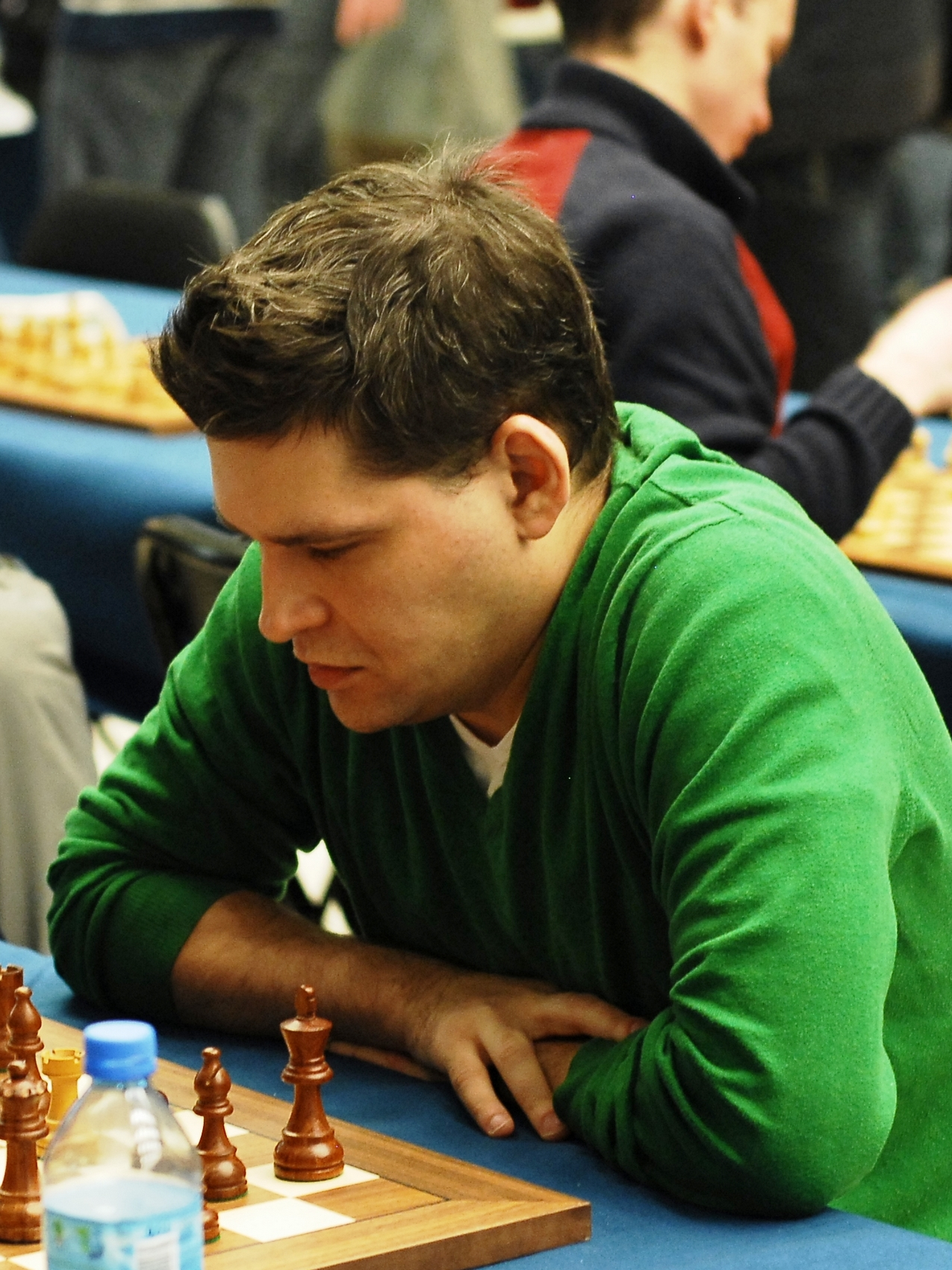
- Tkachiev in 2012

Personal information
- Born: Владислав Ткачёв; November 9, 1973 (age 52) Moscow, Russian SFSR, USSR

Chess career
- Country: Soviet Union → Kazakhstan (until 2006); France (since 2006)
- Title: Grandmaster (1995)
- FIDE rating: 2660 (July 2026)
- Peak rating: 2672 (January 2001)
- Peak ranking: No. 21 (January 2000)

Vladislav Ivanovich Tkachiev (Russian: Владислав Иванович Ткачёв, French: Vladislav Ivanovitch Tkatchyov, born November 9, 1973) is a Russian-born Kazakhstani-French chess grandmaster.

== Biography ==
In 1982, he moved to Kazakhstan with his parents and learnt to play chess a year later. A winner of the Kazakhstani Youth Championship in 1985, he went on to represent Kazakhstan at the 1992 Chess Olympiad in Manila and was twice the national champion.

International Master and Grandmaster titles were awarded to him in 1993 and 1996 respectively. Now living in Cannes, Tkachiev has taken French citizenship and won the 2006 French Chess Championship, held at Besançon, August 14–26. His victory included a rapid play-off win against Laurent Fressinet.

In 2007, he won the European Individual Chess Championship, held in Dresden, following a play-off with GMs Emil Sutovsky, Dmitry Jakovenko and Ivan Cheparinov.

He also reached the semi-finals of the Russian Chess Championship in 2005 and won the Moscow Blitz Superfinal in 2004, ahead of Alexander Morozevich. Other victories include Oakham 1993, Cannes 1996 (and 1999), Isle of Man 1996 and Makarska 1997.

In matchplay, he has defeated Alberto David 6-2 (+4=4) in 1999 and beat Dutch grandmaster John van der Wiel by 7-3 (+5=4-1). In 2000, his (Cannes) match against Jeroen Piket ended in a 4–4 draw (+2=4-2). In 2013 Tkachiev won the Nancy stage of the French Rapid Grand Prix.

Tkachiev has been open about the fact that his personal lifestyle makes it hard for him to stay focused during long, multi-day chess at time controls tournaments . Because of this he prefers blitz chess and this makes him win tournaments.

In September 2009, Tkachiev caused controversy after falling asleep during a match at an international tournament in Calcutta, India. He was reportedly intoxicated and, after passing out repeatedly during the first hour of play, was forced to forfeit the game after eleven moves on technical grounds.

== Notable games ==
- Viswanathan Anand vs Vladislav Tkachiev, FIDE WCh KO 2001, Spanish Game: Morphy Defense (C78), 1/2-1/2
- Alexander Morozevich vs Vladislav Tkachiev, World Cup of Rapid Chess Gp B 2001, Scotch Game: Classical, Intermezzo Variation (C45), 0-1
- Evgeny E Vorobiov vs Vladislav Tkachiev, 58th Russian Championship Semi-Finals 2005, Scotch Game: Classical, Intermezzo Variation (C45), 0-1
- Vladislav Tkachiev vs Maxime Vachier Lagrave, French Championships 2006, English Opening: Anglo-Indian Defense. King's Knight Variation (A15), 1-0

== Blitz Brothers ==
On the less serious side of chess, Vladislav Tkachiev is one half of a duo, known as the "Blitz Brothers", responsible for setting up the World Chess Beauty Contest. With the intention of promoting chess worldwide and attracting the interest of media and sponsors, Vladislav and his brother Evgeny created a website that hosted the competition. Although the site is currently offline, viewers were able to register to see the full size images and vote for their favourites.

Whilst the contest was controversial in some quarters and considered to be degrading by some female chess players, the not-too-revealing photographs were mostly sent in by the participants themselves. A judging panel was made up of a wider selection of chess grandmasters, including Nigel Short, who along with some women players like Jennifer Shahade, supported the idea behind the venture. Amongst the more noted chess players featured in the contest were Natalija Pogonina, Maria Manakova, Almira Skripchenko and Elisabeth Pähtz.
