= Adolphe Silbert =

French chess player

Adolphe Silbert was a French chess master.

He won at Arcachon 1902 (the first French Amateur championship). He lived in Paris, where he played in many tournaments at La Régence. He took 5th in 1896, tied for 4-5th in 1902 (Dawid Janowski won), took 3rd in 1905 (Jean Taubenhaus won), took 2nd in 1908, took 5th in 1909, took 4th in 1910, took 3rd in 1912, shared 2nd in 1914, and took 2nd, behind Arnold Aurbach, in 1917. He lost a match to A. Aurbach (1 : 3) and won against H. Weinstein (3.5 : 1.5), both in 1907.

He shared 2nd at Nice 1925 (French Chess Championship, Robert Crépeaux won), and tied for 10-11th at La Baule 1932 (FRA-ch, Maurice Raizman won).
