= Women's World Chess Championship 1933 =

Women's world cup chess tournament

The 4th Women's World Chess Championship took place during the 5th Chess Olympiad, held in Folkestone, England from 12 to 23 June 1933. The competition was played as a double round-robin tournament. Vera Menchik successfully defended her title. The final results were as follows:

#	Player	1	2	3	4	5	6	7	8	Total
1	Vera Menchik (TCH)	-	1 1	1 1	1 1	1 1	1 1	1 1	1 1	14
2	Edith Charlotte Price (ENG)	0 0	-	1 ½	0 ½	1 1	0 1	1 1	1 1	9
3	Mary Gilchrist (SCO)	0 0	0 ½	-	1 1	1 ½	½ ½	1 ½	1 1	8½
4	Edith Michell (ENG)	0 0	1 ½	0 0	-	½ 1	1 1	0 1	1 1	8
5	Alice Tonini (ITA)	0 0	0 0	0 ½	½ 0	-	1 1	0 1	1 1	6
6	Paulette Schwartzmann (FRA)	0 0	1 0	½ ½	0 0	0 0	-	1 ½	1 1	5½
7	Jeanne D'Autremont (FRA)	0 0	0 0	0 ½	1 0	1 0	0 ½	-	1 1	5
8	Gisela Harum (AUT)	0 0	0 0	0 0	0 0	0 0	0 0	0 0	-	0
