= Emmanuel Bricard =

French chess grandmaster (born 1966)

Personal information
- Born: May 4, 1966 (age 60) Versailles, Yvelines, France

Chess career
- Country: France
- Title: Grandmaster (2005)
- Peak rating: 2511 (September 2011)

Emmanuel Bricard is a French chess grandmaster.

== Chess career ==
Bricard began playing chess at age 12.

Bricard won the 1993 French Chess Championship, and finished third in the championship of the following year, behind Marc Santo-Roman and Manuel Apicella.

Bricard is also a chess coach, teaching at the Nîmes chess club. In October 2017, he traveled to Tahiti to tutor children in chess.
