= Monte Carlo chess tournament =

The Monte Carlo chess tournament was established in 1901. This was a series of very strong chess tournaments held in Monte Carlo, from 1901 to 1904, and again after a long break from 1967 to 1969.

== 1901 ==
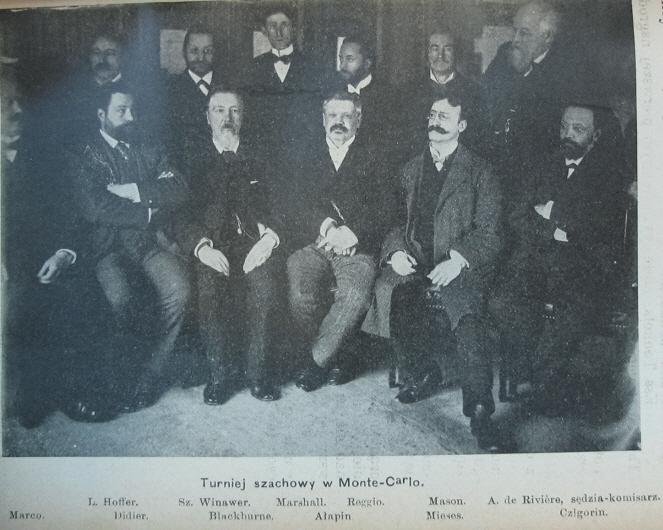
Players ranked 4th–14th at Monte Carlo 1901

#	Player	1	2	3	4	5	6	7	8	9	10	11	12	13	14	Total	Wins
1	Dawid Janowski (France)	—N/a	1	1	1	0	1	1	1	1/2	3/4	1	0	1	1	10 1/4	
2	Carl Schlechter (Austria-Hungary)	0	—N/a	0	3/4	1/2	1	1	3/4	1	1/2	1	1	1	1	9 1/2	
3	Theodor von Scheve (German Empire)	0	1	—N/a	0	1/2	1	1	0	1	1	1	1	1/2	1	9	8
4	Mikhail Chigorin (Russian Empire)	0	1/4	1	—N/a	1/2	0	1	1	3/4	1/2	1	1	1	1	9	7
5	Semyon Alapin (Russian Empire)	1	1/2	1/2	1/2	—N/a	1/2	3/4	1/2	0	1	1	1/2	3/4	1	8 1/2	
6	Jacques Mieses (German Empire)	0	0	0	1	1/2	—N/a	0	1/2	1	1	1	1	0	1	7	
7	Joseph Henry Blackburne (England)	0	0	0	0	1/4	1	—N/a	0	1	1	1/4	1	1	1	6 1/2	6
8	Isidor Gunsberg (England)	0	1/4	1	0	1/2	1/2	1	—N/a	0	3/4	0	1/2	1	1	6 1/2	4
9	Georg Marco (Austria-Hungary)	1/2	0	0	1/4	1	0	0	1	—N/a	1/4	1	1/2	1/2	1	6	
10	Frank Marshall (United States)	1/4	1/2	0	1/2	0	0	0	1/4	3/4	—N/a	1	1	1/4	1	5 1/2	
11	Arturo Reggio (Italy)	0	0	0	0	0	0	3/4	1	0	0	—N/a	1	1	1	4 3/4	
12	James Mason (United States)	1	0	0	0	1/2	0	0	1/2	1/2	0	0	—N/a	1	3/4	4 1/4	
13	Szymon Winawer (Russian Empire)	0	0	1/2	0	1/4	1	0	0	1/2	3/4	0	0	—N/a	1	4	
14	Lucien Didier (France)	0	0	0	0	0	0	0	0	0	0	0	1/4	0	—N/a	1/4	

The tournament used an unusual format, with drawn games being replayed:

- The winner of a replayed game scored 3/4, with the loser receiving 1/4.
- If the replay was also drawn, both players scored 1/2.

== 1902 ==
#	Player	1	2	3	4	5	6	7	8	9	10	11	12	13	14	15	16	17	18	19	20	Total
1	Géza Maróczy (Austria-Hungary)	—N/a	1	1/2	1	0	1/2	1	1/2	1	0	1	3/4	1/2	1	1	1	1	1	1	1	14 3/4
2	Harry Nelson Pillsbury (United States)	0	—N/a	1	1/2	1	1	3/4	1/4	1	3/4	1	1	1	1	1/4	1	1	0	1	1	14 1/2
3	Dawid Janowski (France)	1/2	0	—N/a	1	0	1	1	3/4	1	1	0	1	0	1	1	1	1	3/4	1	1	14
4	Richard Teichmann (German Empire)	0	1/2	0	—N/a	1/2	1	1/2	1	0	1	3/4	1	1/2	3/4	1	1	1	3/4	1	1	13 1/4
5–7	Carl Schlechter (Austria-Hungary)	1	0	1	1/2	—N/a	0	1/2	0	0	1	1	1/2	3/4	1/2	1/2	3/4	1	1	1	1	12
5–7	Siegbert Tarrasch (German Empire)	1/2	0	0	0	1	—N/a	1	0	0	3/4	1/2	1	1	1/2	3/4	1	1	1	1	1	12
5–7	Heinrich Wolf (Austria-Hungary)	0	1/4	0	1/2	1/2	0	—N/a	1	1	3/4	1/4	0	1	1	1	3/4	1	1	1	1	12
8	Mikhail Chigorin (Russian Empire)	1/2	3/4	1/4	0	1	1	0	—N/a	0	1	0	1	1	1	1	0	0	1	1	1	11 1/2
9	Frank Marshall (United States)	0	0	0	1	1	1	0	1	—N/a	0	1	0	1	1/4	0	1	1	3/4	1	1	11
10	Isidor Gunsberg (England)	1	1/4	0	0	0	1/4	1/4	0	1	—N/a	1	1/2	0	1	1	1/2	1	1	1	1	10 3/4
11	William Ewart Napier (United States)	0	0	1	1/4	0	1/2	3/4	1	0	0	—N/a	1	1/2	1/4	1/2	0	1	1	1	1	9 1/2
12	Jacques Mieses (German Empire)	1/4	0	0	0	1/2	0	1	0	1	1/2	0	—N/a	0	1	1	3/4	1	1/4	1	1	9 1/4
13	James Mason (United States)	1/2	0	1	1/2	1/4	0	0	0	0	1	3/4	1	—N/a	0	1/2	1	0	1/2	1	1	9
14	Adolf Albin (Romania)	0	0	0	1/4	1/2	1/2	0	0	3/4	0	3/4	0	1	—N/a	3/4	0	1	1	1	1	8 1/2
15	Georg Marco (Austria-Hungary)	0	3/4	0	0	1/2	1/4	0	0	1	0	1/2	0	1/2	1/4	—N/a	0	1	1	1	1	7 3/4
16	Ignatz von Popiel (Austria-Hungary)	0	0	0	0	1/4	0	1/4	1	0	1/2	1	1/4	0	1	1	—N/a	0	1	0	1	7 1/4
17	Theodor von Scheve (German Empire)	0	0	0	0	0	0	0	1	0	0	0	0	1	0	0	1	—N/a	1/2	1/2	1	5
18	Louis Eisenberg (Russian Empire)	0	1	1/4	1/4	0	0	0	0	1/4	0	0	3/4	1/2	0	0	0	1/2	—N/a	1	0	4 1/2
19	Arturo Reggio (Italy)	0	0	0	0	0	0	0	0	0	0	0	0	0	0	0	1	1/2	0	—N/a	1	2 1/2
20	James Mortimer (England)	0	0	0	0	0	0	0	0	0	0	0	0	0	0	0	0	0	1	0	—N/a	1

The notation and point count is the same as in 1901.

== 1903 ==
#	Player	1	2	3	4	5	6	7	8	9	10	11	12	13	14	Total
1	Siegbert Tarrasch (German Empire)	—N/a	½½	½1	0½	0½	01	11	11	11	11	1½	11	11	11	20.0
2	Géza Maróczy (Austria-Hungary)	½½	—N/a	½½	½½	½½	11	01	11	01	01	11	11	11	11	19.0
3	Harry Nelson Pillsbury (United States)	½0	½½	—N/a	11	11	1½	1½	01	0½	½1	1½	1½	11	11	18.5
4	Carl Schlechter (Austria-Hungary)	1½	½½	00	—N/a	½½	½1	1½	½1	01	½0	1½	11	11	11	17.0
5	Richard Teichmann (German Empire)	1½	½½	00	½½	—N/a	10	½½	1½	½1	10	01	11	11	11	16.5
6	Georg Marco (Austria-Hungary)	10	00	0½	½0	01	—N/a	1½	11	1½	1½	½1	½0	11	11	15.5
7	Heinrich Wolf (Austria-Hungary)	00	10	0½	0½	½½	0½	—N/a	01	1½	11	11	01	01	11	14.0
8	Jacques Mieses (German Empire)	00	00	10	½0	0½	00	10	—N/a	11	11	1½	01	½1	11	13.0
9	Frank Marshall (United States)	00	10	1½	10	½0	0½	0½	00	—N/a	11	01	01	10	11	12.0
10	Jean Taubenhaus (France)	00	10	½0	½1	01	0½	00	00	00	—N/a	½½	11	10	11	10.5
11	James Mason (United States)	0½	00	0½	0½	10	½0	00	0½	10	½½	—N/a	½1	1½	11	10.5
12	Adolf Albin (Romania)	00	00	0½	00	00	½1	10	10	10	00	½0	—N/a	0½	11	8.0
13	Arturo Reggio (Italy)	00	00	00	00	00	00	10	½0	01	01	0½	1½	—N/a	11	7.5
14	Colonel Moreau (France)	00	00	00	00	00	00	00	00	00	00	00	00	00	—N/a	0.0

== 1904 ==
#	Player	1	2	3	4	5	6	Total
1	Géza Maróczy (Austria-Hungary)	—N/a	½½	½1	1½	½1	11	7.5
2	Carl Schlechter (Austria-Hungary)	½½	—N/a	½½	½½	11	11	7.0
3	Frank Marshall (United States)	½0	½½	—N/a	1½	1½	11	6.5
4	Isidor Gunsberg (England)	0½	½½	0½	—N/a	0½	½1	4.0
5	Georg Marco (Austria-Hungary)	½0	00	0½	1½	—N/a	0½	3.0
6	Rudolf Swiderski (German Empire)	00	00	00	½0	1½	—N/a	2.0

== 1904, Rice Gambit tournament ==
Also in 1904, a thematic tournament on the King's Gambit, Rice Gambit was held.

Position: a8 black rook, b8 black knight, c8 black bishop, d8 black queen, e8 black king, h8 black rook, a7 black pawn, b7 black pawn, c7 black pawn, f7 black pawn, h7 black pawn, d6 black bishop, f6 black knight, d5 white pawn, e5 white knight, c4 white bishop, f4 black pawn, g4 black pawn, h4 white pawn, a2 white pawn, b2 white pawn, c2 white pawn, d2 white pawn, g2 white pawn, a1 white rook, b1 white knight, c1 white bishop, d1 white queen, f1 white rook, g1 white king

Rice Gambit after 8. 0-0

#	Player	Swid		Mars		Mies		Marc		vSch		Forg		Total
1	Rudolf Swiderski (German Empire)	—N/a		1	1	0	1	0	1	0	1	0	1	6.0
1	Frank Marshall (United States)	0	0	—N/a		1	1	1	0	0	1	1	1	6.0
3	Jacques Mieses (German Empire)	1	0	0	0	—N/a		½	1	½	1	½	1	5.5
4	Georg Marco (Austria-Hungary)	1	0	0	1	½	0	—N/a		1	0	1	½	5.0
5	Theodor von Scheve (German Empire)	1	0	1	0	½	0	0	1	—N/a		1	0	4.5
6	Leó Forgács (Austria-Hungary)	1	0	0	0	½	0	0	½	0	1	—N/a		3.0

== 1967 ==
#	Player	1	2	3	4	5	6	7	8	9	10	Total
1	Bobby Fischer (United States)	—N/a	½	0	1	½	1	1	1	1	1	7.0
2	Vasily Smyslov (Soviet Union)	½	—N/a	½	½	1	½	½	1	1	1	6.5
3	Efim Geller (Soviet Union)	1	½	—N/a	0	½	½	1	½	1	1	6.0
4	Bent Larsen (Denmark)	0	½	1	—N/a	0	1	1	½	1	1	6.0
5	Aleksandar Matanović (Yugoslavia)	½	0	½	1	—N/a	½	½	½	½	1	5.0
6	Svetozar Gligorić (Yugoslavia)	0	½	½	0	½	—N/a	½	½	1	1	4.5
7	William Lombardy (United States)	0	½	0	0	½	½	—N/a	1	1	1	4.5
8	Győző Forintos (Hungary)	0	0	½	½	½	½	0	—N/a	1	1	4.0
9	Guy Mazzoni (France)	0	0	0	0	½	0	0	0	—N/a	½	1.0
10	Volf Bergraser (France)	0	0	0	0	0	0	0	0	½	—N/a	0.5

== 1968 ==
#	Player	1	2	3	4	5	6	7	8	9	10	11	12	13	14	Total
1	Bent Larsen (Denmark)	—N/a	½	½	½	0	½	1	½	1	1	1	1	1	1	9.5
2	Mikhail Botvinnik (Soviet Union)	½	—N/a	½	½	½	1	½	1	½	½	½	1	1	1	9
3-4	Vlastimil Hort (Czechoslovakia)	½	½	—N/a	½	½	1	½	½	½	½	½	1	1	1	8.5
3-4	Vasily Smyslov (Soviet Union)	½	½	½	—N/a	½	½	½	½	1	½	½	1	1	1	8.5
5	Robert Byrne (United States)	1	½	½	½	—N/a	0	½	½	½	½	1	½	1	1	8
6-8	Lajos Portisch (Hungary)	½	0	0	½	1	—N/a	½	½	½	1	1	1	0	1	7.5
6-8	Florin Gheorghiu (Romania)	0	½	½	½	½	½	—N/a	½	1	½	½	½	1	1	7.5
6-8	Pal Benko (United States)	½	0	½	½	½	½	½	—N/a	½	1	½	½	1	1	7.5
9	Győző Forintos (Hungary)	0	½	½	0	½	½	0	½	—N/a	½	1	½	1	1	6.5
10-11	Mato Damjanović (Yugoslavia)	0	½	½	½	½	0	½	0	½	—N/a	0	½	1	1	5.5
10-11	Wolfgang Uhlmann (East Germany)	0	½	½	½	0	0	½	½	0	1	—N/a	0	1	1	5.5
12	Nikola Padevsky (Bulgaria)	0	0	0	0	½	0	½	½	½	½	1	—N/a	1	½	5
13	Jean-Claude Letzelter (France)	0	0	0	0	0	1	0	0	0	0	0	0	—N/a	½	1.5
14	Sylvain Zinser (France)	0	0	0	0	0	0	0	0	0	0	0	½	½	—N/a	1

== 1969 ==
#	Player	1	2	3	4	5	6	7	8	9	10	11	12	Total
1	Vasily Smyslov (Soviet Union)	—N/a	½	½	½	1	1	½	1	½	1	½	1	8
2	Lajos Portisch (Hungary)	½	—N/a	0	½	1	1	1	½	½	1	1	1	8
3	Vlastimil Hort (Czechoslovakia)	½	1	—N/a	½	½	½	½	½	½	½	1	1	7
4	William Lombardy (United States)	½	½	½	—N/a	½	½	½	½	½	½	1	1	6.5
5	Lothar Schmid (West Germany)	0	0	½	½	—N/a	½	½	1	½	1	1	1	6.5
6	Florin Gheorghiu (Romania)	0	0	½	½	½	—N/a	½	½	1	½	1	1	6
7	Nicolas Rossolimo (United States)	½	0	½	½	½	½	—N/a	0	1	1	½	½	5.5
8	Pal Benko (United States)	0	½	½	½	0	½	1	—N/a	½	0	½	1	5
9	Rudolf Teschner (West Germany)	½	½	½	½	½	0	0	½	—N/a	½	0	1	4.5
10	David Bronstein (Soviet Union)	0	0	½	½	0	½	0	1	½	—N/a	1	½	4.5
11	Karoly Honfi (Hungary)	½	0	0	0	0	0	½	½	1	0	—N/a	0	2.5
12	Predrag Ostojić (Yugoslavia)	0	0	0	0	0	0	½	0	0	½	1	—N/a	2
