= Jeanne D'Autremont =

French chess player

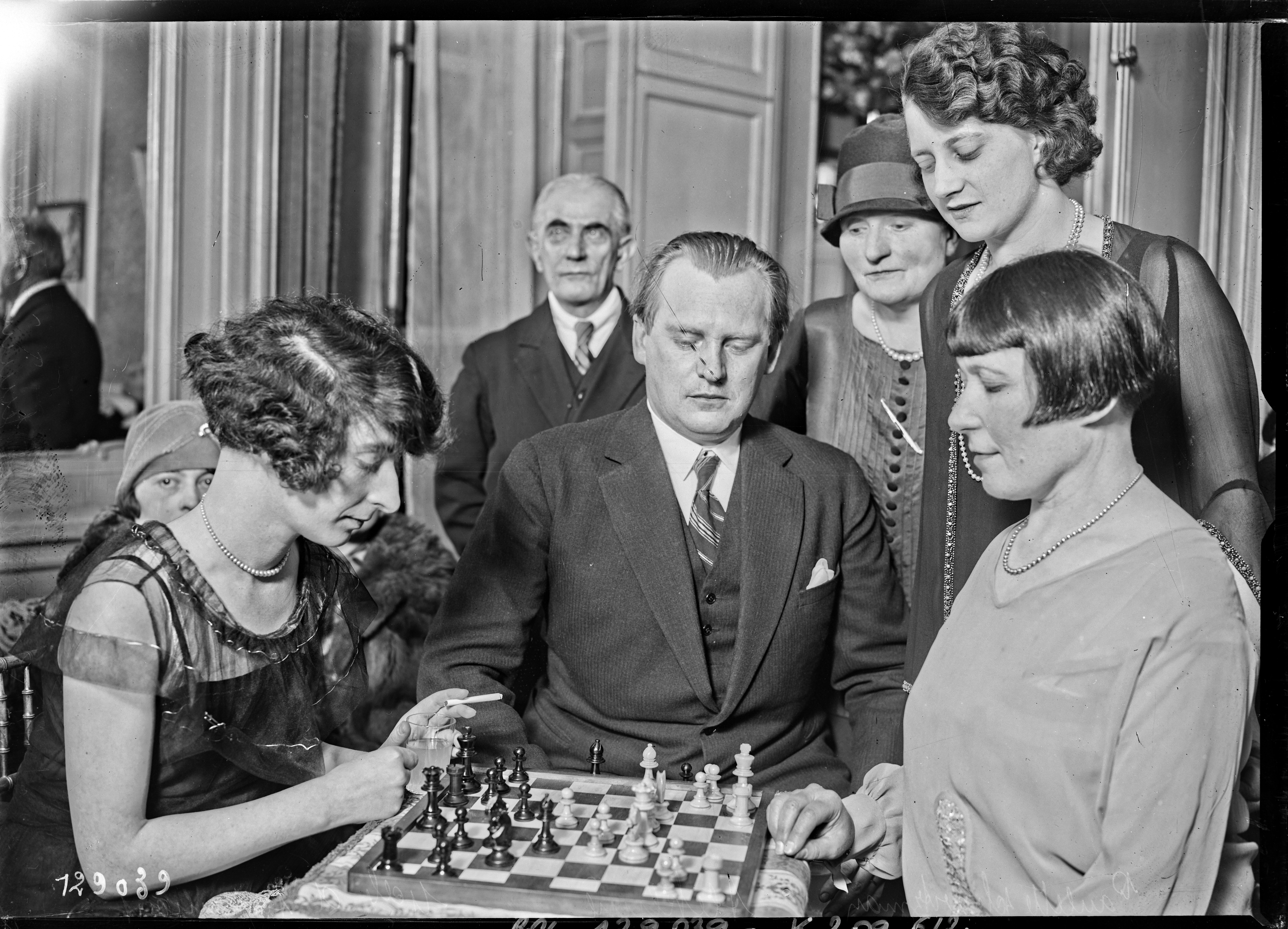

Personal information
- Born: 23 May 1899 Brest, France
- Died: 4 November 1979 (aged 80) Paris, France

Chess career
- Country: France

Jeanne Marie Nancy d'Autremont (23 May 1899 – 4 November 1979), née de Martel, was a French chess player. She was a three-time French Women's Chess Champion (1928, 1929, 1932), and participated in the 1933 Women's World Chess Championship.

== Biography ==
Originally from Brittany nobility, her father was the commander of a warship. In 1926, she married Lucien Bridet d'Autremont and moved to Paris. Three times she won the French Women's Chess Championship, moreover she always took the second place in these tournaments, but became the champion, because the winner did not have French citizenship. In 1928 and 1929 such a chess player turned out to be Paulette Schwartzmann, and in 1932 – Alice Tonini. She also took third place in the French Women's Chess Championship in 1927 and 1933. In 1933 she participated in the Women's World Chess Championship in Folkestone and took 7th place (tournament won by Vera Menchik).
