= Letzelter =

Letzelter is a French surname. Notable people with the surname include:

- Jean-Claude Letzelter (born 1940), French chess master
- Johan Letzelter (born 1984), French footballer
