= Chantal Chaudé de Silans =

French chess player

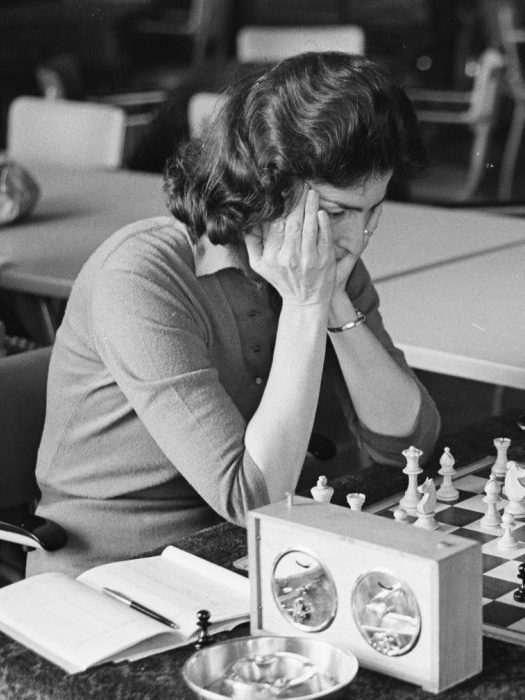
Chantal Chaudé de Silans, 1962

Chantal Chaudé de Silans (9 March 1919, Versailles – 6 September 2001, Grasse) was a French chess player and Woman International Master. She also participated in the Men's/Open competitions.

She learned how to play the game when she was nine along with her brother the Baron de Silans, who later became a strong amateur. In 1932, at age thirteen, she entered her first women's French Chess Championship. In 1936, she won the championship at age seventeen.

In 1939, she married Bernard Chaudé and followed him to Morocco due to World War II. They returned to France in 1942 and soon entered French Resistance nets.

In 1950 she took part to The Gijón International Chess Tournament, she scored 3.5 points.

de Silans represented France at the Women's World Chess Championship in 1949-50. She was leading the field for a good part of the tournament but tired at the end, ending up being tied for fifth place out of sixteen players. Despite having to take care of four children, she participated again in the Candidates Tournaments for the Women's World Championships in 1952 and 1955 (Moscow), and again in 1961 (at Vrnjacka Banja), ending up respectively tied for eighth place, tied for 10th and in 12th place.

She was part of the national French team at the 9th Chess Olympiad held in Dubrovnik in 1950, becoming the first woman ever to participate in this competition.

She was also the first woman to ever take part to the French Chess Championship (men's section). She finished seventh in 1947 and third in 1951, the best result by a woman at the French Championship.

In 1970, shortly after the death of Jeanne Le Bey-Taillis, she became the President of the Paris Caïssa chess club. She voluntarily managed it for more than thirty years; meanwhile, the club produced several young talents who would later become strong grandmasters, such as Olivier Renet, Éloi Relange, Manuel Apicella, Igor-Alexandre Nataf and Joël Lautier.

She was awarded by FIDE the title of Woman International Master, at the creation of the title in 1950 and later the (honorary) title of Woman Grandmaster.

== Illustrative game ==
- "Henri Grob vs Chantal Chaude de Silans". ChessGames.com.
  This game is typical of her attacking style and was played during the match she drew against Henri Grob in Zurich 1951.
