= Sophie Milliet =

French chess player (born 1983)

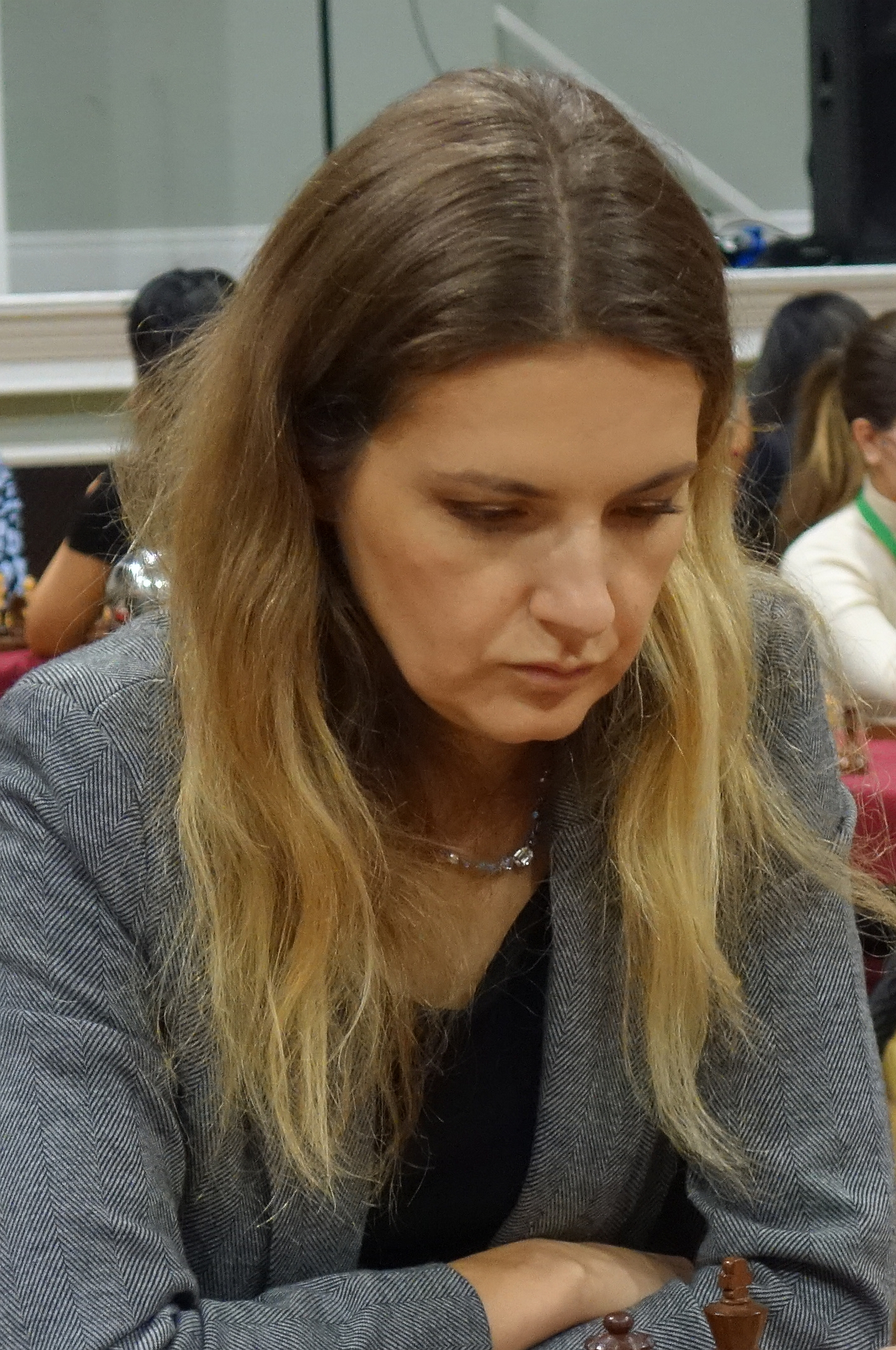
- Milliet in 2023

Personal information
- Born: 2 November 1983 (age 42) Marseille, France

Chess career
- Country: France
- Title: International Master (2009); Woman Grandmaster (2004)
- Peak rating: 2421 (October 2012)

Sophie Milliet (born 2 November 1983 in Marseille) is a French chess player and seven times national women's champion (2003, 2008, 2009, 2011, 2016, 2017 and 2026). She was awarded the International Master title in March 2009, having earned the norms at the French Club Championship (2005), the Swiss Championship at Lenzerheide (2006) and the Béthune Open (2008).

== Chess career ==
Milliet was raised in the French town of Castelnau-le-Lez and learned to play chess at the age of four. Her endeavours at junior level showed good promise and catapulted her Elo rating over the 2100 mark by the time she was seventeen years of age. Consequently, she played top board for the French Girls team at the Faber Cup in Dublin in 2000 and contributed to winning the event.

However, it was at Aix-les-Bains in 2003 that she showed her greatest progress, winning the French Women's Championship with 9/11, an impressive 1½ points clear of the field. The result sealed her qualification for the Woman Grandmaster (WGM) title, awarded the same year. At the 2004 event, she came close to repeating her previous success, for a while leading the competition in Val d'Isère and eventually taking second place behind Almira Skripchenko. Due to the strength of this contest, she gained many rating points.

In 2006, she made a foray to the Swiss Open Championship in Lenzerheide and placed a creditable third. Competing at the Baku 2007 Women's International she faced a tough test, losing her first 3 games, then resourcefully climbing back to 4/9 in what was a first class line-up. Pia Cramling was just one notable scalp along the way.

The French championship returned to Aix-les-Bains in 2007 and once again she finished in first place, this time on equal points with Silvia Collas. A rapidplay play-off was used to determine the champion and Milliet narrowly missed out. At Pau in 2008, she claimed a second triumph in the French Women's Championship. At Nîmes in 2009 she won her third title with the score of 7/10 (+5 −1 =4).

In October 2015, Milliet became the Mediterranean Women's Champion in Beirut.

At Agen in 2016 and 2017, she again won the French Women's national championship, the latter being in convincing fashion, after finishing 2.5 points above runner-up Cecile Haussernot. In 2026, she won the French Women's Championship for seventh time at Vichy.

A keen exponent of team chess, she represented France in the Chess Olympiads of 2004 and 2006, notching up a healthy, cumulative plus score of +11 −4 =6. She also participated at the European Team Chess Championships of 2003, 2005 and 2007. As a player of league chess, she is extremely active and has participated in the French Nationale for three teams; Bischwiller, Clichy and latterly, Montpellier. Between 2003 and 2005 she was a frequent visitor to the German Women's Bundesliga and in respect of the UK's 4NCL, has occasionally appeared for the largely female-populated Pride and Prejudice team in 2007/08.
