= Silvia Collas =

Bulgarian-French chess player (born 1974)

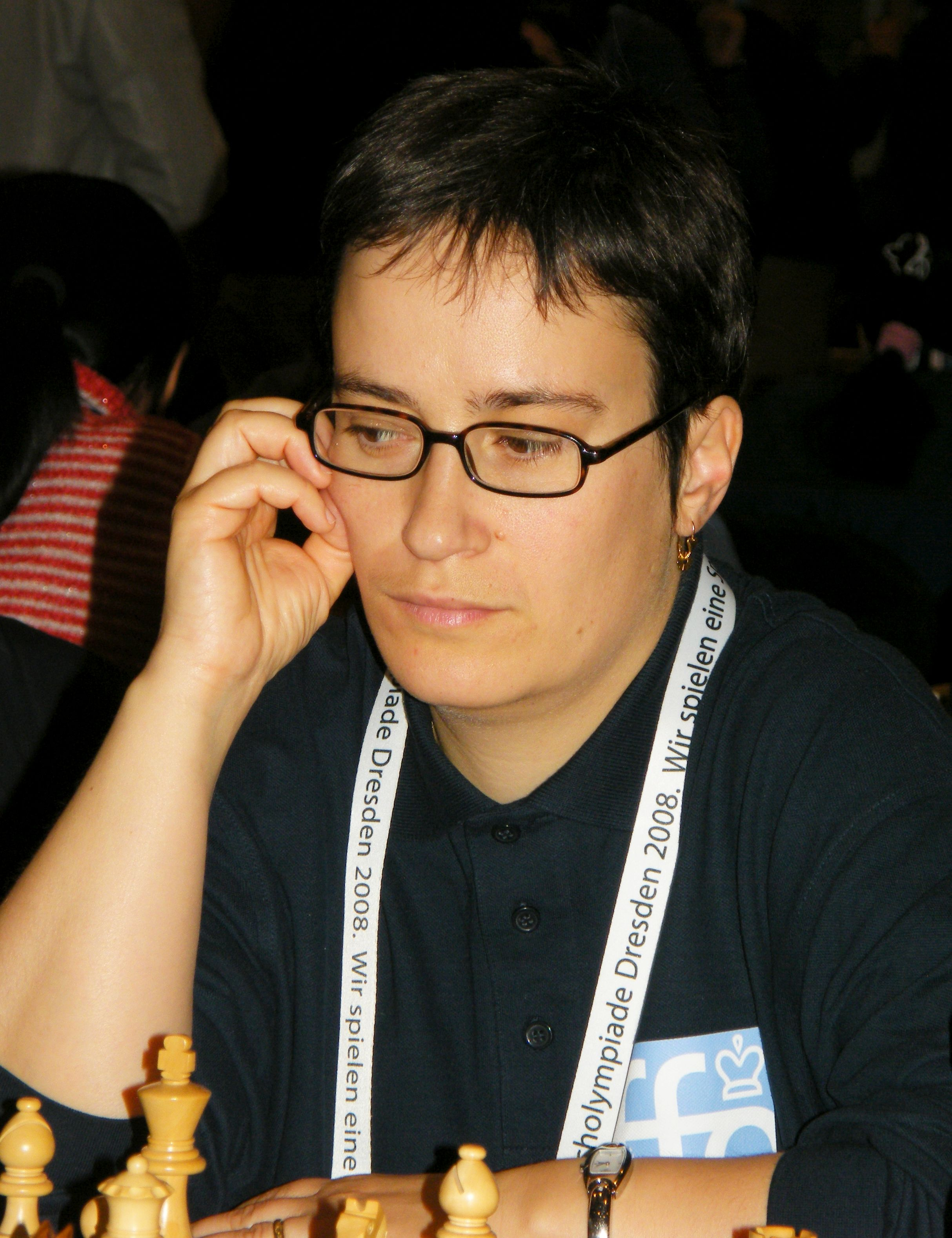
- Silvia Collas in 2008

Personal information
- Born: 4 May 1974 (age 52) Sofia, Bulgaria

Chess career
- Country: Bulgaria (until 2002); France (since 2002)
- Title: International Master (2003); Woman Grandmaster (1998)
- Peak rating: 2408 (October 2007)

Silvia Collas (née Aleksieva; born 4 May 1974) is a Bulgarian-French chess player who holds the titles of International Master (IM) and Woman Grandmaster (WGM).

== Career ==
She won the European Girls U20 Championship in 1994. Collas played for Bulgaria in the Women's Chess Olympiad in 1994, 1996, 1998, 2000, and 2002. In December 2002, she transferred to the French Chess Federation, and has since represented France. In 2003, she won the Mediterranean women's championship in Beirut. In 2007, Collas became the French women's champion after winning a rapidplay playoff with Sophie Milliet. She has played for the French team at the Women's Chess Olympiad since 2004. In the 2012 event, Collas won an individual silver medal thanks to her rating performance of 2469 on board 4.
