= Milinka Merlini =

French chess player

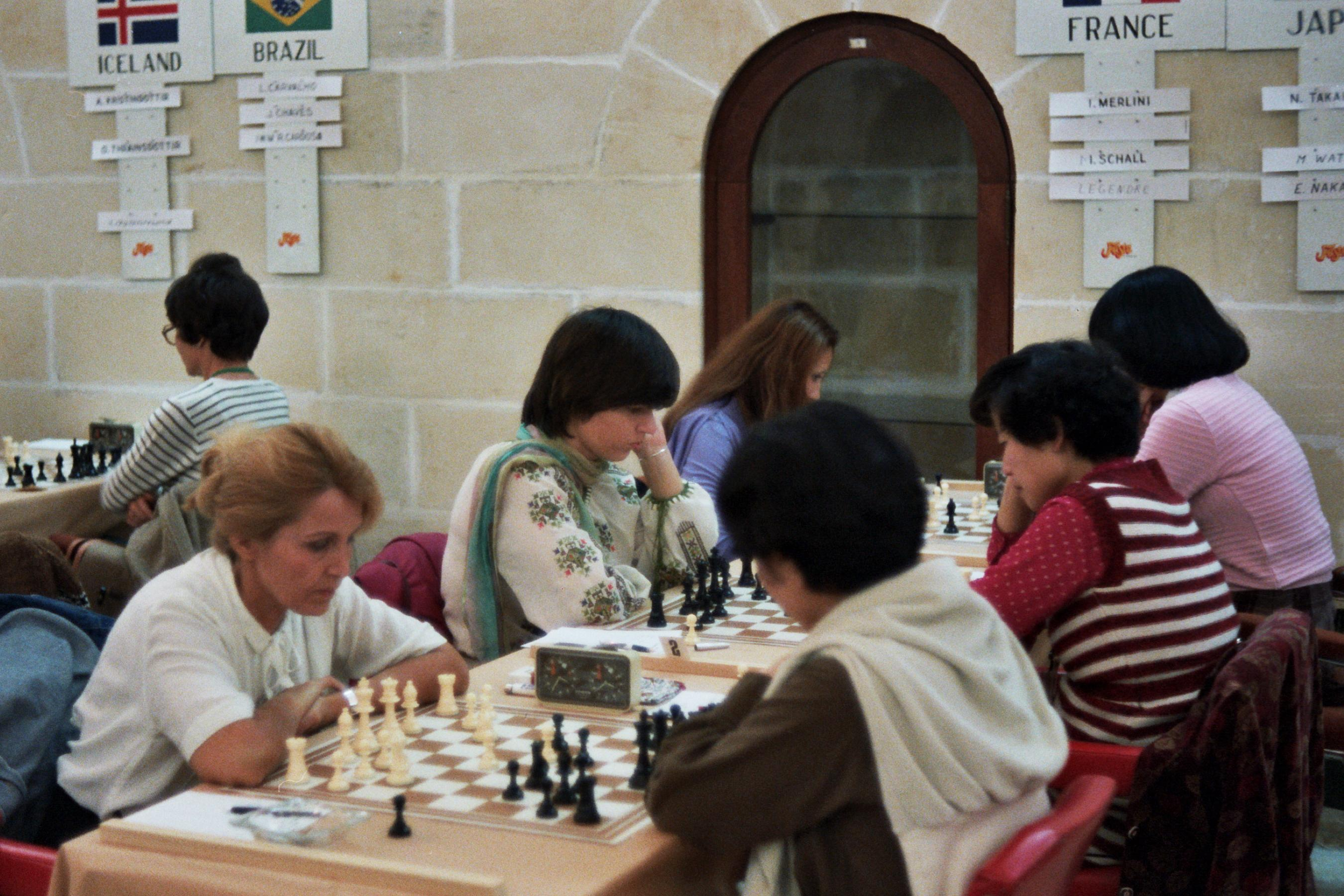
- Milinka Merlini (left) in Chess Olympiad (1980)

Personal information
- Born: 24 October 1929 Tučkovo, Yugoslavia
- Died: 29 October 1996 (aged 67) Paris, France

Chess career
- Country: Yugoslavia (before 1972); France (after 1972)

Milinka Merlini (née Ćirović; 24 October 1929 – 29 October 1996) was a Yugoslav–French chess player, five-time French Women's Chess Championship winner (1975, 1976, 1977, 1978, 1980).

== Biography ==
Milinka Merlini lived in Yugoslavia until 1961 before emigrating to France, but she remained eligible to play for the Yugoslav Chess Federation until 1972. She worked as a Russian teacher and translated several works into French.

In 1960, Milinka Merlini won both the Belgrade and Serbian Women's Chess Championships. After moving to France, she won French Women's Chess Championship five times (1975 to 1978 and 1980), and played a key role in its reintroduction after a long break (French Women's Chess Championship was not held between 1958 and 1974). In 1973, in Wijk aan Zee Milinka Merlini participated in Women's World Chess Championship Zonal tournament.

Milinka Merlini played for France in the Women's Chess Olympiads:

- In 1976, at first board in the 7th Chess Olympiad (women) in Haifa (+5, =3, -4),
- In 1978, at first board in the 8th Chess Olympiad (women) in Buenos Aires (+3, =2, -7),
- In 1980, at first board in the 9th Chess Olympiad (women) in Valletta (+5, =2, -5),
- In 1986, at first reserve board in the 27th Chess Olympiad (women) in Dubai (+4, =0, -4).

In the 1980s, Merlini helped introduce chess into French classrooms as part of the Point bleu Échecs programme, notably at Cours Molière, where she worked with Jean Uzan, former vice-president of the Fédération française des échecs.
