= Marie Jeanne Frigard =

French chess player

Personal information
- Born: 30 October 1904 Grimaud, France
- Died: 29 July 1971 Ivry-sur-Seine, France

Chess career
- Country: France

Marie Jeanne Stein (née Frigard; 30 October 1904, Grimaud – 29 July 1971, Ivry-sur-Seine) was a French chess player and classical violinist. She was a four-time French Women's Chess Champion (1924, 1925, 1926, 1927). She was a participant in the first Women's World Chess Championship in 1927.

== Biography ==
In 1924, Frigard won the first French Women's Chess Championship in Paris after a playoff. She repeated this success three times from 1925 to 1927. In 1925 and 1927 she finished in second place but was nevertheless crowned the French women's champion, because the Paulette Schwartzmann, the winner of both tournaments, did not have French citizenship. In 1924, she finished second out of three players in a women's amateur chess tournament in Westende. In 1927 she participated in the first Women's World Chess Championship in London won by Vera Menchik, where she shared 9th–11th places. After 1927 she rarely participated in chess tournaments.

Marie Jeanne Frigard played violin from the age of seven. In 1920s and 1930s she was a famous classical violinist. In 1928, she was the first violin of the Saint-Denis Orchestra took part in guest performances in Canada.

During the occupation of France, Frigard lived in Nice, where she was deported in 1943 or 1944. From 15 September 1944 to 23 March 1945, she worked at a Nazi labor camp in Dresden making radios.
