= Bachar Kouatly =

French chess grandmaster (born 1958)

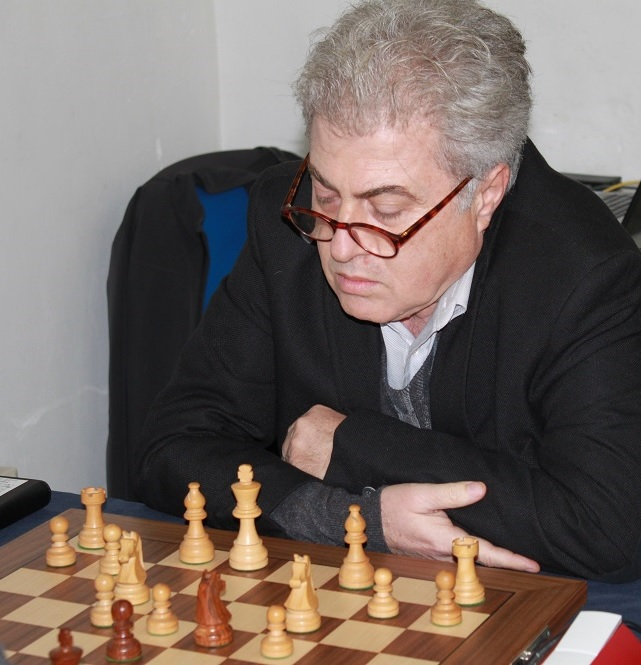
- Bachar Kouatly in 2016

Personal information
- Born: 3 March 1958 (age 68) Damascus, Syria

Chess career
- Country: Lebanon (until 1983); France (since 1983)
- Title: Grandmaster (1989)
- FIDE rating: 2453 (October 2026)
- Peak rating: 2520 (July 1993)

Bachar Kouatly (Arabic: بشار قواتلي; born 3 March 1958 in Damascus) is a Syrian-French chess grandmaster, journalist and activist. He was a deputy president of FIDE.

== Early life ==
Kouatly was born on 3 March 1958 in Damascus, Syria to a Syrian father and a French mother. Soon after the Six-Day war between the Arab countries and Israel, when he was 9 years old, he went over to France (his mother's homeland) and then to Lebanon he started chess in Schools team competition in Lebanon in 1973. He played three times for Lebanon in the World Junior Chess Championship (1975–1977), and represented Lebanon at the Chess Olympiad at La Valletta 1980. He won a zonal tournament at Qatar in 1981 and finished 14th at the 1982 Interzonal tournament in Toluca.

Kouatly won the French Chess Championship in 1979. He played for France in five Chess Olympiads (1982, 1984, 1986, 1988, and 1992).

He was awarded the titles of International Master in 1975 and Grandmaster in 1989.

Bachar Kouatly is an editor of Europe Échecs, a French–language chess magazine.

On December 10, 2016, he was elected President of the French Chess Federation. In 2018, he was elected the deputy president of the International Chess Federation.

== Career ==
Bachar Kouatly initially played for Lebanon, became an International Master in 1975, and then emigrated to France.

He was the French Chess Championship in 1979, runner-up in 1984, and third in 1991.

He became an International Grandmaster (chess) in 1989 (he was the first Frenchman to earn that title since the 1960s).

He has played much less since the late 1980s, devoting more of his time to organizing chess events. In particular, he ran for president of the FIDE in 1994 and 1996.

He has been the editor-in-chief of the chess magazine Europe Échecs since 1997.

After resuming his playing career between 2004 and 2008, he was inactive from 2008 to 2015, but has been playing sporadically since 2015. As of April 1, 2016, his Elo rating is 2,450.

On December 10, 2016, Bachar Kouatly became president of the French Chess Federation after the “Ambitions FFE” slate he led won 62.29% of the vote in the Executive Committee election.

On October 5, 2018, he became vice president of the International Chess Federation following Arkady Dvorkovich election as president of the organization.

Having remained in a conflict of interest since his election, he is suspected of having, in 2018, diverted one or more public grants intended for the FFE to a commercial entity he owns, notably from the city of Agen. This commercial entity is also the publisher of the magazine Europe Échecs. The May 2019 issue of the magazine reports a change in leadership. The president and editor-in-chief is now Sami Kouatly, Bachar’s son.

A General assembly of the FFÉ was held on December 5, 2020. The assembly rejected the motion to extend the executive committee’s term until the general assembly on April 3, 2021. Bachar Kouatly resigned as president on December 9. Yves Marek, who had served as vice president since November 28, 2020, was appointed interim president of the FFÉ until the general assembly in April 2021.

Kouatly ran again in the FFÉ presidential election on April 3, 2021, but was defeated by Éloi Relange, who received 632 votes to Kouatly's 561.
