= Claude Hugot =

French chess player

Personal information
- Born: 16 February 1929 Villiers-sur-Marne, France
- Died: 7 October 1978 (aged 59) Neuilly-sur-Seine, France

Chess career
- Country: France

Claude Léon André Hugot (pronounced [klod yɡo]; 16 February 1929 – 7 October 1978) was a French chess player, French Chess Championship winner (1949).

== Biography ==
In the late 1940s – early 1950s Claude Hugot was one of the leading chess players in France. He won three medals in French Chess Championships: gold (1949) and two silver (1950, 1953 – in the latter on additional indicators lost the championship Savielly Tartakower) medals. In 1949, Claude Hugot was the winner of the French Chess Team Championship with the Paris chess club Caissa. He was a participant in a number of international chess tournaments, including the Hoogovens tournament in Beverwijk.

Claude Hugot played for France in the Chess Olympiad:

- In 1950, at third board in the 9th Chess Olympiad in Dubrovnik (+4, =5, -4).

Claude Hugot played for France in the European Team Chess Championship preliminaries:

- In 1957, at fifth board in the 1st European Team Chess Championship preliminaries (+0, =2, -0).

In 1959, he completed his chess career due to a conflict with the leadership of the French Chess Federation during the French Chess Championship final tournament.
