= Gilles Mirallès =

French chess grandmaster (1966–2022)

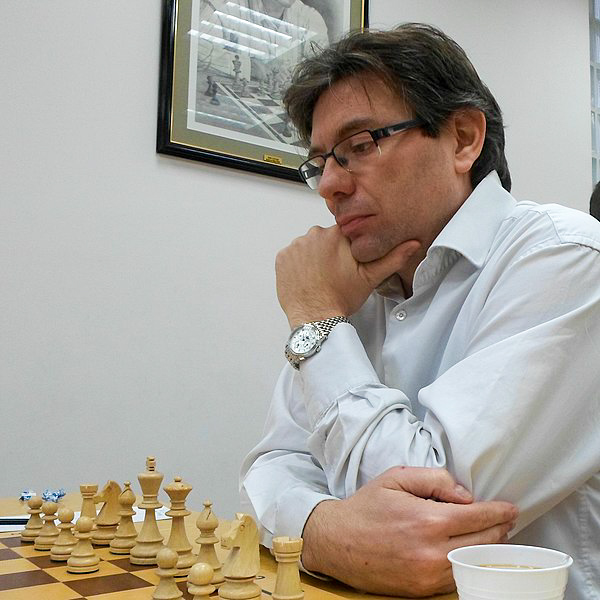
- Mirallès in 2014

Personal information
- Born: 8 February 1966 Grasse, France
- Died: 28 January 2022 (aged 55) Ferney-Voltaire, France

Chess career
- Country: France
- Title: Grandmaster (1997)
- Peak rating: 2520 (January 1998)

Gilles Mirallès (8 February 1966 – 28 January 2022) was a French chess grandmaster.

== Biography ==
Mirallès became a Grandmaster in 1997 after winning the French Junior Chess Championship in 1982 and the French Chess Championship in 1986 and 1989. He came in third place in 1990. Also a chess coach, he was directeur technique national of the French Chess Federation from 1992 to 1996. He also collaborated with the magazine Échec et Mat.

He moved to Geneva and became President of the Fédération genevoise d'échecs and director of the École d'échecs de Genève. On 1 January 2011, he was ranked 43rd in France with an Elo rating of 2462.

Mirallès died in Ferney-Voltaire on 28 January 2022, at the age of 55.
