= Claude Lemoine =

French chess player

Personal information
- Born: 21 April 1932 (age 94)

Chess career
- Country: France

Claude Lemoine (born 21 April 1932), is a French chess player and journalist, French Chess Championship winner (1958).

== Biography ==
In 1950s Claude Lemoine was one of the leading French chess players. He took part in the individual French Chess Championship finals many times and won four medals: gold (1958), two silver (1956, 1959) and bronze (1957).

Claude Lemoine played for France in the Chess Olympiad:

- In 1958, at fourth board in the 13th Chess Olympiad in Munich (+5, =4, -5).

Claude Lemoine played for France in the World Student Team Chess Championship:

- In 1959, at first board in the 6th World Student Team Chess Championship in Budapest (+2, =10, -1).

Claude Lemoine played for France in the Clare Benedict Cup:

- In 1957, at fourth board in the 4th Clare Benedict Chess Cup in Bern (+1, =2, -2).

In the early 1960s Claude Lemoine moved away from the practical chess game and made a career as a journalist. He conducted chess departments at radio stations, as well as in the newspaper Le Monde. Later Claude Lemoine switched to television. He was the general director of one of the regional branches of the France 3 TV channel.
