= André Chéron =

André Chéron may refer to:

- André Chéron (chess player) (1895–1980), French chess player, theorist, and composer
- André Cheron (actor) (1880–1952), French-born American character actor
