= Mary Gilchrist =

Scottish chess player (1882–1947)

- Born: 4 June 1882; Rutherglen, Scotland
- Died: 14 January 1947 (aged 64); Edinburgh, Scotland
- Known for: Chess

Mary Dinorah Gilchrist (4 June 1882 – 14 January 1947) was a Scottish chess player.

Gilchrist was born in Rutherglen to Mary Cameron and John Gilchrist, an ostrich-feather merchant and chess player.

She began playing chess at the Glasgow Ladies Chess Club and later moved to Edinburgh where she joined the Edinburgh Ladies Chess Club, at which she became a leading player. She was the Scottish Ladies Champion multiple times, in 1921, 1922, 1923 and 1938. She won twice British Chess Championship in 1929 and 1934. She represented Scotland at the Women's World Chess Championship in the 4th Women's World Chess Championship at Folkestone in 1933, where she placed third, and again at the 6th Women's World Chess Championship at Stockholm in 1937 where she placed joint 8-9th, both events were won by Vera Menchik.

Upon the merger of the Scottish Ladies Chess Association with the men's Scottish Chess Association (SCA), Gilchrist was one of four women to become president of the SCA. She served from November 1937 to April 1938. Gilchrist was a life member of the British Chess Federation.

Gilchrist died on 14 January 1947 in Edinburgh. Very little is known of her life outside of chess, although on her death certificate she is described as a confectioner.
