= André Thiellement =

French chess player

Personal information
- Born: 6 May 1906 Paris, France
- Died: 20 February 1976 (aged 69) Paris, France

Chess career
- Country: France

André Thiellement (6 May 1906 – 20 February 1976), was a French chess master, two times French Chess Championship winner (1962, 1963) and Chief Administrator of the Overseas Territories.

== Biography ==
André Thiellement learned to play chess at the age of 17. From the 1930s to the 1960s he was one of the leading French chess players. In French Chess Championship André Thiellement won seven medals: 2 gold (1962, 1963), 2 silver (1931, 1952) and 3 bronze (1951, 1955, 1964). In 1952, he won French Team Chess Championship with the team of the Parisian club Caissa. In 1968, André Thiellement won silver medal in Paris Chess Championship.

André Thiellement played for France in the Chess Olympiads:

- In 1954, at third board in the 11th Chess Olympiad in Amsterdam (+2, =2, -5),
- In 1962, at third board in the 15th Chess Olympiad in Varna (+8, =3, -5),
- In 1964, at third board in the 16th Chess Olympiad in Tel Aviv (+3, =5, -4),
- In 1968, at first reserve board in the 18th Chess Olympiad in Lugano (+3, =5, -1).

André Thiellement played for France in the Clare Benedict Chess Cups:

- In 1953, at third board in the 1st Clare Benedict Chess Cu in Mont Pèlerin (+1, =2, -2).

André Thiellement was in the civil service. After graduating from École nationale de la France d'Outre-Mer he worked in administrative positions in French colonies. The pinnacle of his career is the position of Prefect Madagascar.
