= Guy Mazzoni =

French chess player

Personal information
- Born: 29 August 1929 Tunis, Tunisia
- Died: 25 October 2002 (aged 73) Montreuil, France

Chess career
- Country: France

Guy Mazzoni (29 August 1929 – 25 October 2002), was a French physician and chess player, two-times French Chess Championship winner (1961, 1965).

== Biography ==
In the 1950s and 1960s Guy Mazzoni was one of the best French chess players. In 1958 he won Paris City Chess Championship. Guy Mazzoni has played in individual French Chess Championship finals many times and won 6 medals: 2 gold (1961, 1965) and 4 silver (1954, 1963, 1964, 1969). In 1963 in Enschede he first time participated in World Chess Championship Zonal tournament and shared 13th–14th place. In 1966 in The Hague he second time participated in World Chess Championship Zonal tournament and shared 14th–15th place. In 1967, Guy Mazzoni finished 9th in Monte Carlo chess tournament that included some of the world's top players.

Guy Mazzoni played for France in the Chess Olympiads:

- In 1964, at second board in the 16th Chess Olympiad in Tel Aviv (+7, =6, -3),
- In 1966, at first board in the 17th Chess Olympiad in Havana (+2, =5, -6).
