= Gilles Andruet =

French chess player

Personal information
- Born: 30 March 1958 Versailles, France
- Died: 22 August 1995 (aged 37) Saulx-les-Chartreux, France

Chess career
- Country: France
- Title: International Master (1982)
- Peak rating: 2450 (July 1988)

Gilles Andruet (30 March 1958 – 22 August 1995) was a French chess player, an International Master and a former national champion. He was the son of rally driver Jean-Claude Andruet.

== Chess career ==
Andruet was a member of the French team at the 1982, 1984 and 1988 Chess Olympiad. In 1988 he won the French Chess Championship and reached his peak Elo rating (2450). During the 1989 Championship, Andruet was involved in a violent altercation with Jean-Luc Seret and subsequently withdrew from the tournament despite the fact that he was in the lead after 10 of 14 rounds. He played less regularly after 1991.

== Murder and subsequent trial ==
Andruet was also a gambler. Starting in 1993, he regularly played backgammon and blackjack in casinos and although he initially won significant amounts of money, he eventually became a pathological gambler riddled with debt. On 22 August 1995 Andruet's body was found on the shores of the Yvette in Saulx-les-Chartreux. He had been beaten to death. The investigation focused on Joseph Liany and his son Franck who had presumably helped Andruet cash a check of 398,000 French francs. Joseph Liany was eventually tried eight years later, convicted of murder and sentenced to a 15-year prison term. His son Franck received a seven-year sentence for his role in the affair. Joseph Liany subsequently identified his nephew Sacha Rhoul as the man solely responsible for the murder. A new trial in 2006 cleared Liany but convicted Rhoul in absentia. Rhoul had been living in Marrakesh where he and his father managed the Palais Rhoul, a well-known luxury hotel. Jean-Claude Andruet, Gilles' father repeatedly called for the arrest and extradition of Rhoul. On 25 February 2010, Moroccan authorities arrested Rhoul following an Interpol mandate and extradited him on 6 March. Four years later, Sacha Rhoul was acquitted.
