= Arnold Aurbach =

Polish-French chess player

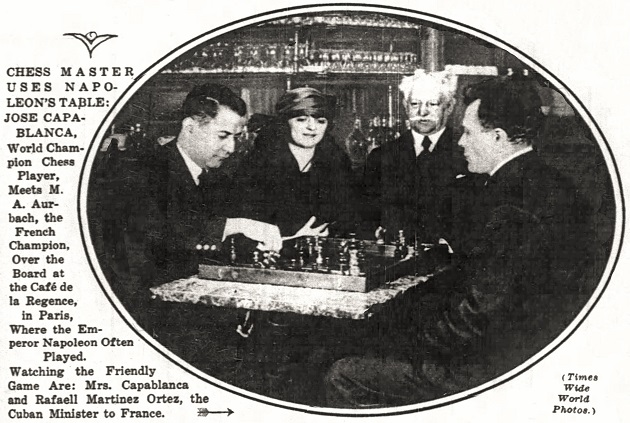
José Raúl Capablanca meets Arnold Aurbach in the Café de la Régence. Watchin the game is Mrs. Capablanca and Rafaell Martinez Ortez, the Cuban minister to France (1922).

Arnold Aurbach (c. 1888, in Warsaw – 31 December 1952) was a Polish–French chess master.

At the beginning of the 20th century, he left Warsaw for Paris. He won a match against Adolphe Silbert (3 : 1) at Paris (La Régence) 1907; won, ahead of Weinstein, at Paris 1909; took 12th at Abbazia 1912 (Rudolf Spielmann won); drew a mini match with José Raúl Capablanca (1 : 1) in 1913, and lost a match to him (0 : 2) in 1914, both in Paris.

In 1917, he won, ahead of Silbert, in Paris. After World War I, he lost a mini match to Alexander Alekhine (0.5 : 1.5) at Paris 1922; and took 2nd, behind Alekhine, at Berne 1925 (Quadrangular).

== See also ==
- List of Jewish chess players
