= Glenn Flear =

English chess grandmaster and author (born 1959)

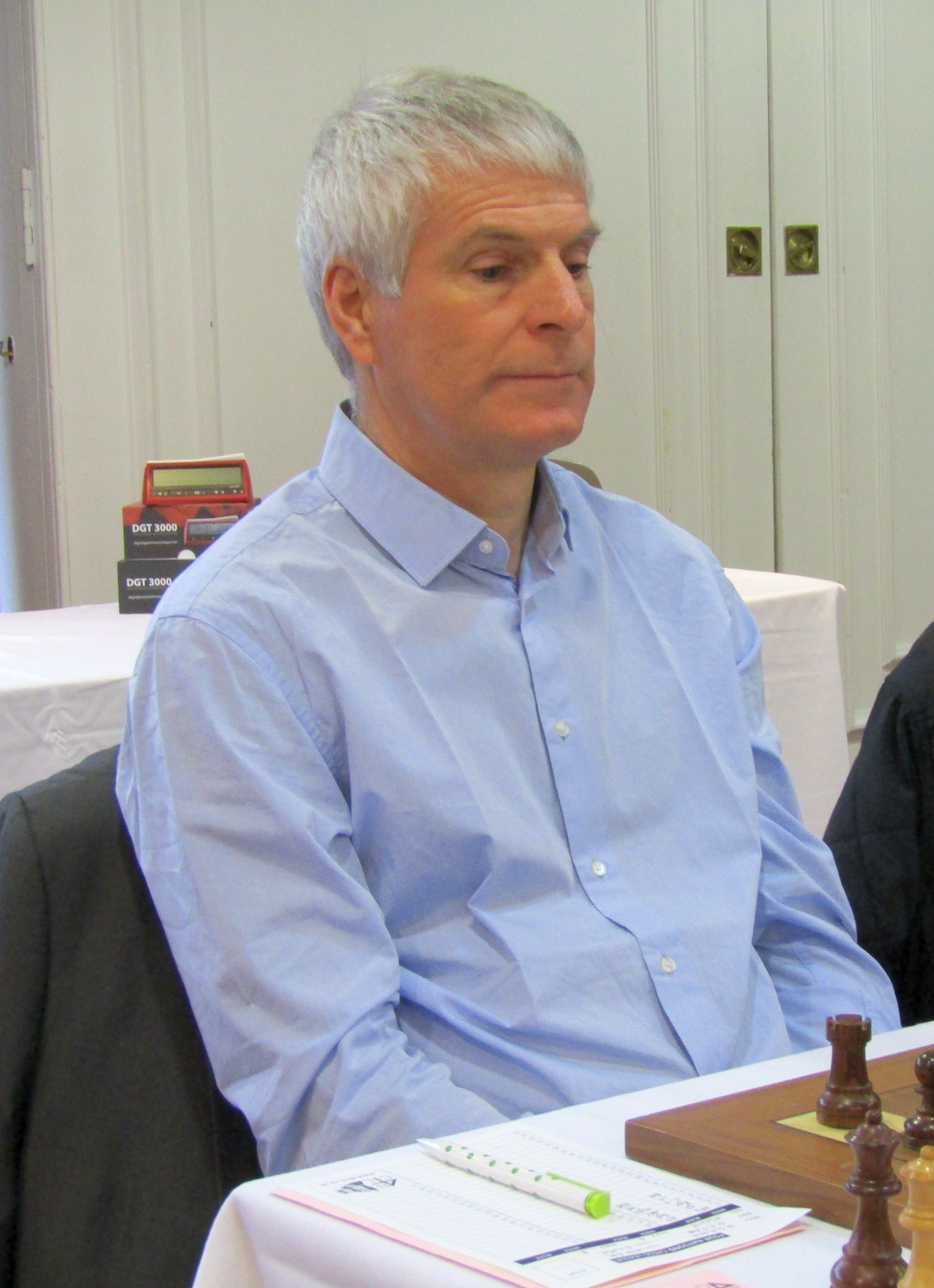
- Flear in 2017

Personal information
- Born: Glenn Curtis Flear; 12 February 1959 (age 67) Leicester, England
- Spouse: Christine Leroy (m. 1986)

Chess career
- Country: England
- Title: Grandmaster (1987)
- Peak rating: 2555 (July 1999)
- Peak ranking: No. 94 (July 1986)

Glenn Curtis Flear (born 12 February 1959) is an English chess grandmaster. He is the author of several books, some on chess openings and some on the endgame.

He was awarded the International Master title in 1983 and Grandmaster title in 1987.

Flear created one of the greatest-ever chess tournament upsets when, as a last minute substitute, he won the London 1986 event (ahead of Chandler, Short, Nunn, Ribli, Polugaevsky, Portisch, Spassky, Vaganian, Speelman, and Larsen, amongst others). To round off the occasion, he married five-time French Women's Champion Christine Leroy during the event. They have two sons, James and Nathan.

He also represented England at the 1986 Dubai Olympiad (earning a team silver medal) and at the European Team Chess Championship at Plovdiv in 2003.

He lives in Montpellier, France.

== Selected writings ==
- Improve Your Endgame Play, 2000, Everyman Chess. ISBN 1-85744-246-6.
- Open Ruy Lopez, 2000, Everyman Chess. ISBN 978-1857442618.
- Mastering the Endgame, 2001, Everyman Chess. ISBN 1-85744-233-4.
- Test Your Endgame Thinking, 2002, Everyman Chess. ISBN 1-85744-305-5.
- The ...a6 Slav: The Tricky and Dynamic Lines with...a6. 2005, Everyman Chess. ISBN 1857443209.
- Starting Out: Pawn Endings, 2004, Everyman Chess. ISBN 1-85744-362-4.
- Starting Out: Slav & Semi-Slav, 2005, Everyman Chess. ISBN 1857443934.
- Practical Endgame Play – Beyond the Basics: the Definitive Guide to the Endgames that Really Matter, 2007, Everyman Chess. ISBN 978-1-85744-555-8
- Starting Out: Open Games, 2010, Everyman Chess. ISBN 1857446305.
- Tactimania: Find the Winning Combination, 2011, Quality Chess. ISBN 1-90655-298-3.
