= Nicolas Giffard =

French chess player

Personal information
- Born: 4 October 1950 (age 75) La Baule-Escoublac, France

Chess career
- Country: France
- Title: International Master (IM) (1980)

Nicolas Giffard (born 4 October 1950) is a French chess International Master (IM) (1980), and a two-time French Chess Championship winner (1978, 1982).

== Biography ==
In the 1970s and 1980s Nicolas Giffard was one of the leading French chess players. He twice winning gold medal in French Chess Championship: in 1978 in Castelnaudary and in 1982 in Schiltigheim. Also Nicolas Giffard twice won silver medal in this championships: : in 1974 in Chambéry and in 1976 in Saint-Jean-de-Monts. In 1980, he was awarded the FIDE International Master (IM) title. Nicolas Giffard has successfully participated in international chess tournaments where he has won 2nd place in OPEN INTERNACIONAL D’ANDORRA (1985). In 1980, he shared 1st place with Israel Zilber in Paris City Chess Championship.

Nicolas Giffard played for France in the Chess Olympiads:

- In 1978, at second board in the 23rd Chess Olympiad in Buenos Aires (+5, =2, -3),
- In 1980, at second board in the 24th Chess Olympiad in La Valletta (+5, =6, -2),
- In 1982, at third board in the 25th Chess Olympiad in Lucerne (+3, =4, -4).

Nicolas Giffard played for France in the European Team Chess Championship preliminaries:

- In 1977, at seventh board in the 6th European Team Chess Championship preliminaries (+0, =2, -4),
- In 1983, at fourth board in the 8th European Team Chess Championship preliminaries (+0, =1, -2).

Nicolas Giffard played for France in the World Student Team Chess Championship:

- In 1974, at fourth board in the 20th World Student Team Chess Championship in Teesside (+6, =5, -1).

Nicolas Giffard has written several books on chess:

- La Fabuleuse Histoire des champions d'échecs, ODIL, 1978
- Huit candidats, quatre KO, L'Impensé radical, 1977
- Les Échecs, leçons particulières avec un champion, Le Livre de poche, Paris, 1997, ISBN 978-2253081517
- Les Échecs, la tactique moderne, Éditions du Rocher, Monaco, 1997, ISBN 978-2268009438
- L'Efficacité aux échecs, Bornemann, 1998, ISBN 978-2851825865
- Comprendre les ouvertures, Bornemann, 1999, ISBN 978-2851825940
- With Alain Biénabe: Le Nouveau Guide des échecs : Traité complet, Éditions Robert Laffont, Paris, 2009, ISBN 978-2221110133
