= Christine Flear =

French chess player (born 1967)

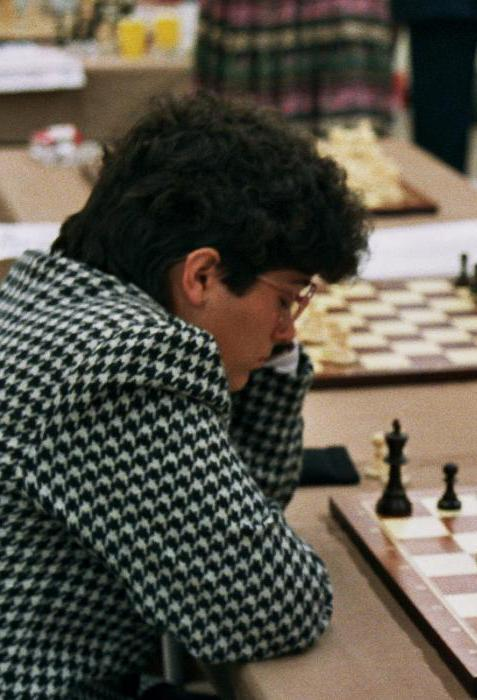

Personal information
- Born: 22 April 1967 (age 59)
- Spouse: Glenn Flear (m. 1986)

Chess career
- Country: France
- Title: Woman International Master (1987)
- Peak rating: 2267 (October 2000)

Christine Flear (née Leroy; born 22 April 1967) is a French chess player.

== Chess career ==
She has won the women's section of the French Chess Championship five times (in 1985, 1991, 1994, 1998 and 1999) and finished runner-up three times (1996, 1997 and 2002).

She participated in the 1998 Chess Olympiad and the 2000 Chess Olympiad.

== Personal life ==
In 1986, she married Glenn Flear, an English Grandmaster. They live in France near Montpellier and have two sons.
