= Edward Chamier =

French chess player

Edward Chamier (3 September 1840, Weymouth – 12 August 1892, Paris) was a French chess master.

He was born into an English branch of a French Huguenot family (his ancestors emigrated from France to England and Prussia). Chamier won at Paris 1874 (Café de la Régence) and at Paris 1881 (the second French National Tournament, unofficial French Chess Championship). He played in a correspondence match Paris vs. Vienna in 1884.
