= Andreea Bollengier =

Romanian-French chess player (1975–2021)

Personal information
- Full name: Andreea-Teodora Sasu-Ducșoara
- Born: 17 May 1975 Brașov, Romania
- Died: 28 May 2021 (aged 46) Talence, France

Chess career
- Country: Romania (until 2010); France (after 2010)
- Title: Woman International Master (2000)
- Peak rating: 2291 (September 2014)

Andreea Bollengier (née Sasu-Ducșoara; 17 May 1975 – 28 May 2021) was a Romanian-born French chess player who held the FIDE title of Woman International Master (WIM) since 2000. She was a two-time French Women's Chess Championship medalist (2011, 2014).

== Biography ==
At the age of 5, Andreea started playing chess with her father Adrian Sasu-Ducșoara, an FIDE Master. Later, she won a Romanian Youth Chess Championship in the U16 girl's age group.

In 2000, she played for Romania in the Women's Chess Olympiad, at first reserve board in the 34th Chess Olympiad (women) in Istanbul (+3, =2, −1).

Bollengier won the French Women's Chess Championship Accession féminine tournament in 2010. She twice won medals in French Women's Chess Championship: silver in 2014 and bronze in 2011.

In 2012, she played for France in the Women's Chess Olympiad, at fourth board in the 40th Chess Olympiad (women) in Istanbul (+4, =0, −3).

Bollengier was married in 2005 and had two children. She died on 28 May 2021, at age 46, of an undisclosed illness.
