= Aldo Haïk =

French chess player

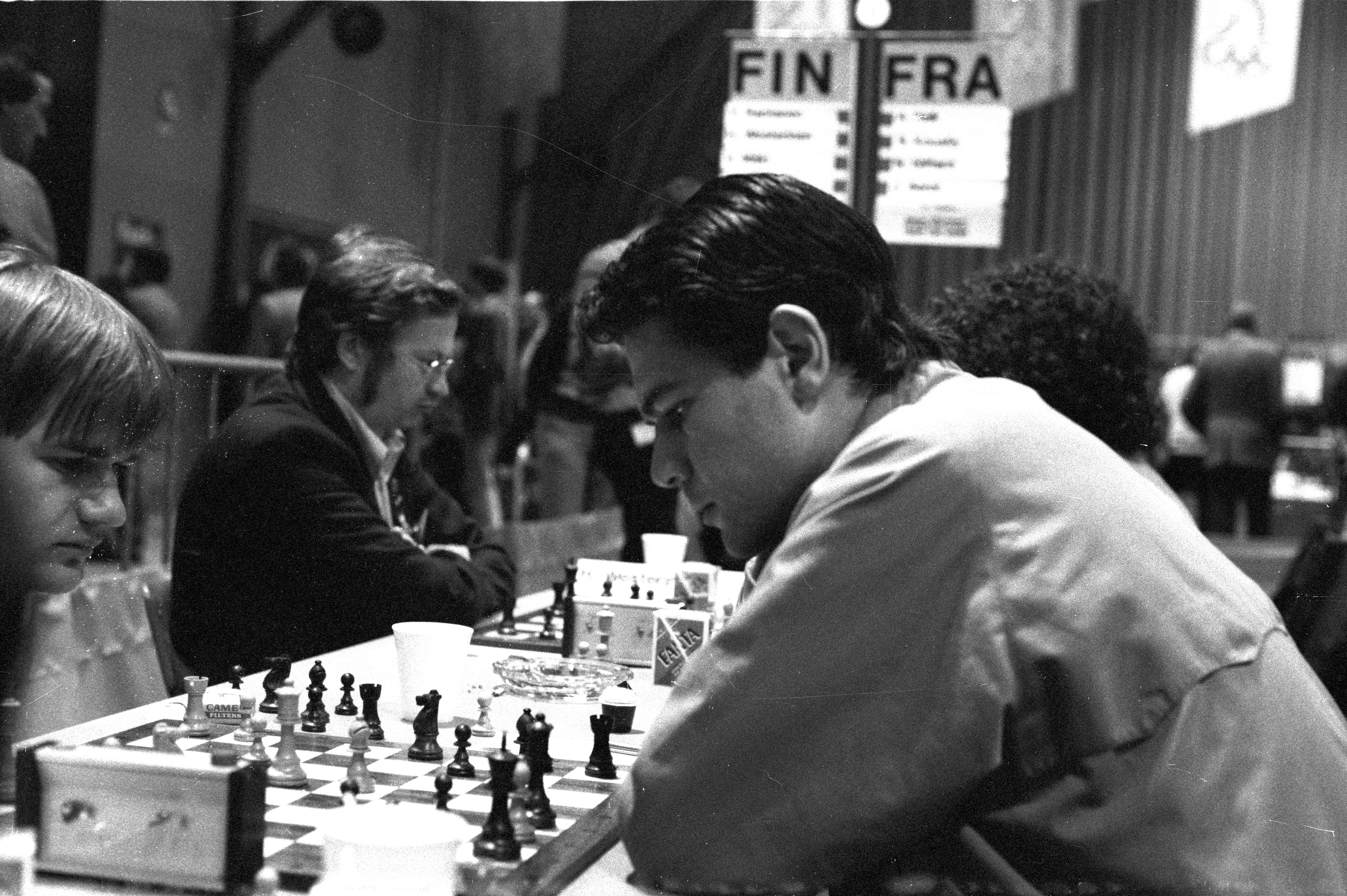

Personal information
- Born: 17 April 1952 (age 74) Tunis, Tunisia

Chess career
- Country: France
- Title: International Master (1977)
- Peak rating: 2475 (January 1986)

Aldo Haïk (born 17 April 1952) is a French chess International Master (IM) (1977), two-times French Chess Championship winner (1972, 1983), Chess Olympiad individual gold medal winner (1972), World Team Chess Championship individual bronze medal winner (1985).

== Biography ==
In the 1970s and 1980s Aldo Haïk was one of the leading French chess players. He twice winning gold medal in French Chess Championship: in 1972 in Rosny-sous-Bois and in 1983 in Belfort. In 1977, he was awarded the FIDE International Master (IM) title. In 1985, he was the first French player to earn a chess grandmaster norm. Aldo Haïk has successfully participated in international chess tournaments where he has won or shared 1st place: Berga (1976), Stara Zagora (1977), London (1978, 1979), Bagneux (1981), Metz (1995).

Aldo Haïk played for France in the Chess Olympiads:

- In 1972, at second reserve board in the 20th Chess Olympiad in Skopje (+11, =0, -1) and won individual gold medal,
- In 1978, at first board in the 23rd Chess Olympiad in Buenos Aires (+4, =4, -5),
- In 1980, at first board in the 24th Chess Olympiad in La Valletta (+5, =5, -3),
- In 1982, at first board in the 25th Chess Olympiad in Lucerne (+4, =2, -6),
- In 1984, at second board in the 26th Chess Olympiad in Thessaloniki (+4, =3, -5),
- In 1986, at second board in the 27th Chess Olympiad in Dubai (+4, =5, -2),
- In 1988, at first reserve board in the 28th Chess Olympiad in Thessaloniki (+5, =2, -2).

Aldo Haïk played for France in the World Team Chess Championship:

- In 1985, at third board in the 1st World Team Chess Championship in Lucerne (+5, =3, -1) and won individual bronze medal.

Aldo Haïk played for France in the European Team Chess Championship:

- In 1989, at sixth board in the 9th European Team Chess Championship in Haifa (+1, =1, -2).

Aldo Haïk played for France in the World Student Team Chess Championship:

- In 1974, at first board in the 20th World Student Team Chess Championship in Teesside (+6, =2, -3).

Aldo Haïk finished his professional chess career in the early 1990s. He worked as a chess editor for the newspaper Le Figaro. Aldo Haïk has written several books on chess:

- Les Échecs, 4 tournois pour un titre, Un jeune français maître international, Aldo Haïk, Hatier, 1978
- Le Jeu d'échecs, c'est facile, 1982 (ISBN 978-2-226-01313-2)
- Les Échecs spectaculaires: 150 chefs-d'œuvre de l'histoire des échecs; Parties, études, problèmes, 1984 (ISBN 2-226-01965-0)
