= Maurice Raizman =

French chess master

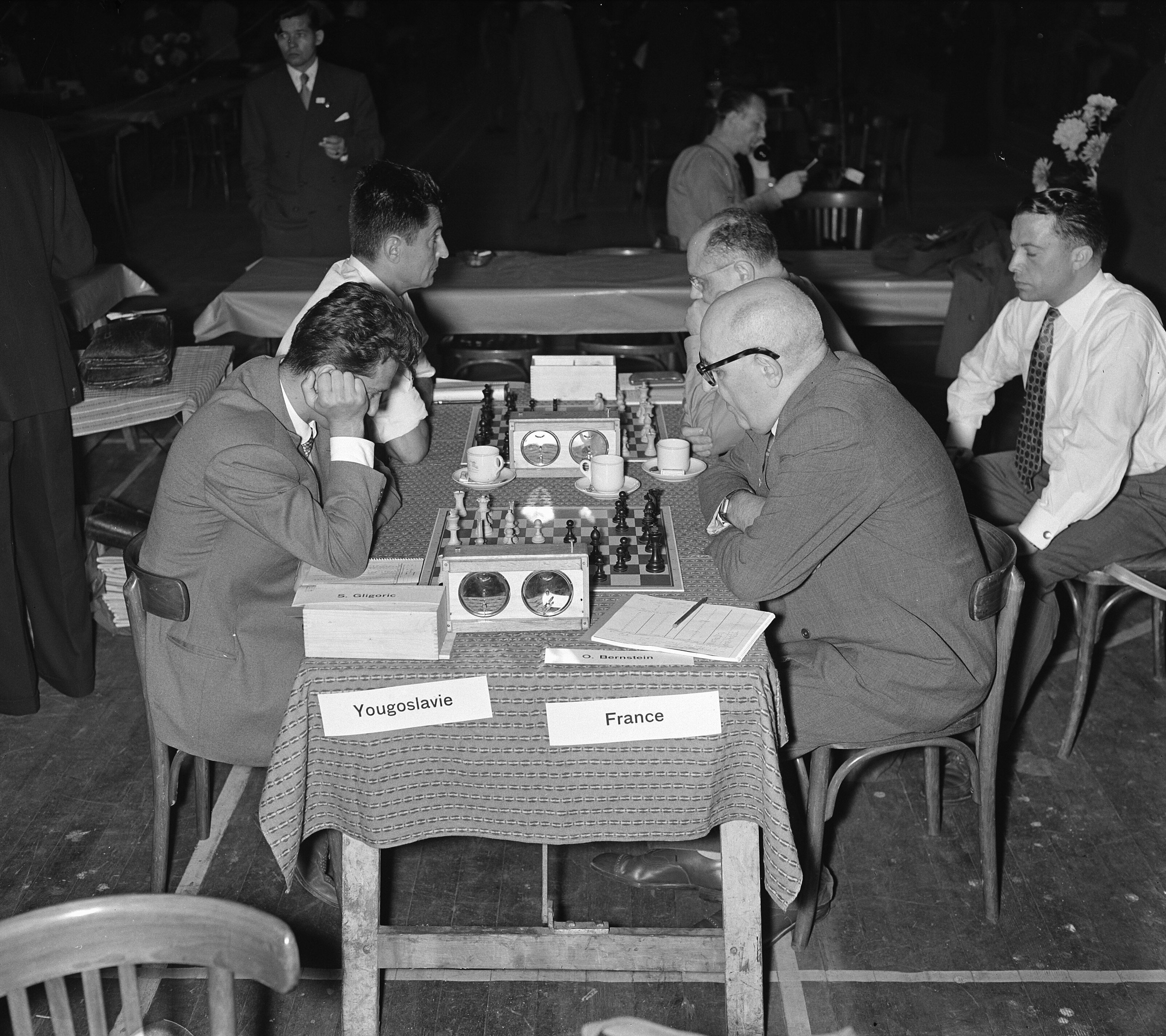
Raizman (right, playing white) vs. Petar Trifunović (1954)

Maurice Raizman (né Miron Raizman) (26 February 1905, Bendery – 1 April 1974, Paris) was a French chess master.

Born into a Jewish family in Bendery (then in Russian Empire), he emigrated to France. He was six-times French Champion (1932, 1936, 1946, 1947, 1951, and 1952) and Paris Champion in 1938. He shared first with Victor Kahn in 16th Paris Championship 1934, and tied for 1st-2nd with Aristide Gromer in 17th French Championship at Nice 1938. He took 2nd, behind Stepan Popel, in the Paris Championship 1953.

Raizman played for France in Chess Olympiads:

- In 1935, at first reserve board in 6th Chess Olympiad in Warsaw (+4 –4 =8);
- In 1954, at second board in 11th Chess Olympiad in Amsterdam (+5 –6 =5);
- In 1958, at first board in 13th Chess Olympiad in Munich (+1 –7 =5);
- In 1972, at first reserve board in 20th Chess Olympiad in Skopje (+8 –1 =1).
