= Jean-Luc Seret =

French chess player (1951–2024)

Personal information
- Born: 14 September 1951 Rouen, France
- Died: 19 March 2024 (aged 72)

Chess career
- Country: France
- Title: International Master (1982)
- Peak rating: 2455 (January 1985)

Jean-Luc Seret (14 September 1951 – 19 March 2024) was a French chess player, International Master and four-time winner of the French Chess Championship.

== Playing career ==
Seret was a member of the French team at the 1974, 1976, 1980, 1982 and 1984 Chess Olympiad. He obtained the International Master title in 1982. Seret won the French Chess Championship in 1980, 1981, 1984 and 1985. During the 1989 Championship, Seret was involved in a violent altercation with Gilles Andruet who subsequently withdrew from the tournament.

== Personal life ==
Born in Rouen, France on 14 September 1951, he died on 19 March 2024, at the age of 72.
