= Maria Leconte =

French chess player (born 1970)

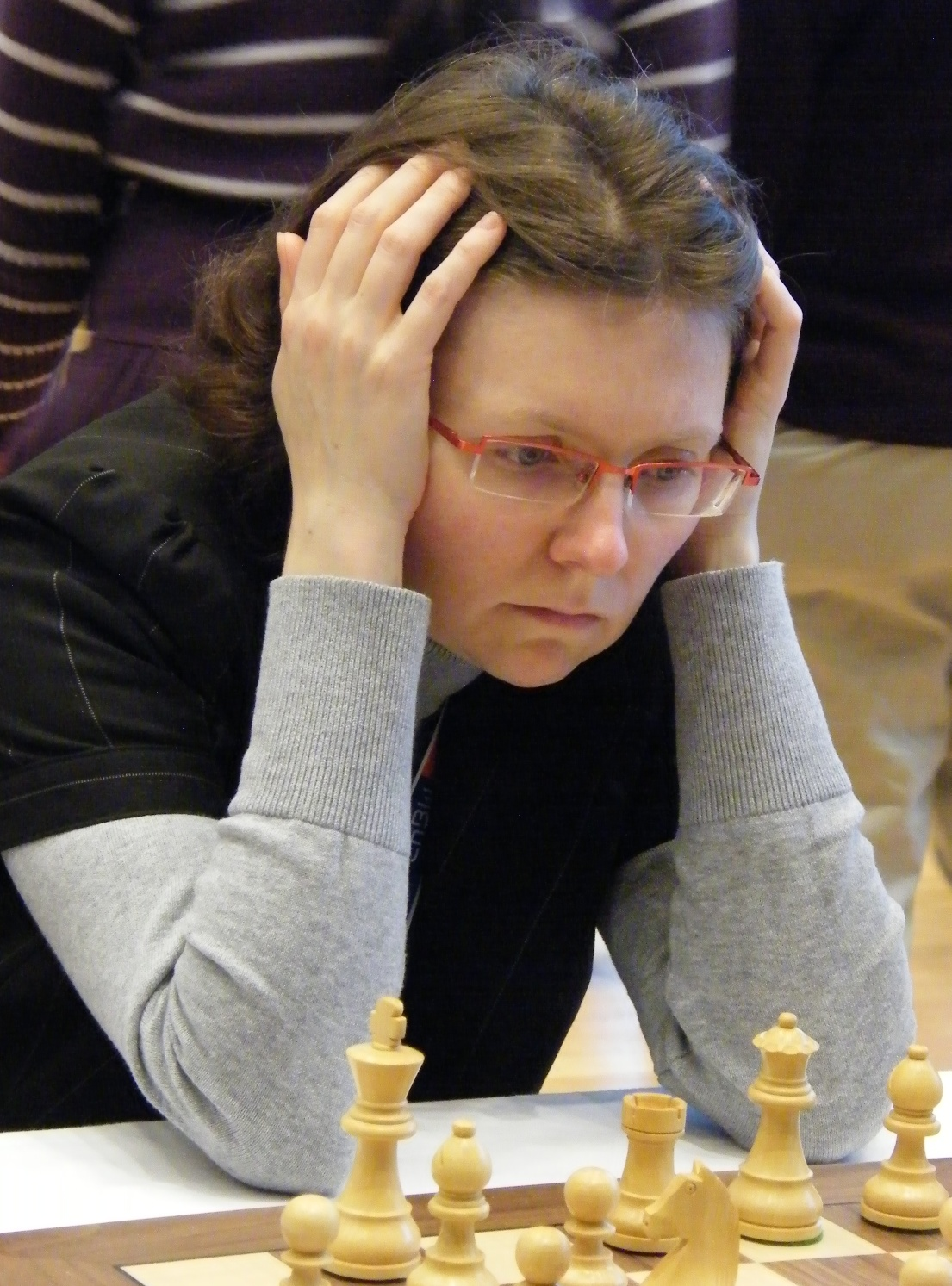
- Maria Leconte in 2008

Personal information
- Born: 12 March 1970 (age 56)

Chess career
- Country: Soviet Union; Ukraine; France (from 1998)
- Title: Woman Grandmaster (2002)
- Peak rating: 2377 (January 2007)

Maria Leconte (née Nepeina, also Nepeina-Leconte; born 12 March 1970) is a Ukrainian and French chess Woman Grandmaster (WGM, 2002). She is Ukrainian Women's Chess Championship three times winner (1989, 1991, 1992), French Women's Chess Championship winner (2001), European Women's Team Chess Championship winner (2001).

== Biography ==
In the late 1980s, she competed in the finals of the Soviet Union Youth Chess Championships. In 1990, in Odesa she won a bronze medal in Academic World Championship. She three times won Ukrainian Women's Chess Championships: 1989, 1991, and 1992.

She has been representing France since 1998. In 1999, in Saint-Vincent she participated in Women's World Chess Championship West Europe Zonal Tournament and shared 2nd-3rd place (behind Monica Calzetta Ruiz) but lost additional match for 2nd place to Jovanka Houska with 1½:2½.

She won seven medals in French Women's Chess Championships: gold (2001), 2 silver (2008, 2009) and 4 bronze (1999, 2005, 2006, 2010).

Maria Leconte played for France in the Women's Chess Olympiads:

- In 2000, at first board in the 34th Chess Olympiad (women) in Istanbul (+3, =6, -3),
- In 2002, at third board in the 35th Chess Olympiad (women) in Bled (+4, =3, -4),
- In 2006, at second board in the 37th Chess Olympiad (women) in Turin (+3, =2, -4),
- In 2008, at reserve board in the 38th Chess Olympiad (women) in Dresden (+3, =4, -1).

Maria Leconte played for France in the European Women's Team Chess Championships:

- In 2001, at first board in the 4th European Team Chess Championship (women) in León (+2, =1, -2) and won team gold medal,
- In 2007, at fourth board in the 7th European Team Chess Championship (women) in Heraklion (+3, =3, -3),
- In 2009, at reserve board in the 8th European Team Chess Championship (women) in Novi Sad (+4, =0, -2),
- In 2011, at reserve board in the 9th European Team Chess Championship (women) in Porto Carras (+2, =2, -1).

In 2002, she was awarded the FIDE Women Grandmaster (WGM) title.
