= Laurent Fressinet =

French chess grandmaster (born 1981)

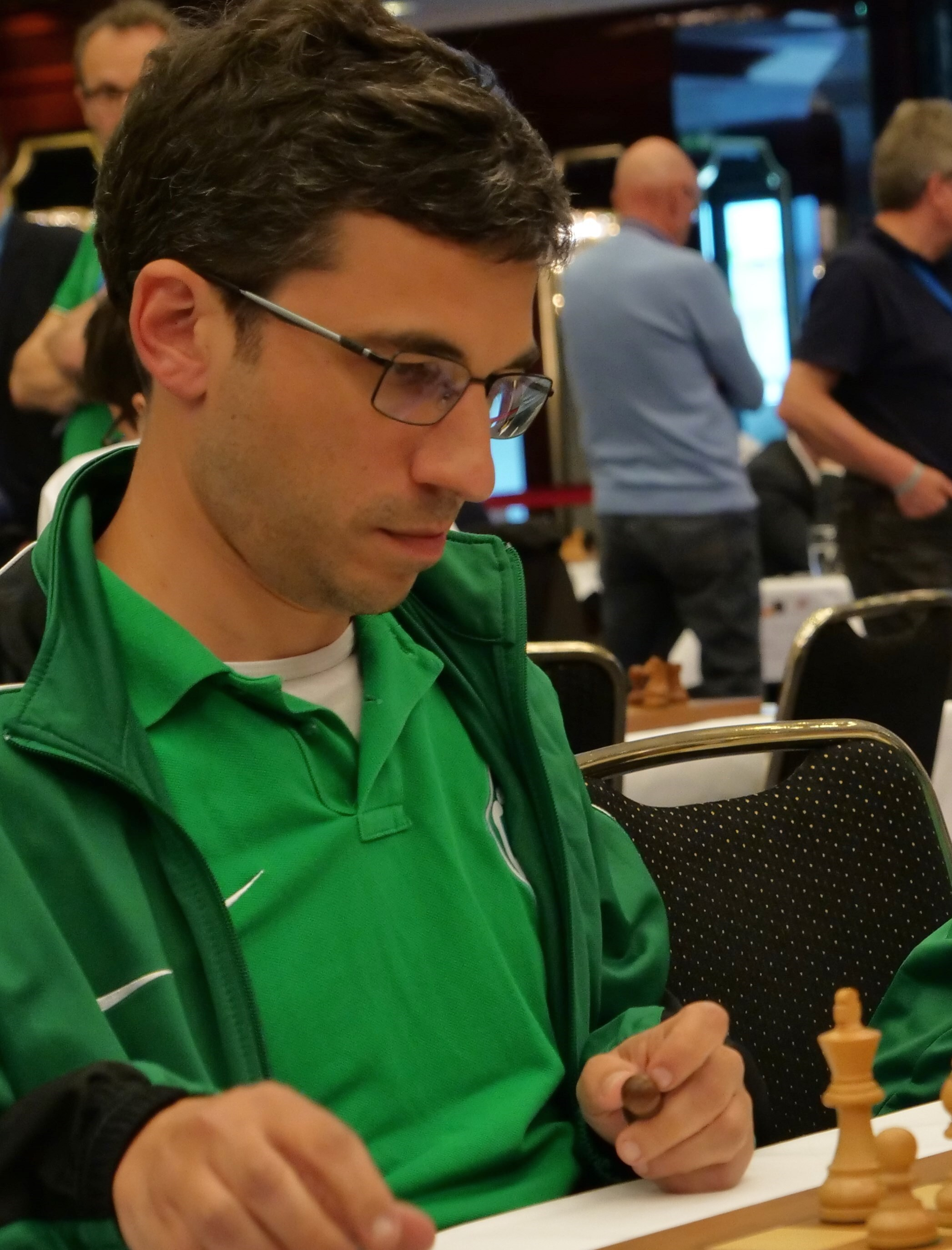
- Fressinet in 2018

Personal information
- Born: 30 November 1981 (age 44) Dax, Landes, France
- Spouse: Almira Skripchenko (m. 2007)

Chess career
- Country: France
- Title: Grandmaster (2000)
- FIDE rating: 2608 (July 2026)
- Peak rating: 2720 (June 2015)
- Peak ranking: No. 27 (September 2010)

Laurent Fressinet (French pronunciation: [loʁɑ̃ fʁɛsiˈnɛ]; born 30 November 1981 in Dax) is a French chess grandmaster. He is a two-time French Chess Champion.

== Career ==
He won the French Chess Championship in 2010 and 2014. In 2012 he finished second in the European Individual Chess Championship in Plovdiv.

Twice runner-up at the European Blitz Championship, in 2006 and 2007, and French Rapid Chess Champion in 2009, 2011 and 2022, Fressinet won the last leg of the French Rapid Grand-Prix in Villandry and finished second in the Grand-Prix Final in Ajaccio in 2012.

In the 2013 Alekhine Memorial tournament, held from 20 April to 1 May, Fressinet finished sixth, with +1−1=7. In May 2014 he won the 22nd Sigeman & Co Chess Tournament in Malmö, Sweden.

In October 2015, Fressinet tied for 1st–3rd with P. Harikrishna and Gabriel Sargissian at the 2nd PokerStars Isle of Man International Chess Tournament in Douglas, Isle of Man and won the 4th Anatoly Karpov Trophy rapid tournament in Cap d'Agde by defeating Karpov himself in the final 3-1.

Fressinet has been Magnus Carlsen's second during all of his World Chess Championship matches: His 2014 World Championship match with Viswanathan Anand, his 2016 World Championship match with Sergey Karjakin, his 2018 World Championship match with Fabiano Caruana and his 2021 World Championship match with Ian Nepomniachtchi.

In April 2019, Fressinet joined chess24 as lead figure of the site's French team together with Josif Dorfman and Jean-Baptiste Mullon.
