= Robert Crépeaux =

French chess player

Robert Crépeaux (24 October 1900, Grasse, Alpes-Maritimes - 10 February 1994, Paris) was a French chess master.

He won three French Chess Championship at Strasbourg 1924, Nice 1925, and Paris 1941. He also won Paris City Chess Championship in 1942.

He played for France in the 2nd Chess Olympiad at The Hague 1928, 3rd unofficial Chess Olympiad at Munich 1936, and the 9th Chess Olympiad at Dubrovnik 1950.
