= Volf Bergraser =

French chess player

Personal information
- Born: 4 January 1904 Novoselytsia, Ukraine
- Died: 13 November 1986 (aged 82)

Chess career
- Country: France
- Title: ICCF Grandmaster (1981)
- ICCF rating: 2444 (July 1992)

Volf Bergraser (4 January 1904 – 13 November 1986), was a French chess master, two times French Chess Championship winner (1957, 1966), International Correspondence Chess Grandmaster (1981).

== Biography ==
Bergraser was born in Bessarabia (then Russian Empire, now the city in which he was born is on the territory of the Chernivtsi region of Ukraine). From the 1950s to the 1970s he was one of the leading French chess players. In French Chess Championship Volf Bergraser won three medals: 2 gold (1957, 1966), and bronze (1971). In 1967, he participated in a strong international chess tournament in Monte Carlo.

He played for France in the Chess Olympiads:

- In 1954, at fourth board in the 11th Chess Olympiad in Amsterdam (+1, =6, -6),
- In 1958, at third board in the 13th Chess Olympiad in Munich (+1, =5, -4),
- In 1960, at third board in the 14th Chess Olympiad in Leipzig (+8, =4, -3),
- In 1962, at second board in the 15th Chess Olympiad in Varna (+6, =4, -4),
- In 1964, at fourth board in the 16th Chess Olympiad in Tel Aviv (+4, =3, -4).

Bergraser played for France in the European Team Chess Championship preliminaries:

- In 1957, at fourth board in the 1st European Team Chess Championship preliminaries (+0, =2, -0).

He has achieved great success in the correspondence chess. He three times won French Correspondence Chess Championship and twice participated in the World Correspondence Chess Championships. In 1959, Volf Bergraser became an International Correspondence Chess Master. In 1981, he was awarded the title of International Correspondence Chess Grandmaster.

Bergraser worked as a medical doctor.
