= Europe Échecs =

French chess magazine

- Editor: Bachar Kouatly
- Categories: Chess magazine
- Frequency: Monthly
- First issue: 1959
- Company: Promotion Jeux de l'Esprit
- Country: France
- Based in: Nice
- Language: French
- Website: http://www.europe-echecs.com/
- ISSN: 0014-2794

Europe Échecs is a monthly French-language chess magazine that has been published since 1959 in Nice, France.

== History and profile ==
Europe Échecs was founded by Raoul Bertolo (died in 1991), who was at the time president of the French chess federation, in 1959. The magazine succeeded l'Échiquier de Turenne. Europe Échecs is the oldest chess magazine in France still running, and is now edited by the French International Grandmaster, Bachar Kouatly.

From 1985 to 1997 Jean-Claude Fasquelle was the chairman of the magazine. He was succeeded by Editions Grasset in the post.

It publishes reports of the principal French, European, and world tournaments with numerous parts analysed by the players themselves (regularly featuring the best in the world), as well as presentations of the chess worlds, tactical exercises, articles about strategy, and announcements of future tournaments. In addition, it offers video reports from major chess tournaments.
