= Paulette Schwartzmann =

Argentine-French chess player

Paulette Schwartzmann (November 19, 1894 – 1953?) was a French-Argentine chess player.

Born in Kamenetz, Russian Empire, she emigrated to France around 1915. Schwartzmann won seven times the French women's chess championship (1927, 1928, 1929, 1931, 1933, 1935, and 1938), although she was awarded the title only thrice. She became a French citizen on 21 December 1932.

She played twice in the Women's World Chess Championship. In 1933, she took 6th at Folkestone (Vera Menchik won). In 1939, she tied for 9-10th at Buenos Aires (Vera Menchik–Stevenson won).

In September 1939, when World War II broke out, Schwartzmann, along with many other participants of the 8th Chess Olympiad, decided to stay permanently in Argentina. She was Argentine women's champion in 1948, 1949, 1950 and 1952.
