= Alice Tonini =

Italian chess master

Alice Tonini was an Italian chess master. She was an Italian citizen who lived in France. Tonini won the French Chess Championship in Paris in 1932, 1933, and 1934. She took fifth place in the fourth Women's World Chess Championship which was held during the 5th Chess Olympiad at Folkestone 1933 (Vera Menchik won). In 1934, she played at Milan (torneo principale, Mario Napolitano won).
