= Manuel Apicella =

French chess grandmaster (born 1970)

Personal information
- Born: April 19, 1970 (age 56) Longjumeau, France

Chess career
- Country: France
- Title: Grandmaster (1995)
- FIDE rating: 2448 (July 2026)
- Peak rating: 2560 (July 1996)

Manuel Apicella (born 19 April 1970 in Longjumeau, France) is a French chess grandmaster.

Apicella was awarded the title International Master in 1989 and the GM title in 1995.

In 1990 he won the Paris City Chess Championship. He won the French Chess Championship in 1992 at a category 7 event in Strasbourg. He won the French Team Championship eight times, 1986 playing for Caissa, 1989, 1996, 1997, 1999, 2007 and 2008 for Clichy and 2010 for Châlons-en-Champagne. He won the French Team Cup five times, in 1992, 1996, 1998, 2001 and 2006. In the British 4NCL (Four Nations Chess League) he played for the team Wood Green Hilsmark Kingfisher.

Playing for the French U26 national team he won a bronze medal in the U26 world championship in Paranaguá in 1993. At the European Team Chess Championships he played twice for the French National Team (1989 and 1992). He played for France at three Chess Olympiads, in 1994, 1996 and 2000.
