= Éloi Relange =

French chess grandmaster (born 1976)

Personal information
- Born: July 1, 1976 (age 50)

Chess career
- Country: France
- Title: Grandmaster (1998)
- FIDE rating: 2430 (July 2026)
- Peak rating: 2513 (July 2003)

Éloi Relange is a French chess grandmaster and poker player.

== Career ==
He is the son of painter Jean-Maxime Relange and has played with the Paris chess club Clichy. He earned his GM title in 1998, though gradually stepped away from professional chess beginning in 2005.

He is also a poker player, and finished in first place in a € 500 No Limit Hold'em - Freezeout tournament in Paris in March 2008. He has also written articles for Live Poker.

In April 2021, he became the president of the French Chess Federation. In May 2022, he led the federation to become part of the French National Olympic and Sports Committee.
