= French Chess Championship =

National chess tournament of France

The French Chess Championship is the annual, national chess tournament of France. It was officially first played in 1923 after the formation of the Fédération Française des Echecs in 1921. The first unofficial national tournament was played in 1880, in the Café de la Régence, where further edition were held in 1881 and 1883. The 1903 and 1914 tournaments were the first real predecessors of the official championship. They ran under the name Championnat de France des amateurs (Championship of the chess enthusiasts).

== Unofficial championships ==
#	Championship	Year	City	Winner
(1)	National-ch	1880	Paris	Samuel Rosenthal
(2)	National-ch	1881	Paris	Edward Chamier
(3)	National-ch	1883	Paris	Albert Clerc
(1)	Amateur-ch	1903	Arcachon	Adolphe Silbert
(2)	Amateur-ch	1914	Lyon	Alphonse Goetz

== Official championships ==
#	Year	City	Winner
1	1923	Paris	Georges Renaud
2	1924	Strasbourg	Robert Crépeaux
3	1925	Nice	Robert Crépeaux
4	1926	Biarritz	André Chéron
5	1927	Chamonix	André Chéron
6	1928	Marseille	Aimé Gibaud
7	1929	Saint-Claude	André Chéron
8	1930	Rouen	Aimé Gibaud
9	1931	Lille	André Muffang
10	1932	La Baule	Maurice Raizman
11	1933	Sarreguemines	Aristide Gromer
12	1934	Paris	Victor Kahn
13	1935	Saint-Alban-les-Eaux	Aimé Gibaud
14	1936	Paris	Maurice Raizman
15	1937	Toulouse	Aristide Gromer
16	1938	Nice	Aristide Gromer
**	1939	The 17th French championship was scheduled to be played in Le Havre and Rouen from 8 to 17 September 1939, but was cancelled after the outbreak of World War II.	
**	1940	The Dictionnaire des Echecs by François Le Lionnais and Ernst Maget (PUF, Paris, 1974) states that a French championship was held in 1940 in Nice and was won by Aimé Gibaud; but no corroborating evidence of such a tournament has been found.	
17	1941	Paris	Robert Crépeaux
18	1942	Paris	Roger Daniel
19	1943	Pau	Louis Bigot
**	1944	Paris The 20th French championship was scheduled to be played from August 17 to 27, but the tournament was abandoned after the second round on August 18 due to the liberation of the city by Allied forces.	
20	1945	Roubaix	César Boutteville
21	1946	Bordeaux	Maurice Raizman
22	1947	Rouen	Maurice Raizman
23	1948	Paris	Nicolas Rossolimo
24	1949	Besançon	Claude Hugot
25	1950	Aix-en-Provence	César Boutteville
26	1951	Vichy	Maurice Raizman
27	1952	Charleville	Maurice Raizman
28	1953	Paris	Savielly Tartakower
29	1954	Marseille	César Boutteville
30	1955	Toulouse	César Boutteville
31	1956	Vittel	Pierre Rolland
32	1957	Bordeaux	Volf Bergraser
33	1958	Le Touquet	Claude Lemoine
34	1959	Reims	César Boutteville
35	1961	Paris	Guy Mazzoni
36	1962	Paris	André Thiellement
37	1963	Paris	André Thiellement
38	1964	Montpellier	Michel Roos
39	1965	Dunkerque	Guy Mazzoni
40	1966	Grenoble	Volf Bergraser
41	1967	Dieppe	César Boutteville
42	1968	Charbonnières-les-Bains	Jean-Claude Letzelter
43	1969	Pau	Jacques Planté
44	1970	Mulhouse	Jacques Maclès
45	1971	Mérignac	Jean-Claude Letzelter
46	1972	Rosny-sous-Bois	Aldo Haïk
47	1973	Vittel	Michel Benoit
48	1974	Chambéry	Jean-Claude Letzelter
49	1975	Dijon	Miodrag Todorcevic
50	1976	Saint-Jean-de-Monts	François Chevaldonnet
51	1977	Le Touquet	Louis Roos
52	1978	Castelnaudary	Nicolas Giffard
53	1979	Courchevel	Bachar Kouatly
54	1980	Puteaux	Jean-Luc Seret
55	1981	Vitrolles	Jean-Luc Seret
56	1982	Schiltigheim	Nicolas Giffard
57	1983	Belfort	Aldo Haïk
58	1984	Alès	Jean-Luc Seret
59	1985	Clermont-Ferrand	Jean-Luc Seret
60	1986	Épinal	Gilles Mirallès
61	1987	Rouen	Christophe Bernard
62	1988	Val Thorens	Gilles Andruet
63	1989	Épinal	Gilles Mirallès
64	1990	Angers	Marc Santo-Roman
65	1991	Montpellier	Marc Santo-Roman
66	1992	Strasbourg	Manuel Apicella
67	1993	Nantes	Emmanuel Bricard
68	1994	Chambéry	Marc Santo-Roman
69	1995	Toulouse	Éric Prié
70	1996	Auxerre	Christian Bauer
71	1997	Narbonne	Anatoly Vaisser
72	1998	Méribel	Josif Dorfman
73	1999	Besançon	Étienne Bacrot
74	2000	Vichy	Étienne Bacrot
75	2001	Marseille	Étienne Bacrot
76	2002	Val-d'Isère	Étienne Bacrot
77	2003	Aix-les-Bains	Étienne Bacrot
78	2004	Val-d'Isère	Joël Lautier
79	2005	Chartres	Joël Lautier
80	2006	Besançon	Vladislav Tkachiev
81	2007	Aix-les-Bains	Maxime Vachier-Lagrave
82	2008	Pau	Étienne Bacrot
83	2009	Nîmes	Vladislav Tkachiev
84	2010	Belfort	Laurent Fressinet
85	2011	Caen	Maxime Vachier-Lagrave
86	2012	Pau	Romain Edouard, Maxime Vachier-Lagrave, Christian Bauer, Étienne Bacrot (Note: Edouard, Vachier-Lagrave, Bacrot and Bauer were tied on a score of 7/10 going into the final round, when news broke of the death of Christian Bauer's four month-old child. The players decided to cancel the 11th and final round. Edouard, Vachier-Lagrave and Bacrot were to play off for the title, but on further reflection it was decided that all four players should share the title.)
87	2013	Nancy	Hicham Hamdouchi
88	2014	Nîmes	Laurent Fressinet
89	2015	Saint Quentin	Christian Bauer
90	2016	Agen	Matthieu Cornette
91	2017	Agen	Étienne Bacrot
92	2018	Nîmes	Tigran Gharamian
93	2019	Chartres	Maxime Lagarde
**	2020	cancelled due to COVID-19 pandemic	
**	2021	cancelled due to COVID-19 pandemic	
94	2022	Albi	Jules Moussard
95	2023	Alpe d'Huez	Yannick Gozzoli
96	2024	Alpe d'Huez	Jules Moussard
97	2025	Vichy	Marc'Andria Maurizzi
98	2026	Vichy	Étienne Bacrot

== Women's winners ==
Year	City	Winner
1924	Paris	Marie Jeanne Frigard
1925	Paris	Paulette Schwartzmann (off contest); Marie Jeanne Frigard
1926	Paris	Marie Jeanne Frigard
1927	Paris	Paulette Schwartzmann (off contest); Marie Jeanne Frigard
1928	Paris	Paulette Schwartzmann (off contest); Jeanne D'Autremont
1929	Paris	Paulette Schwartzmann (off contest); Jeanne D'Autremont
1931	Paris	Paulette Schwartzmann (off contest); Louise Pape
1932	Paris	Alice Tonini (off contest); Jeanne D'Autremont
1933	Paris	Alice Tonini (off contest); Paulette Schwartzmann
1934	Paris	Alice Tonini (off contest); Maud Flandin
1935	Paris	Paulette Schwartzmann
1936	Paris	Chantal Chaudé de Silans
1937	Toulouse	Angles D'Auriac
1938	Nice	Paulette Schwartzmann
1941	Paris	Long
1942	Paris	Duval
1943	Paris	Suzanne Dehelly

- No contest held between 1944 and 1954

Year	City	Winner
1955	Toulouse	Vazeille
1956	Vittel	Isabelle Choko

- No contest held between 1957 and 1974

Year	City	Winner
1975	Paris	Milinka Merlini
1976	Saint-Jean-de-Monts	Milinka Merlini
1977	Le Touquet	Milinka Merlini
1978	Castelnaudary	Milinka Merlini
1979	Courchevel	Monique Ruck-Petit
1980	Paris	Milinka Merlini
1981	Orange	Josiane Legendre
1982	Orange	Martine Dubois
1983	Montpellier	Julia Lebel-Arias
1984	Loches	Isabelle Kientzler
1985	Lille	Christine Leroy
1986	Orange	Julia Lebel-Arias
1987	Baud	Sabine Fruteau
1988	not played	
1989	Orange	Sabine Fruteau
1990	Challes-les-Eaux	Julia Lebel-Arias
1991	Montpellier	Christine Flear (née Leroy)
1992	Le Havre	Claire Gervais
1993	Nantes	Claire Gervais
1994	Chambéry	Christine Flear (née Leroy)
1995	Toulouse	Raphaelle Bujisho (later Raphaelle Delahaye)
1996	Auxerre	Claire Gervais
1997	Bastia	Malina Nicoara
1998	Meribel	Christine Flear (née Leroy)
1999	Besançon	Christine Flear (née Leroy)
2000	Vichy	Marie Sebag
2001	Marseille	Maria Nepeina-Leconte
2002	Val d'Isère	Marie Sebag
2003	Aix-les-Bains	Sophie Milliet
2004	Val d'Isère	Almira Skripchenko
2005	Chartres	Almira Skripchenko
2006	Besançon	Almira Skripchenko
2007	Aix-les-Bains	Silvia Collas
2008	Pau	Sophie Milliet
2009	Nîmes	Sophie Milliet
2010	Belfort	Almira Skripchenko
2011	Caen	Sophie Milliet
2012	Pau	Almira Skripchenko
2013	Nancy	Nino Maisuradze
2014	Nîmes	Nino Maisuradze
2015	Saint Quentin	Almira Skripchenko
2016	Agen	Sophie Milliet
2017	Agen	Sophie Milliet
2018	Nîmes	Pauline Guichard
2019	Chartres	Pauline Guichard
2022	Albi	Almira Skripchenko
2023	Alpe d'Huez	Mitra Hejazipour
2024	Alpe d'Huez	Deimantė Daulyte-Cornette
2025	Vichy	Yosha Iglesias
2026	Vichy	Sophie Milliet

== Some crosstables ==
FRA-ch (Women) 77th Val d'Isere 2002
	Player	Rating	1	2	3	4	5	6	7	8	9	0	1	2	Points	TB	Perf.	+/-
1	Marie Sebag (France)	2344	*	½	½	1	½	1	½	1	1	1	1	1	9		2417	+9
2	Christine Flear (France)	2176	½	*	1	0	1	0	½	1	½	1	1	1	7½	35.50	2304	+19
3	Raphaelle Delahaye (France)	2166	½	0	*	½	1	½	1	0	1	1	1	1	7½	34.75	2305	+21
4	Roza Lallemand (France)	2301	0	1	½	*	½	0	1	1	½	1	1	1	7½	33.75	2293	0
5	Sophie Milliet (France)	2173	½	0	0	½	*	1	½	1	1	1	1	1	7½	32.50	2304	+20
6	Anne Muller (France)	2169	0	1	½	1	0	*	0	0	½	1	1	1	6		2204	+5
7	Friederike Wohlers Armas (France)	2170	½	½	0	0	½	1	*	½	½	½	1	½	5½		2172	0
8	Marina Costagliola (France)	2238	0	0	1	0	0	1	½	*	0	1	½	1	5		2135	-16
9	Claire Marchadour (France)	2081	0	½	0	½	0	½	½	1	*	½	½	½	4½		2116	+5
10	Martine Dubois (France)	2049	0	0	0	0	0	0	½	0	½	*	1	1	3		2014	-6
11	Aurelie Dacalor (France)	2123	0	0	0	0	0	0	0	½	½	0	*	1	2		1916	-27
12	Melanie Verot (France)	2077	½	0	0	0	0	0	½	0	½	0	0	*	1		1781	-30

FRA-ch (Women) 85th Belfort 2010
	Player	Rating	1	2	3	4	5	6	Points	TB	Perf.	+/-
1	Almira Skripchenko (France)	2458	**	½½	½1	1½	½1	½1	7½		2498	+5
2	Sophie Milliet (France)	2367	½½	**	10	00	1½	11	6		2396	+4
3	Maria Nepeina-Leconte (France)	2337	½0	01	**	½1	10	½½	5½		2366	+4
4	Silvia Collas (France)	2333	0½	11	½0	**	½0	½½	5		2333	0
5	Pauline Guichard (France)	2320	½0	0½	01	½1	**	½½	4		2265	-8
6	Marina Roumegous (France)	2181	½0	00	½½	½½	½½	**	2		2123	-6

Average Elo: 2332 <=> Cat: 4

FRA-ch (Women) 86th Caen 2011
	Player	Rating	1	2	3	4	5	6	Points	TB	Perf.	+/-
1	Sophie Milliet (France)	2355	**	½½	½1	1½	½1	½1	7		2445	+12
2	Nino Maisuradze (France)	2329	½½	**	10	00	1½	11	5½		2338	+1
3	Andreea Bollengier (France)	2207	½0	01	**	½1	10	½½	5		2327	+17
4	Pauline Guichard (France)	2305	0½	11	½0	**	½0	½½	4½	22.75	2274	-4
5	Maria Nepeina-Leconte (France)	2327	½0	0½	01	½1	**	½½	4½	21.50	2269	-8
6	Silvia Collas (France)	2323	½0	00	½½	½½	½½	**	3½		2198	-18

Average Elo: 2307 <=> Cat: 3
