= Jean-Claude Letzelter =

French chess player (born 1940)

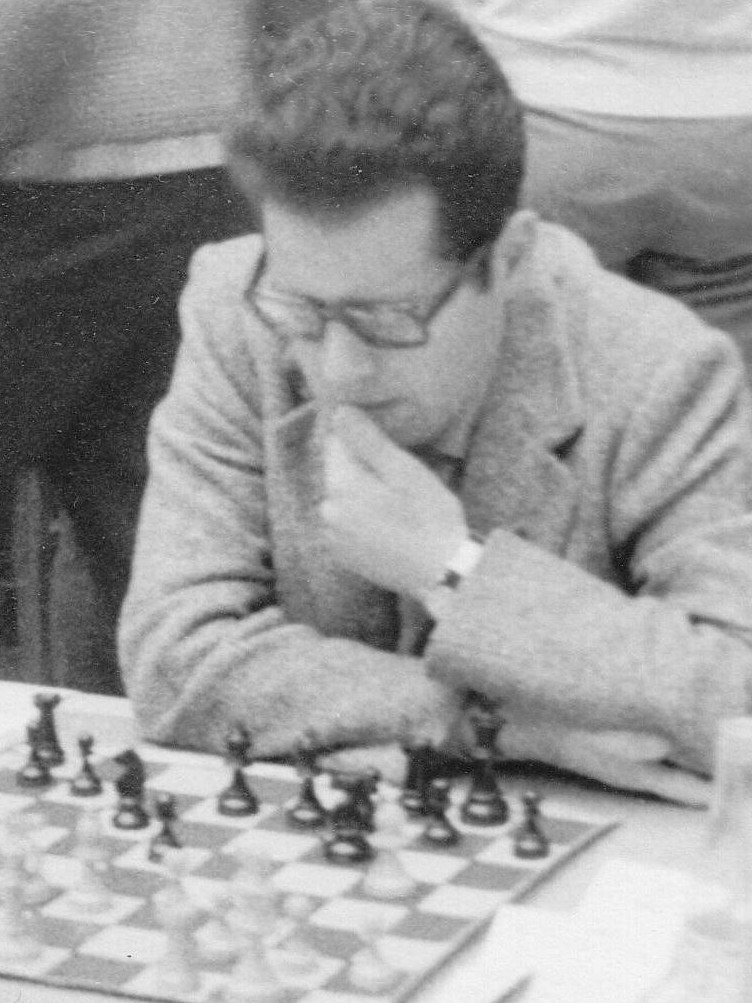
- Jean-Claude Letzelter in 1972

Personal information
- Born: 20 September 1940 (age 85) Sélestat, France

Chess career
- Country: France
- Title: FIDE Master (1987)
- Peak rating: 2310 (July 1986)

Jean-Claude Letzelter (born 20 September 1940) is a French chess FIDE Master (FM) and three times French Chess Championship winner (1968, 1971, 1974).

== Biography ==
From the mid-1960s to the late 1970s, Jean-Claude Letzelter was one of the best French chess players. He played in individual French Chess Championship finals many times, winning three gold medals (1968, 1971, 1974) and a silver medal (1967). In 1975, in Vratsa, he participated in the World Chess Championship Zonal tournament and ranked 16th.

Jean-Claude Letzelter played for France in the Chess Olympiads:

- In 1968, at the second board in the 18th Chess Olympiad in Lugano (+5, =4, -4),
- In 1972, at the third board in the 20th Chess Olympiad in Skopje (+8, =3, -4),
- In 1976, at the second reserve board in the 22nd Chess Olympiad in Haifa (+5, =2, -4),
- In 1978, at the second reserve board in the 23rd Chess Olympiad in Buenos Aires (+3, =2, -3).

Jean-Claude Letzelter played for France in the European Team Chess Championship preliminaries:

- In 1977, at the second board in the 6th European Team Chess Championship preliminaries (+2, =0, -0).
