= Marc Santo-Roman =

French chess grandmaster (born 1960)

Personal information
- Born: 13 September 1960 (age 65) Toulouse, France

Chess career
- Country: France
- Title: Grandmaster (1996)
- FIDE rating: 2369 (May 2019)
- Peak rating: 2500 (January 1991)

Marc Santo-Roman (born 13 September 1960) is a French chess grandmaster, born in Toulouse.

== Chess career ==
He won three French Chess Championship at Angers 1990, Montpellier 1991, and Chambéry 1994 and played for France in the 29th Chess Olympiad at Novi Sad 1990, 30th Chess Olympiad at Manila 1992 and in the 31st Chess Olympiad at Moscow 1994. Santo-Roman was awarded the International Master title in 1984 and the Grandmaster title in 1996.

== Chess strength ==
According to Chessmetrics, at his peak in October 1991 Santo-Roman's play was equivalent to a rating of 2557, and he was ranked number 317 in the world. His best single performance was at FRA-ch Angers, 1990, where he scored 11 of 14 possible points (79%) against 2462-rated opposition, for a performance rating of 2644.

On the April 2009 FIDE list his Elo rating is 2392.

== Notable games ==
- Marc Santo Roman vs Benoit Lepelletier, FRA-ch 1997, Sicilian Defense: Scheveningen Variation, Keres Attack (B81), 1-0
- Suat Atalik vs Marc Santo Roman, Cappelle la Grande 1999, Dutch Defense: Semi-Leningrad Variation (A81), 1/2-1/2
