= Almira Skripchenko =

Moldovan-French chess player (born 1976)

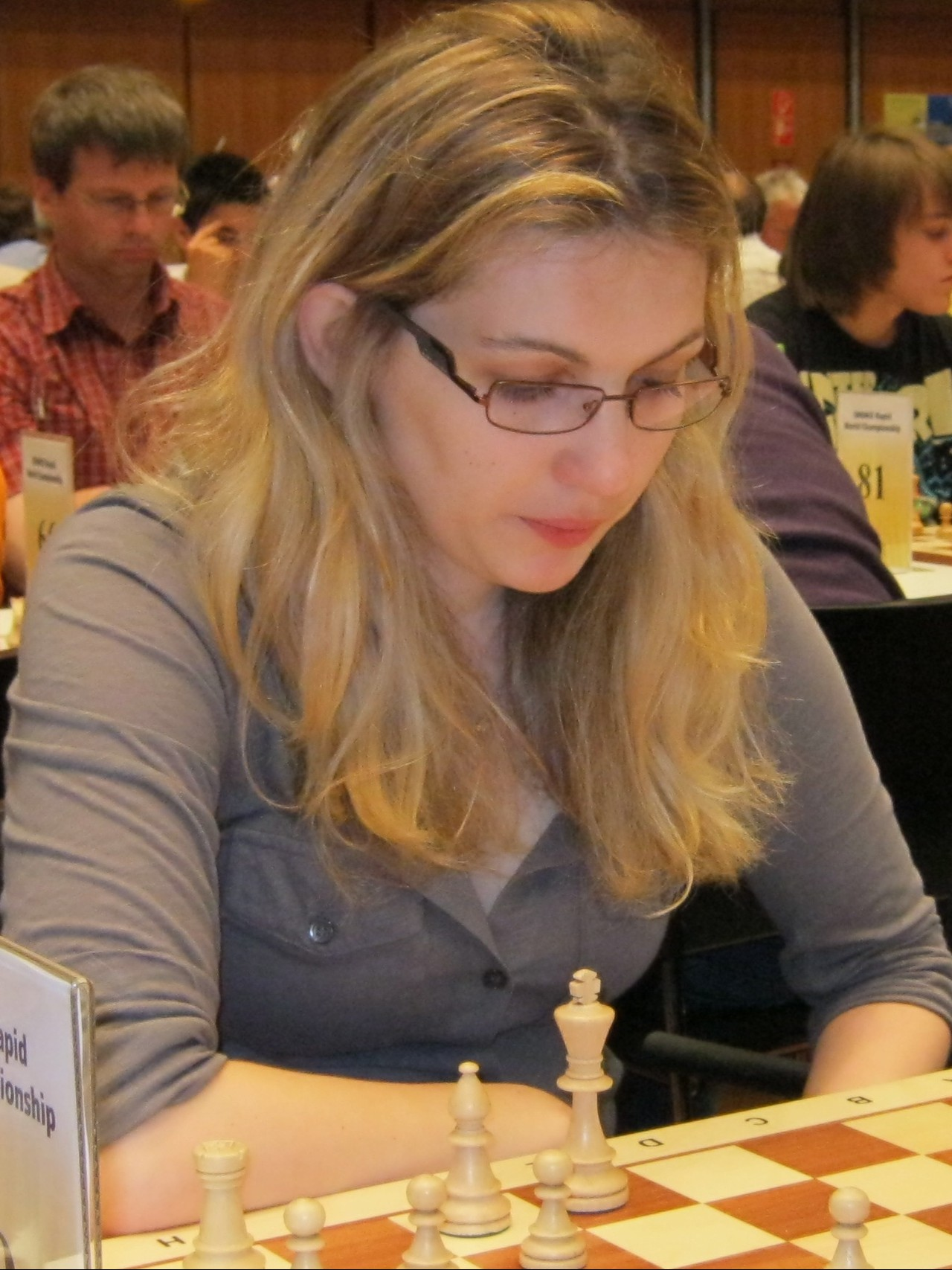
- Skripchenko in 2010

Personal information
- Born: 17 February 1976 (age 50) Chișinău, Moldavian SSR, Soviet Union
- Spouses: Joël Lautier (m. 1997; div. 2002) Laurent Fressinet (m. 2007)

Chess career
- Country: Moldova (before 2001); France (after 2001)
- Title: International Master (1998); Woman Grandmaster (1995)
- Peak rating: 2501 (January 2003)

Almira Skripchenko (born 17 February 1976) is a Moldovan-French chess player who holds the titles of International Master (IM) and Woman Grandmaster (WGM). She won the European Women's Individual Chess Championship in 2001, and is a seven-time French Women's Chess Champion.

== Chess ==
Born in Chișinău to a Ukrainian father and an Armenian mother, both pedagogues and chess coaches, Skripchenko started playing chess when she was 6 years old. Her mother Naira Agababyan was 7-times Moldovan women's chess champion.

In 1991, Moldova became independent from the Soviet Union, so that Skripchenko could take part for the first time in the World Youth Chess Championships. She was crowned World Under-16 girls champion in 1992 at Duisburg, Germany and in 1993, she took the bronze medal at the World Under-18 girls championship.

She married French grandmaster Joël Lautier in 1997 and moved to France. She became a French citizen in 2001, and continued to live in France after separating from Lautier in 2002. In 2001, at 25 years old, she celebrated her biggest success, winning the Women's European Individual Chess Championship. She was at this time chosen "best sportsperson in 2001 in Moldova" and decorated with the Order of National Merit in her native country.

Skripchenko then married French grandmaster Laurent Fressinet and, in January 2007, gave birth to a daughter.

In 2004, she won the North Urals Cup, the second international super-tournament for female chess players. Held in Krasnoturinsk, the nine-round single round-robin tournament featured ten of the strongest female players in the world. Skripchenko finished a half point ahead of Maia Chiburdanidze, the former Women's World Champion, and also defeated her in their individual encounter. In 2005, she won the Accentus Ladies Tournament in Biel. Skripchenko reached the quarter-finals at the Women's World Chess Championship in 2000, 2001 and 2010.

Living in Paris and representing France in tournaments since 2002, Skripchenko has become a noted ambassador for the game in Europe. She competed in the Men's French Individual Championship in 2002 and 2003. She won the Ladies' French Chess Championship in 2004, 2005, 2006, 2010, 2012 and 2015. In team play, she won the French National Chess League with NAO Chess Club (2003 and 2004) and with Clichy Echecs (2007, 2008, 2012 and 2013) and the German Chess Bundesliga with Werder Bremen (2005). Her career victories also include three Nationale ladies titles (which she earned with Baden-Oos in 2003, 2004, and 2005) and five European Club Cup victories with Cercle d'échecs de Monte-Carlo (in 2007, 2008, 2010, 2012 and 2013).

Almira Skripchenko has taken part in several Chess Olympiads (with Moldova, then with France), each time playing on her team's top board. She is also a member of the ACP Board (Association of Chess Professionals).

== Poker ==
Skripchenko has also played in major poker tournaments. In 2009, she finished seventh in a World Series of Poker No Limit Texas hold 'em tournament, winning US$78,664. In 2010, she won $84,827 for a third-place finish in the €1,000 France Poker Tour Season 5 Grand Final. In 2011, she won $50,000 when she finished second in the World Poker Tour celebrity invitational tournament. Her poker tournament winnings exceeded $250,000 by 2026.

== Shogi ==
Skripchenko also plays shogi.
