= French Chess Federation =

Governing body of chess in France

- Abbreviation: FFE
- Formation: March 19, 1921
- Headquarters: Asnières-sur-Seine
- Region served: France
- President: Éloi Relange
- Website: http://www.echecs.asso.fr/

The French Chess Federation (French : Fédération Française des Echecs – FFE) is the national organization for chess in France.

== History ==
The French Chess Federation (FFE) was founded on March 19, 1921. The first known attempts to include chess at the Olympic Games were made by the FFE in 1924, coinciding with the Paris Olympics. These attempts were unsuccessful, although the FFE hosted a parallel event to the Paris Olympics instead; this would be the 1st unofficial Chess Olympiad.

On May 23, 2022, the FFE became a member of the French National Olympic and Sports Committee. On June 2, 2022, the FFE partnered with the organization Colosse aux pieds d'argile in order to combat sexual violence and hazing in the sport of chess and to provide support for victims. Following this, the FFE established a Violence Reporting and Prevention Unit.

== See also ==
- French Chess Championship
