= Battle of Réunion =

1942 operation on the island of La Réunion during World War II

- Part of the Indian Ocean theatre of World War II
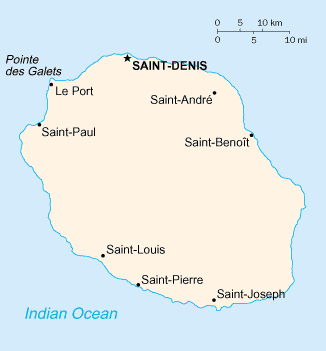
- Map of La Réunion. The invasion forces landed at Saint-Denis; action also took place at Le Port and Pointe des Galets.
Date	28 November 1942
Location	Saint Denis, Réunion 20.9394°S 55.2872°E
Result	Free French victory

Belligerents
Free France	Vichy France

Commanders and leaders
(Free France) Jules Évenou (Free France) André Capagorry	(Vichy France) Pierre Émile Aubert (Vichy France) Émile Hugot (WIA)

Strength
1 destroyer (Léopard); 1 company of Fusiliers Marins; Local resistance	260 men

Casualties and losses
1+ killed	2+ killed 1+ wounded

The Battle of Réunion or Liberation of Réunion (French: Bataille de La Réunion, Libération de La Réunion) was an amphibious landing and uprising which brought the island of Réunion onto the Allied side during the Second World War. The invasion was performed by the Free French Naval Forces (FNFL) destroyer Léopard on 28 November 1942, which toppled the administration loyal to the Vichy French regime and replaced it with a Free French administration.

== Background ==
=== Vichy and Réunion ===
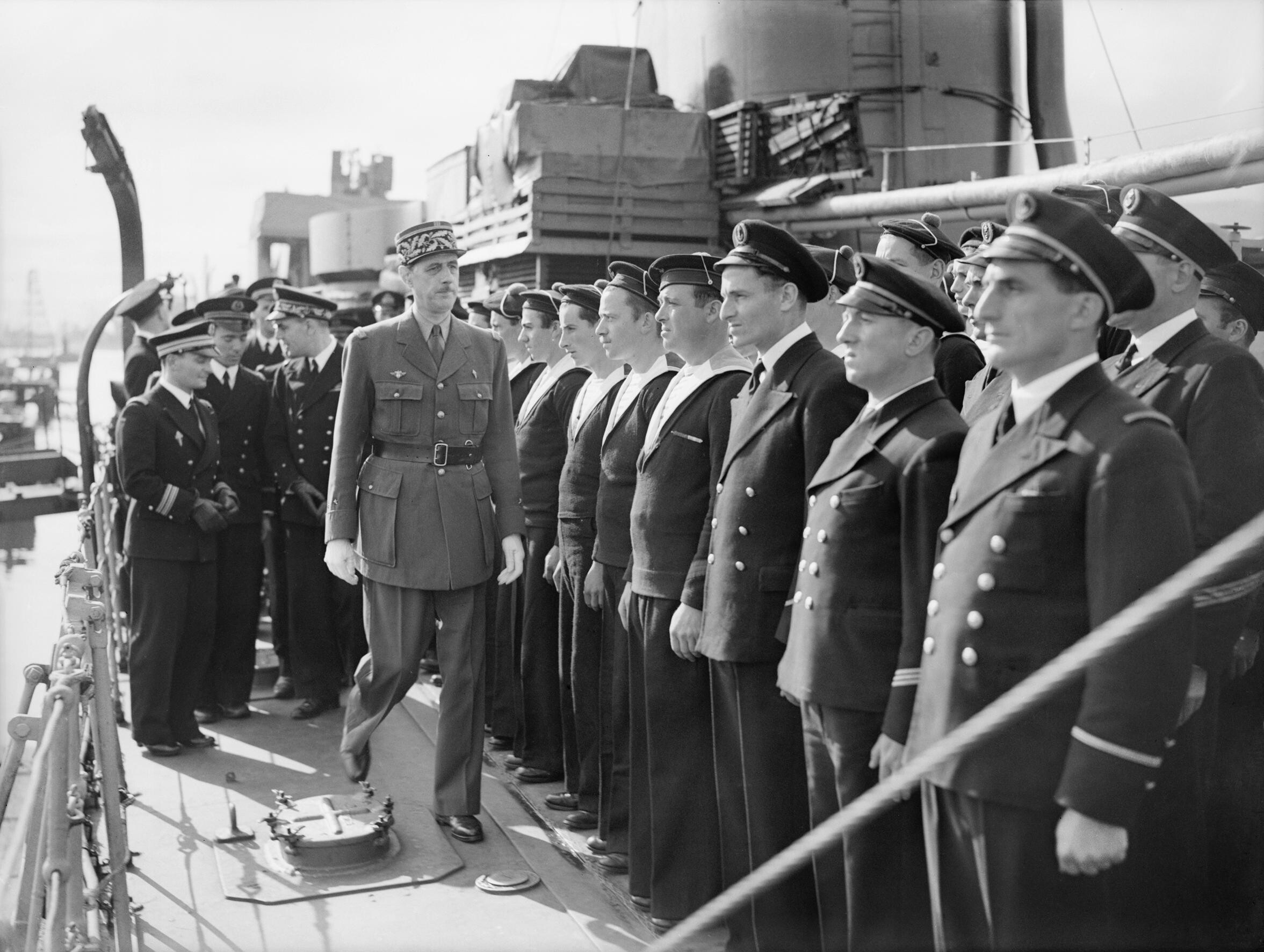
Charles de Gaulle inspecting sailors on the destroyer Léopard in June 1942

Since the Battle of France in May–June 1940, the island of La Réunion had had little strategic importance and little defences as a consequence. The Compiègne Armistice had reduced the military on the island to three officers, one doctor, eleven non-commissioned officers and about 270 men, of which only 23 were professionals. The coastal artillery was out of order.

On 23 June 1940, Raoul Nativel, president of the conseil général, denounced the Armistice on Radio Saint-Denis. The next day the British consul Maurice Gaud met with the governor of the island, Pierre Aubert, proposing to pay the French administration with British treasure if La Réunion would fight on. The proposal became public when Radio Mauritius broadcast it. Aubert consulted with local notabilities, but rather than illegally surrendering the island to a foreign government, he decided to stay loyal to Marshal Philippe Pétain's Vichy French government. Supporters of the French exile government of Charles de Gaulle, General secretary Angelini and captain Plat were transferred, and the president of the colonial commission Adrien Lagourgue was discharged, as well as Nativel.

Governor Aubert, although loyal to the Vichy regime, was relatively moderate in his support of Pétain's policies. He had, however, supreme authority on the island. On the other hand, his cabinet director, Jean-Jacques Pillet, was enthusiastic in his support of the Vichy Révolution nationale, organising censorship, propaganda, a special criminal court, and a pro-Vichy militia.

A local resistance movement soon emerged. On 11 November 1941, for Remembrance Day, about twenty women put flowers on the 1918 memorial at Saint-Denis; they were consequently fined. Communist cells operated under Léon de Lepervanche though kept a low profile. La Réunion also harboured Duy Tân, exiled Emperor of Vietnam, who was a keen radio amateur and managed to communicate with Mauritius; he was detained shortly thereafter and had his equipment confiscated.

=== Strategic situation ===
After the Battle of Singapore, in February 1942, the British Eastern Fleet retreated to Addu Atoll in the Maldives. Then, following Chuichi Nagumo's Indian Ocean raid in early 1942, the Fleet moved its operational base to Kilindini near Mombasa in Kenya, increasing the British presence on the Eastern African coasts. Soon afterwards, the British struck the French possessions of Madagascar, under Vichy Regime control, with Operation Ironclad, on 5 May 1942. La Réunion lost her shipping communications with mainland Africa, and the attack further encouraged anti-British sentiments among the Vichy loyalists. On the other hand, De Gaulle, who had not been involved in Ironclad, felt hard-pressed to re-claim La Réunion from Vichy before the British or Americans would.

On 8 May, Vichy elements in Madagascar signaled that a British cruiser had left South Africa with 600 men aboard to seize the island. Aubert then decided to obstruct the harbour of Le Port by scuttling a ship in the entrance. He also ordered evacuation of the capital of Saint-Denis, so as to avoid a bloody bombing like that at Diego Soares; in the evening, about 9,000 people had moved to La Montagne, Le Brûlé, Saint-François, and Sainte Marie. No bombing materialised, however, and the population gradually returned to its homes.

The incident had highlighted the fact that the island was helpless against any invasion; on 18 September, it was decided that resistance to a landing would be limited to a mere token fight. Some elements of the military were however determined to fiercely resist a British invasion. On 27 September, Saint-Denis was declared open city, while authorities moved to Hell-Bourg, mocked by De Gaulle's supporters.

On 8 November, Operation Torch triggered Case Anton, the German invasion of the so-called "Free Zone", resulting in the scuttling of the French fleet in Toulon. François Darlan emerged as a rival to De Gaulle, negotiating with General Mark Clark.

== Invasion ==
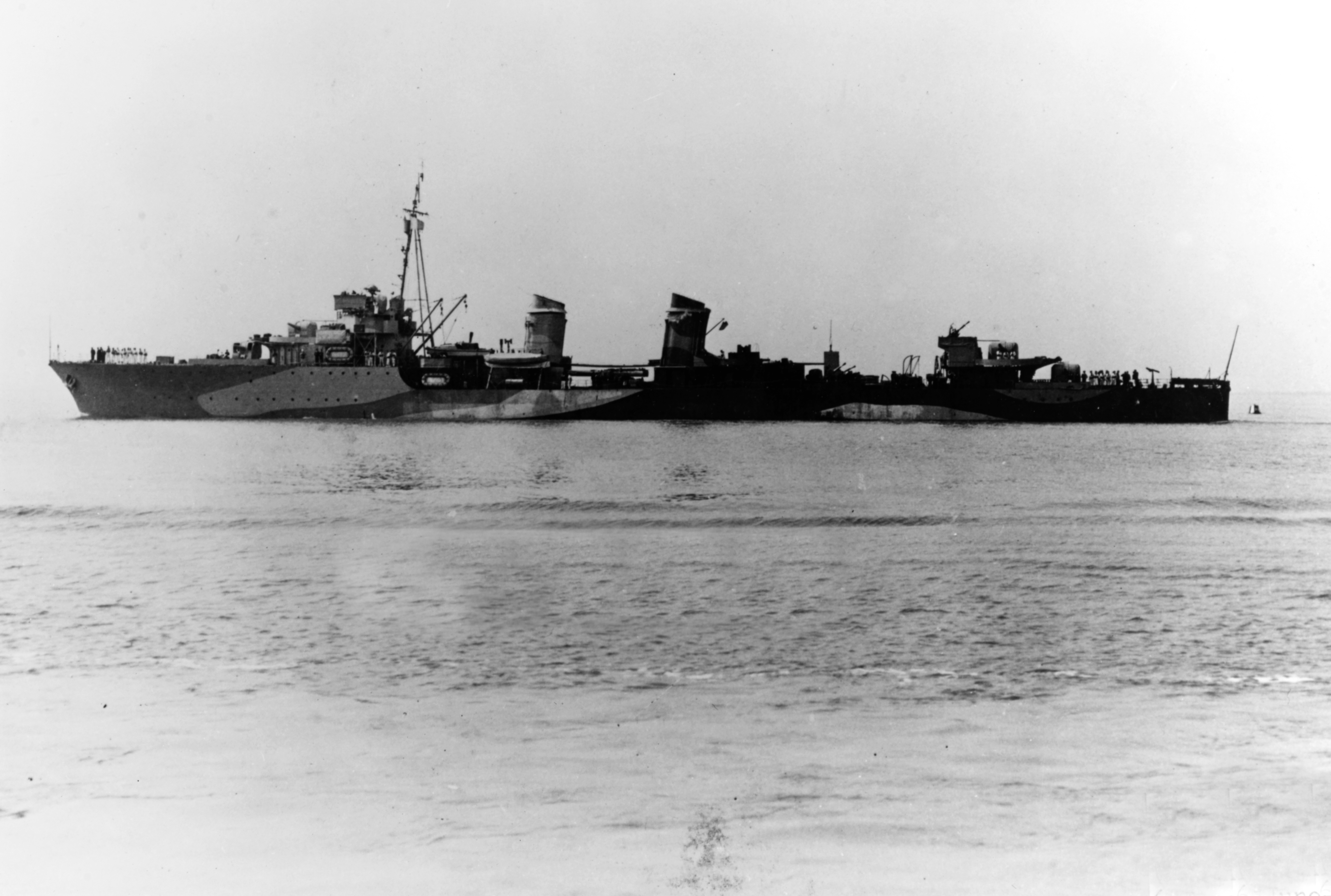
The Léopard, pictured in 1942

On the night of 26 to 27 November 1942, the FNFL large destroyer Léopard sailed with 74 troops from Mauritius, arriving off Saint-Denis on 27 at 23:00. She was captained by commander Jules Evenou, who went by the nom de guerre of "Jacques Richard".

Two launches were sent with a 5-man party to search for a favourable landing spot. At 2:30, Léopard was sighted by lookouts, as the invasion troops were boarding boats. About 60 men landed and, led by Lieutenant Moreau, took control of the government palace, and the rest of Saint-Denis was under Free France control by the evening. Barraquin, chief of the invasion troops, made contact with friendly elements in the population, notably Communist leader Léon de Lépervanche, and General secretary Rivière, who started arranging the hand-over of the island. Hard-core Vichyist Pillet then fled to Hell-Bourg to organise resistance. The new governor designated by De Gaulle, André Capagorry, arrived around 6 o'clock, cheered by the population, and gave a speech calling for calm on Radio Saint-Denis.

The next day, on 28 November, Communist cells under Lépervanche activated, seizing the Hôtel de Ville, arresting the mayor, and electing Lépervanche as leader of a "Committee of Public Safety". The communists then failed in an attempt to capture the 95-mm coastal battery of Le Port, commanded by Lieutenant Émile Hugot, considered a hard-core Pétainist. In retaliation, the battery opened fire on Léopard, which retreated to the open sea and started firing back, killing two. Engineer Raymond Decugis attempted to have the battery cease firing, but was killed by small arms fire. A sortie by the Vichyists was thwarted by small arms fire from the Resistance, severely wounding Hugot. Fearing an assault of their positions by regular troops, the gunners retreated, silencing the battery, and Léopard approached Le Port.

Upon learning that the invasion force was French rather than British, and without any response from his government in spite of repeated requests for instructions, Aubert renounced the idea of even a symbolic fight. However, Captain Evenou, growing increasingly nervous at the thought of enemy submarines and fearing for his ship, clumsily attempted to force the issue by threatening to destroy factories on the island. After lengthy negotiations involving Capagorry, Aubert eventually agreed to surrender on the condition that the ultimatum on the factories be made again as a way for him to save face. The surrender was formalised on 30 at 8:45.

Capagorry broadcast the statements:

Governor André Capagorry, governor of La Réunion, is pleased to inform the population that Governor Pierre Aubert has renounced pursuing a hopeless and fratricidal fight. Consequently, hostilities have ceased on the territory of the colony, and blood shall not be spilled any longer. Governor Pierre Aubert has done his duty with courage and correction and shall be given military honours. Now that the interest of France has prevailed, the whole population is encouraged to forget local quarrels and unite around the government of Fighting France to work at the liberation of the fatherland.

== Aftermath ==
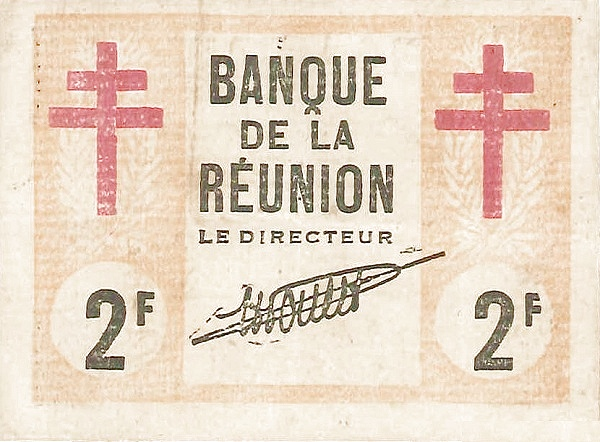
Banknote issued by Free French Réunion in 1943

On 2 December, Pillet, local army commander Artignan, and their wives were discreetly brought aboard Léopard as to avoid any popular retaliation. Aubert boarded the next day after lunch with Capagorry, Evenou and Barraquin, and the destroyer departed for Mauritius.

Léopard made several trips between Mauritius and La Réunion to provide rice, which had been lacking, contributing greatly to Capagorry's popularity. He gained the nickname papa de riz or the "rice daddy".

From 20 April 1943, a special court cancelled all sanctions and discharges imposed under the Vichy Regime. Officials of the Vichy administration suffered at most light penalties, except for Jean-Jacques Pillet, who was discharged. In recognition of his role in the battle, Raymond Decugis was later declared a Chevalier of the Legion of Honour and a Companion of the Liberation.

== See also ==
- French Somaliland in World War II
- History of Réunion
- Capture of Saint Pierre and Miquelon (December 1941)
