= Hugot =

Hugot (English: /hjuːˈɡoʊ/, French: [yɡo]) is a French surname. Notable people with the name include:

- Claude Hugot (1929–1978), French chess player
- Eugène Hugot (1819–1903), French playwright and chansonnier
- Émile Hugot (1904–1993), French sugar technologist
- Emmanuel Hugot (born 1981), French astrophysicist
