= Domenjod =

Coordinates: 20°54′47″S 55°30′24″E

Domenjod is a neighbourhood on the island of Réunion, located on its northern coast.

On the left bank of the Rivière des Pluies, it depends on the commune of Saint-Denis.
