= Alexandre Loupy =

French professor (born 1977)

- Born: 21 July 1977 (age 49); Saint Denis de la Réunion, France
- Awards: French National Academy of Medicine prize (2018), AST Clinical Science Investigator Award (2017)
- Scientific career
- Fields: Medicine, Nephrology, Transplantation, Epidemiology, Biostatistics
- Workplaces: Inserm; Necker-Enfants Malades Hospital; Paris Descartes University
- Academic advisors: Christophe Legendre

Alexandre Loupy (born 21 July 1977 in Saint-Denis de la Réunion) is a French nephrologist, a university professor and hospital practitioner at the Necker Hospital of the Assistance Publique - Hôpitaux de Paris, in the kidney transplant department. He is known for his discoveries on the topic of graft rejection.^{,}^{,} Its approach proposing innovative methodological tools has led to a better understanding but has also led to important changes in the international classification of graft rejection.^{,} These discoveries allow to improve the performance of clinical trials and to consider new therapeutic innovations in transplantation.

== Biography ==
Alexandre Loupy was born in Saint-Denis de la Réunion, France, on 21 July 1977. He is the son of Jack Loupy, company manager and travel agency director, and Françoise Loupy, pharmacist. He spent his entire schooling on Reunion Island before entering medical school in Bordeaux, France.

In 2002, he joined the Paris Hospitals and, in 2008, obtained his Diploma of Specialized Studies in Nephrology. In 2011, he obtained his PhD in Basic Sciences, and in 2014 obtained a PhD in Biostatistics.

Loupy defended a doctoral thesis in medicine in 2008. He also defended two academic theses: in cell biology on the "Role of Calcium/polycation-sensing receptor >> CaSR in the regulation of blood calcium levels independently of parathyroid hormone" at the Pierre and Marie Curie University under the supervision of Pascal Houillier in 2011, and in epidemiology on the "Prognostic role of anti-HLA antibodies in kidney transplantation: population-based approaches" at the Paris Descartes University under the direction of Xavier Jouven in 2014.

He is now a university professor and hospital practitioner at the Necker Hospital of the Assistance Publique - Hôpitaux de Paris, in the kidney transplant department.

== Scientific work ==
Alexandre Loupy's work has focused on allograft rejection and the relationship between the presence of antibodies and the progressive destruction of the graft. With the Paris Transplant Group, the Inserm research team which he established in 2017, he developed a population-based approach to organ transplantation using methodological tools based on classical statistical techniques but also on automated learning, machine learning and artificial intelligence.

With his research team, Loupy is developing an algorithm, called integrative Box or iBox, which predicts the short, medium and long term fate of the graft. This tool allows to finely characterize graft rejection by analyzing the expression of genes in the kidney, heart or lung graft.

More recently, his work has been extended to the optimization of organ allocation and their better use around the world. The results of his research led to recommendations for the use of organ from older donors for transplantation in the United States in 2019.^{,} He is also piloting large epidemiological studies on the consequences of the COVID-19 pandemic on organ transplantation in 12 countries. His team has also been mobilized to evaluate the methodological and scientific quality of the studies on COVID-19.

== Publications ==
Loupy is the author of many major publications including:

- "System for Predicting the Risk of Allograft Loss in Renal Transplant Patients: International Derivation and Validation Study" published in BMJ magazine in 2019.

He is also the lead author of numerous major publications in leading medical journals such as The New England Journal of Medicine, The Lancet, the JAMA, the BMJ, Annals of Internal Medicine, PLOS Medicine, Journal of Clinical Investigation, Circulation and Circulation Research. and more specialized peer-reviewed journals such as Kidney International, Journal of the American Society of Nephrology and American Journal of Transplantation.

His work is regularly featured in the French and international media such as L'Obs, CNN and NBC.

== Awards and honors ==
In 2018, Alexandre Loupy was rewarded by the French National Academy of Medicine for his work on kidney transplantation, anti-HLA graft rejection and the identification of associated biomarkers.

He is also a recipient of the American Society of Transplantation, the StrongTogether PRO Award, and the 2020 recipient of the Paul I. Terasaki Clinical Science Award., was established by the American Society for Histocompatibility and Immunogenetics in honour of Paul Terasaki.

The European Society of Transplantation designation his Paris Transplant Group as the most scientifically productive team in the transplantation field 4 years in a row.

He has been Associate Editor of the American Journal of Transplantation since 2017.

Loupy is an expert for the Food and Drug Administration and has been the Scientific Director of the International Classification of Rejection since 2015.^{,}
