= La Mare, Reunion =

La Mare
- Town
- Location in Réunion
- Coordinates: 20°53′49″S 55°31′54″E

Area
  - Total: 0.639 km^{2} (0.247 sq mi)

Population (2015)
  - Total: 2,189
  - Density: 3,430/km^{2} (8,870/sq mi)

La Mare is a small town in Réunion on the north coast. It lies to the east of the capital St-Denis.

== Transport ==
=== Rail ===
La Mare used to be served by a station of the former railway system.

In 2009, it was proposed to rebuild a railway system to cope with growing population and traffic congestion, albeit in a hybrid tram-train form, namely the Réunion Tram Train. La Mare is the northeastern terminus of the new network.
