= Émile Hugot =

French sugar engineer and author

Émile Hugo
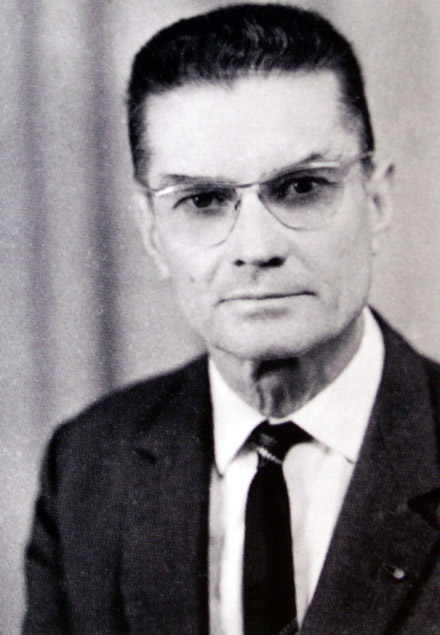
- Born: 9 June 1904; Saint-Denis
- Died: 7 August 1993 (aged 89); Saint-Denis
- Occupation: Sugar Engineer
- Known for: writing the Handbook of cane sugar engineering

Charles Paul Émile Hugot (pronounced [emil yɡo]; 1904–1993), known as Émile Hugot was a French sugar technologist, manager of sugar factories and he wrote the standard text on engineering in sugar factories.

== Early life and education ==
Hugot was born in Saint-Denis, Réunion in 1904 and died in the same city in 1993. Emile Hugot pursued his secondary education at the Leconte de Lisle High School (Collège Bourbon) and later at the Lycée Saint-Louis in Paris. He continued his studies at the Ecole Centrale des Arts et Manufactures in Paris in 1923, after gaining his engineering degree he did military service, training as a cadet officer at the artillery school in Poitiers, he became a lieutenant in the artillery in Blida, Algeria.

He returned to civilian life as a trainee chemist at the sugar factories on the French mainland at Artres and Bucy-le-Long before returning to Réunion in May 1928.

== Working life on Réunion ==
On Réunion he was engineer-surveyor to the Hydro-Electric Company of Reunion (SHER) from 1928 to 1929. At that time sugar factories were in need of energy, and so his objective was to capture the energy in the Rivière des Marsouins to produce 36,000 kWh.

He briefly joined his father's business offices, after which he became CEO of the Sugar Company Adam de Villiers (at La Mare) in 1932 and the Eperon Agricultural and Industrial Company (Société Agricole et Industrielle de l'Eperon).

== Military service ==
At the outbreak of World War II Hugot was mobilized as the artillery battery commander at Pointe des Galets fighting on the side of Vichy France. He was wounded in the Battle of Réunion and was transferred to England. In London, he was assigned to the General Staff of the Free French Forces and participated in the Alsace campaign before being sent to the front of the Alps. He was promoted to Captain on 25 September and discharged on 28 September 1945.

== Return to sugar ==
He returned to Réunion to devote himself to the sugar industry. He restructured the sugar industry of Réunion by amalgamating estates and factories of La Mare, Savanna and Grand Bois and the sugar estates of Convenance and Eperon and founded the Société des Sucreries de Bourbon, now simply known as Bourbon. He became the CEO of Bourbon Sugar from its inception in 1948 and he remained in that position until 1979. He amalgamated the factory and the estates of Stella in 1952. He was the founder of the Savanna Distillery.

He had six children with Mary Noëmie Renée Jeanne Reydellet.

== Commemoration ==
A school in Réunion has been named after him.

== Honors and Awards ==
- Officer of the Order of Legion of Honour
- Commander of the Ordre National du Mérite

== Publications ==
- Handbook of cane sugar engineering. Elsevier. 1972. ISBN 978-0-444-40896-9.
- L'usine et l'économie à La Réunion (in French). Cazal. 1961.

== See also ==
- fr:Émile Hugot
- fr:Distillerie de Savanna
- fr:Usine de Grands Bois
- fr:Bourbon (groupe)

== Notes and references ==
- Cheke, Anthony S.; Hume, Julian Pender (2008). Lost Land of the Dodo: An Ecological History of Mauritius, Réunion & Rodrigues. A&C Black. ISBN 978-0-300-14186-3.
- Jean-Daniel (12 December 2013). "Qui était Emile Hugot ?". Collège Emile Hugot (in French).
- Thirel, Sabine (28 November 2009). "Émile Hugot, l'empreinte d'un siècle". Zinfos 974, l'info de l'ile de La Réunion (in French).
