= Rivière des Pluies =

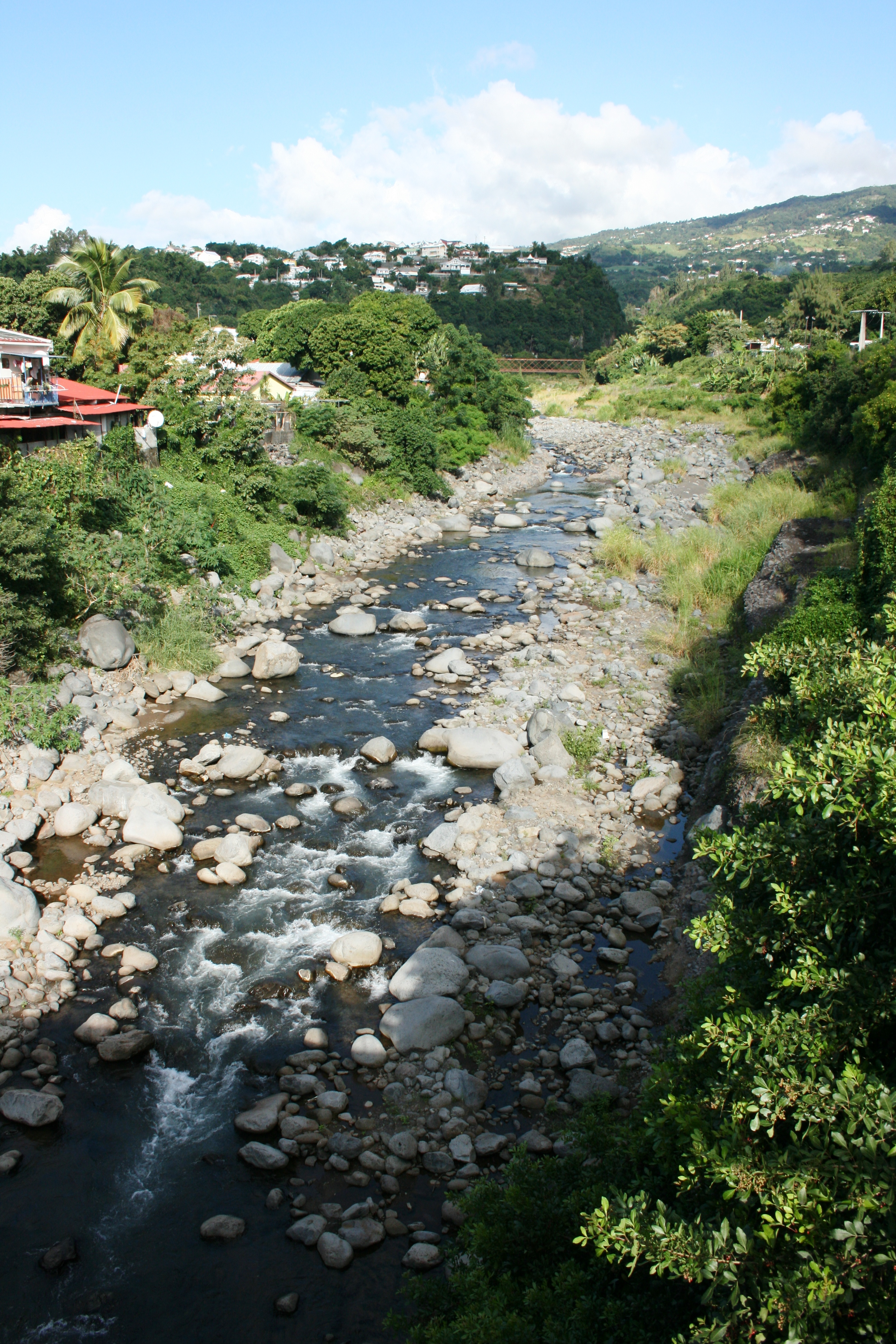
- Rivière-des-Pluies below the Desbassyns bridge

Location
- Country: France
- Region: Réunion

Physical characteristics
- Mouth: Indian Ocean
  - coordinates: 20°52′58″S 55°30′8″E
- Length: 18.5 km (11.5 mi)

The Rivière des Pluies (French pronunciation: [ʁivjɛʁ de plɥi], French for "river of the rains") is a river on the Indian Ocean island of Réunion. It flows to the sea on the island's northern shore, between the communes of Saint-Denis and Sainte-Marie. It is 18.5 km (11.5 mi) long.

It gives its name to a district of Sainte-Marie that overlooks the river and is inhabited by many people working in the capital.

== River crossings ==
Rivière des Pluies is crossed by five bridges, from upstream to downstream.

- A bridge carrying a water supply canal.
- Desbassyns bridge, a road bridge carrying the main road 45.
- The Pont Neuf, a road bridge carrying the highway 102.
- A road bridge on Route Nationale 6, the most recent.
- A road bridge on the highway 2.
