= Emmanuel Hugot =

French astrophysicist

Emmanuel H. Hugot
- Born: France
- Awards: SF2A Young Researcher Prize (2014) ERC starting grant (2015), CNRS Bronze Medal (2017), Merac early career award (2017)
- Scientific career
- Fields: Astrophysics
- Workplaces: Centre national de la recherche scientifique, Laboratoire d'astrophysique de Marseille

Emmanuel H. Hugot (pronounced [emanɥɛl yɡo]) is a French astrophysicist, deputy director at the Laboratoire d'Astrophysique de Marseille. known for his contribution to the developments of new technologies that help to improve telescopes used by professional astronomers around the world. This includes the development of more efficient curved detectors, but also improvements in the manufacturing methods for optical elements and active optics systems. The technologies developed by Hugot and his group are used on the SPHERE instrument mounted on the European Very Large Telescope, as well as the coronagraphic instrument of the future NASA's Nancy Grace Roman Space Telescope, which are used to detect exoplanets.

== Academic career ==
From 2015 to 2019, he was head of the R&D group in optics and instrumentation at the Laboratoire d'Astrophysique de Marseille, gathering about 30 persons. He obtained his PhD entitled “Astronomical Optics and elasticity theory” at the Aix Marseille University, France in 2007. He supervised or co-supervised 15 PhD students since 2009.

== Awards ==
- 2014 awarded the young researcher (“Jeune Chercheur”) prize by French Society of Astronomy & Astrophysics
- 2016 received a 2 million euros starting grant from the European Research Council for his project ICARUS.
- 2017 Hugot awarded the MERAC early career prize for new technologies by the European Astronomical Society for his unique and pioneering work on innovative astronomical instrumentation, based on active systems, freeform optics and curved focal planes.
- 2017 awarded a bronze medal by the French National Center for Scientific Research (French: Centre national de la recherche scientifique, CNRS)
- 2020, the French Academy of Technologies awarded him the Jean Jerphagnon Prize, awarding young researchers starting entrepreneurship in the field of photonics.
- in 2024 he received the Georges Lake Technology Innovation Award, awarded by the European Astronomical Society through the MERAC foundation for the innovative telescope CASTLE (Calar Alto SchmidT-Lemaitre Explorer).
