= Hôtel de Ville, Saint-Denis, Réunion =

Town hall in Saint-Denis, Réunion, France

Hôtel de Ville
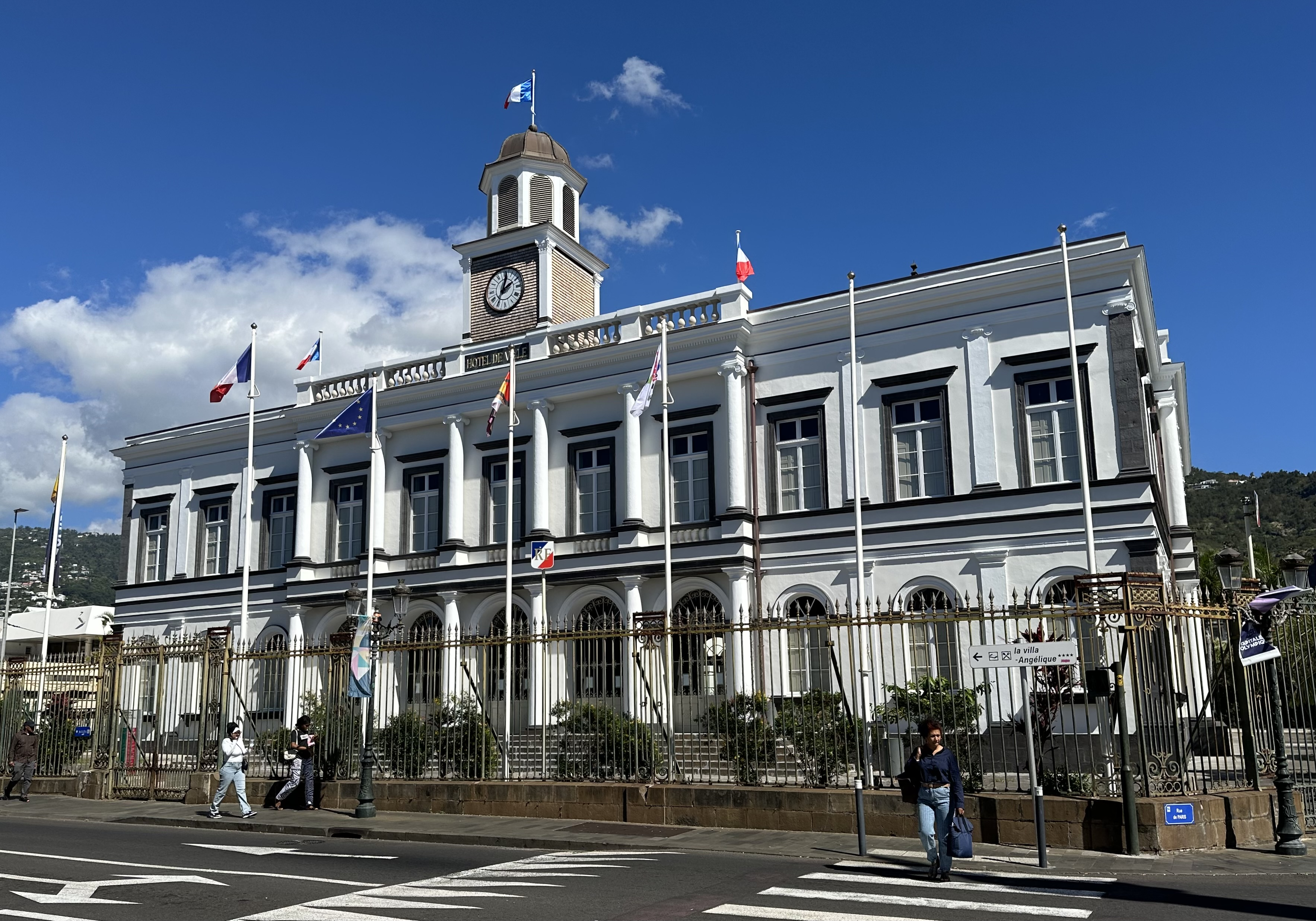
- The main frontage of the Hôtel de Ville in July 2024

General information
- Type: City hall
- Architectural style: Neoclassical style
- Location: Saint-Denis, Réunion, France
- Coordinates: 20.8788°S 55.4482°E
- Completed: 1846

Design and construction
- Architect: Pierre Georges Grenard

Monument historique
- Official name: Hôtel de ville
- Type: Inscrit
- Designated: 1975
- Reference no.: PA00105815

The Hôtel de Ville (French pronunciation: [otɛl də vil], City Hall) is a municipal building in Saint-Denis, Réunion, in the Indian Ocean, standing on Rue de Paris. It was designated a monument historique by the French government in 1975.

== History ==
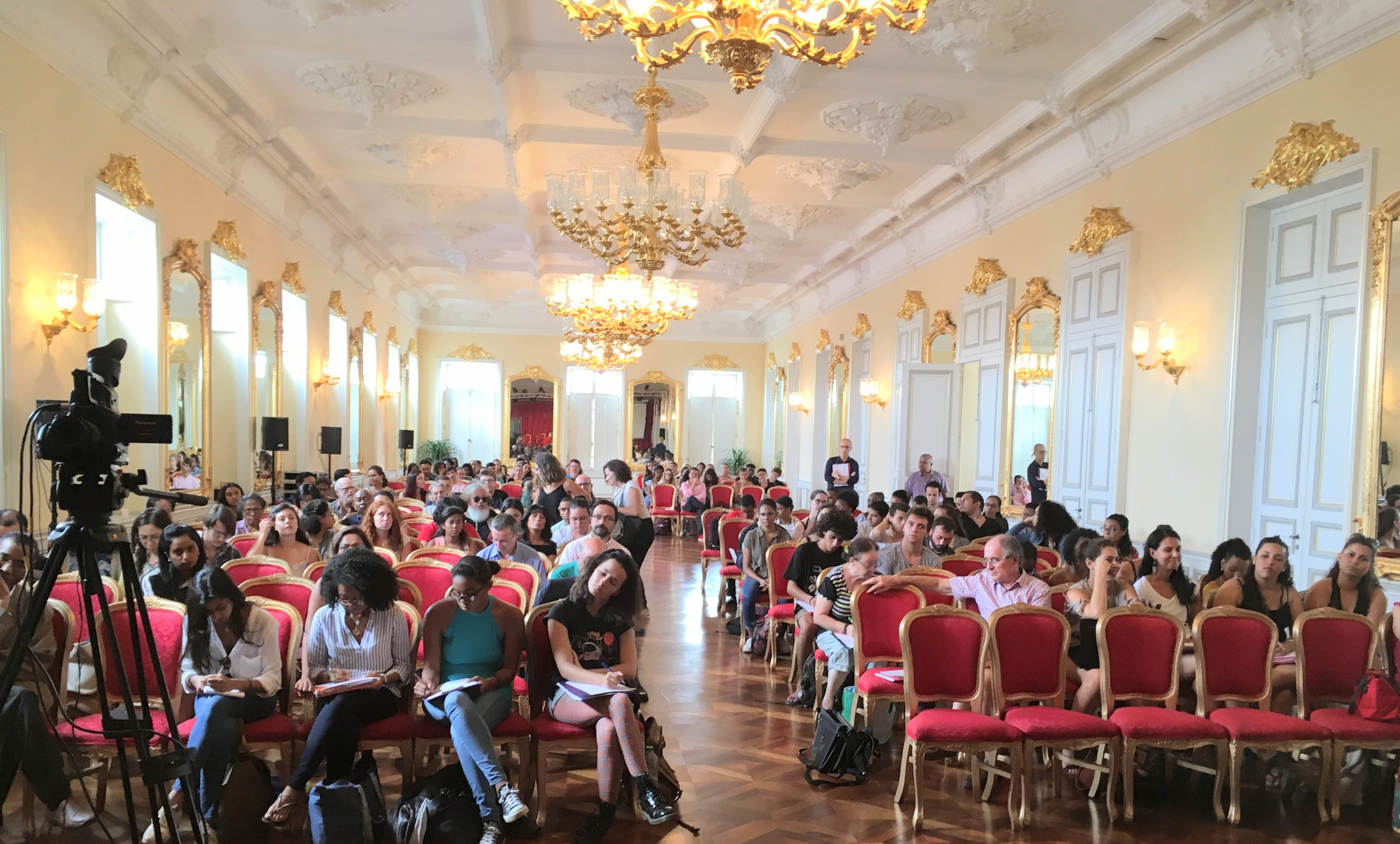
The Grand Salle des Fêtes

Following the French Revolution, the new town council was initially based at Place des Étuves (an area now occupied by the Halle du Grand Marché). The council relocated to a private house known as l'emplacement Azéma in 1838. However, in the early 1840s, the town council decided to commission a dedicated town hall. The site they selected was on the west side of Rue de Paris. Although the foundation stone was laid in 1846, progress was slow due to financial constraints. The building was designed by Pierre Georges Grenard in the neoclassical style, built in brick with a cement render finish and was officially opened by the Governor of Réunion, Émile Darricau, on 21 April 1860.

The design involved a symmetrical main frontage of 11 bays facing onto Rue de Paris. The central section of five bays, which was slightly projected forward, featured a short flight of steps leading up to five round headed openings separated by Doric order columns supporting an entablature; there were five tall casement windows with cornices on the first floor, separated by Ionic order columns supporting a cornice, a frieze, a modillioned cornice, and a balustraded parapet. The outer sections of three bays each were fenestrated with round headed windows on the ground floor, and with tall casement windows with cornices on the first floor: they were separated by Doric order pilasters on the ground floor and by Ionic order pilasters on the first floor. At roof level, there was a square tower with a clock in the first stage and an octagonal belfry, surmounted by a dome, above. Internally, the principal room was the Grand Salle des Fêtes (ballroom), which extended right across the front of the building on the first floor.

On 2 December 1868, following bitter disputes between anti-clerical and pro-Jesuit groups, a large crowd assembled in front of the town hall to demonstrate in favour of separation of the church and state, universal suffrage for the election of councillors and the release of prisoners. The mayor, Gibert des Molières, tried to calm tensions but when the crowd failed to disperse, French troops started shooting and using their bayonets: five people were killed and 22 were wounded (of whom another three died of their wounds). The next day the governor declared a state of emergency.

A war memorial, in the form of a column surmounted by a figure depicting Winged Victory, which was intended to commemorate the lives of local service personnel who had died in the First World War, was designed by Auguste Benard and erected on the street corner just to the northeast of the town hall. It was unveiled by the Governor of Réunion, Maurice Lapalud, on 23 December 1923. Following the liberation of Saint-Denis by 80 Free France troops from the destroyer Léopard on 28 November 1942, during the Second World War, the politician and trade unionist, Léon de Lépervanche, seized control of the town hall.
