= Léon de Lépervanche =

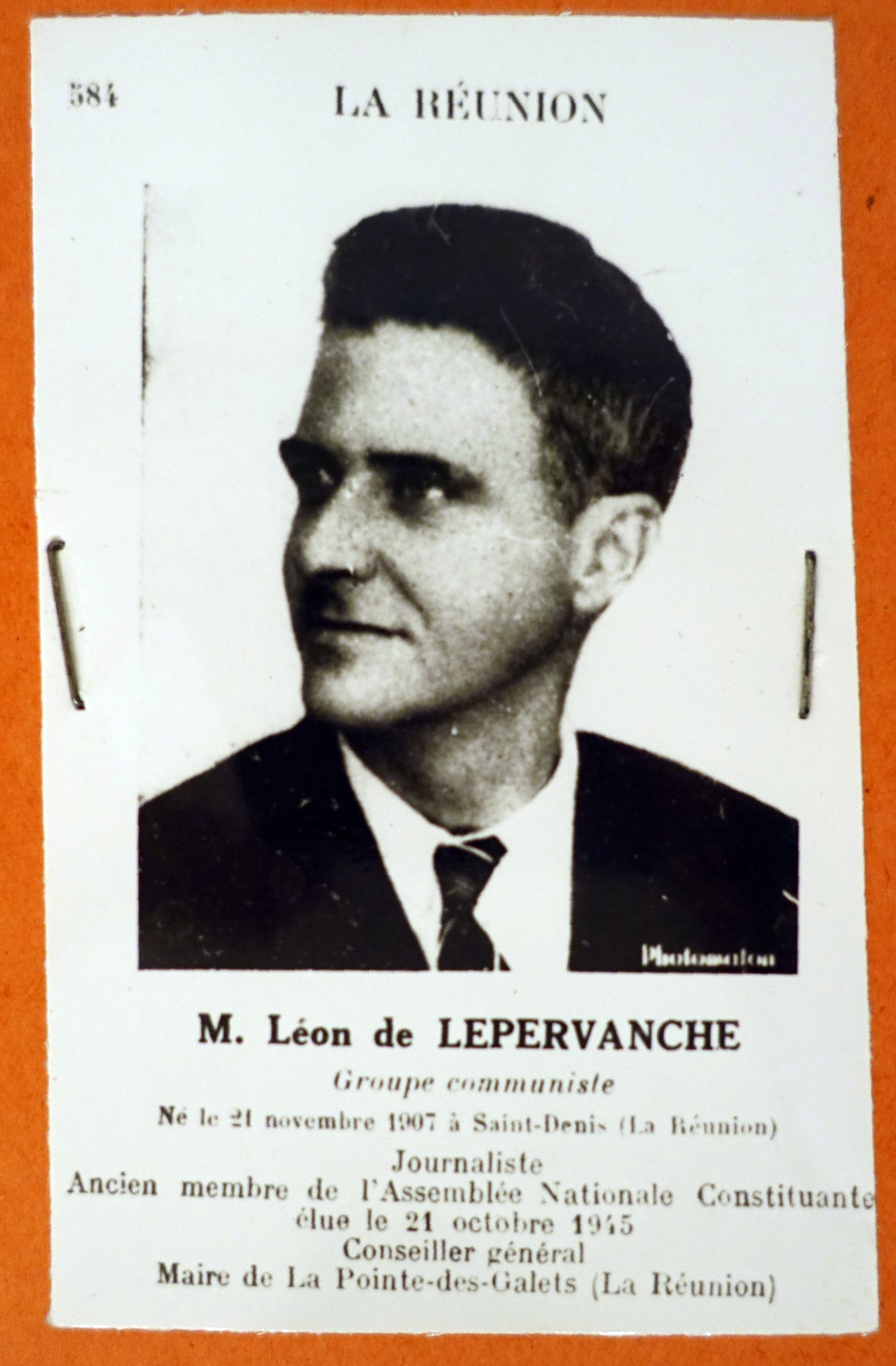
Léon de Lepervanche

Léon de Lépervanche (21 November 1907 – 14 November 1961) was a Reunionese communist politician, trade unionist and journalist who is known as one of the fathers of departmentalization of the Réunion island alongside Raymond Vergès.

== Biography ==
Lépervanche was born in to a mid-upper-class family, nevertheless held a modest position in the Port de La Réunion railways from 1923 and was one of the main trade union leaders on the island. As a chief postman, he was dismissed after the strikes of August 1938, then in 1940-1942 he was subjected to Petain's security checks for two years. His convictions led him in 1941 before the Special Criminal Court set up in Saint-Denis by the Vichy regime.

After his release, he organized support for the Free France Forces, and following the liberation of Saint-Denis by 80 French troops from the destroyer Léopard on 28 November 1942, he took possession of the Hôtel de Ville.

He was a founder of the newspaper Le Communiste in 1944 and its director until 1945, deputy from November 1946 to June 1951 alongside Raymond Vergès, he acted in concert with the latter, finding the support of the deputy of Martinique Aimé Césaire in favor of the "departmentalization" of the colonies of America and Reunion, adopted on March 19, 1946. His role earned him the title of "father of departmentalization".

He was mayor of the Port from 1945 until his death in 1961.
