= Saint-Denis, Réunion =

Prefecture, city and commune in Réunion, France

Saint-Denis Sin-Dni (Reunionese Creole)
- Prefecture and commune
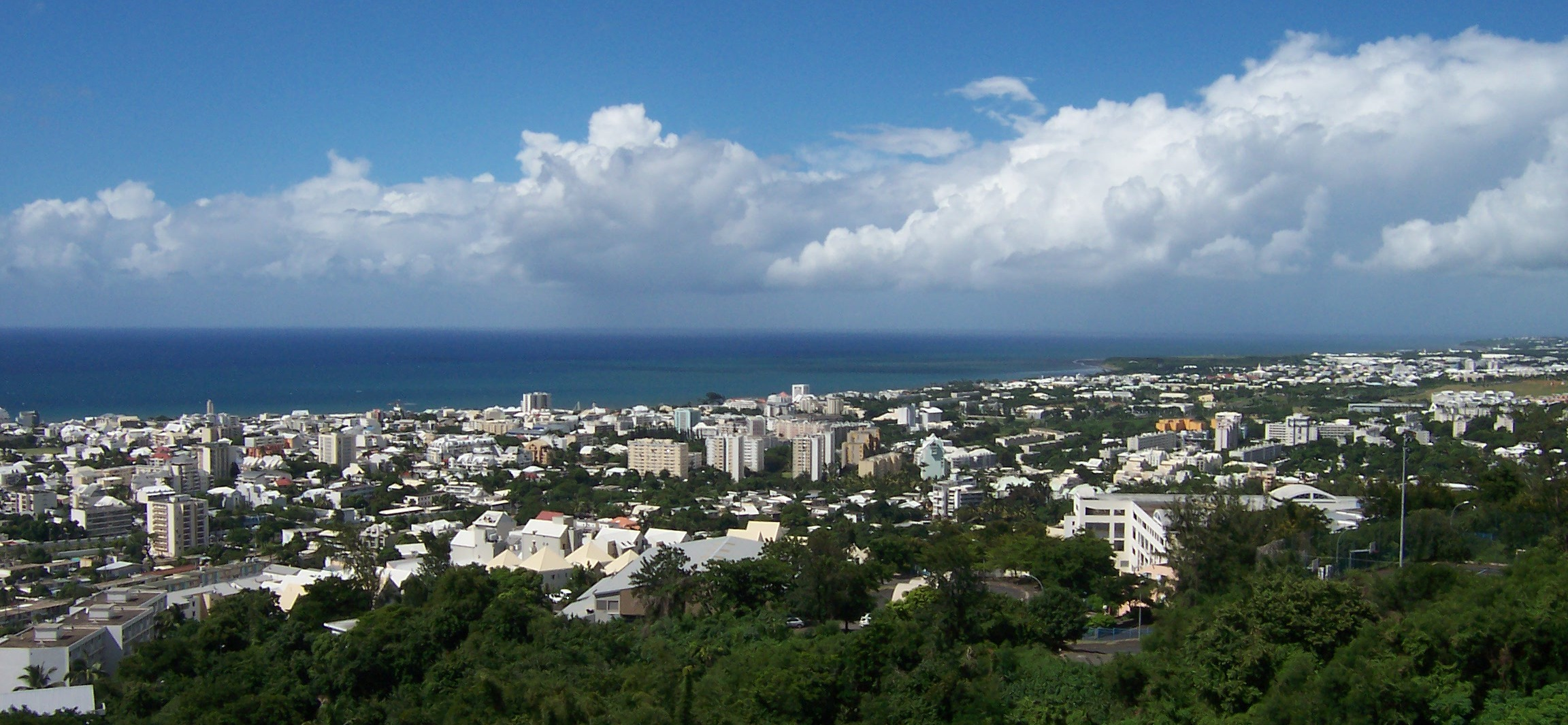
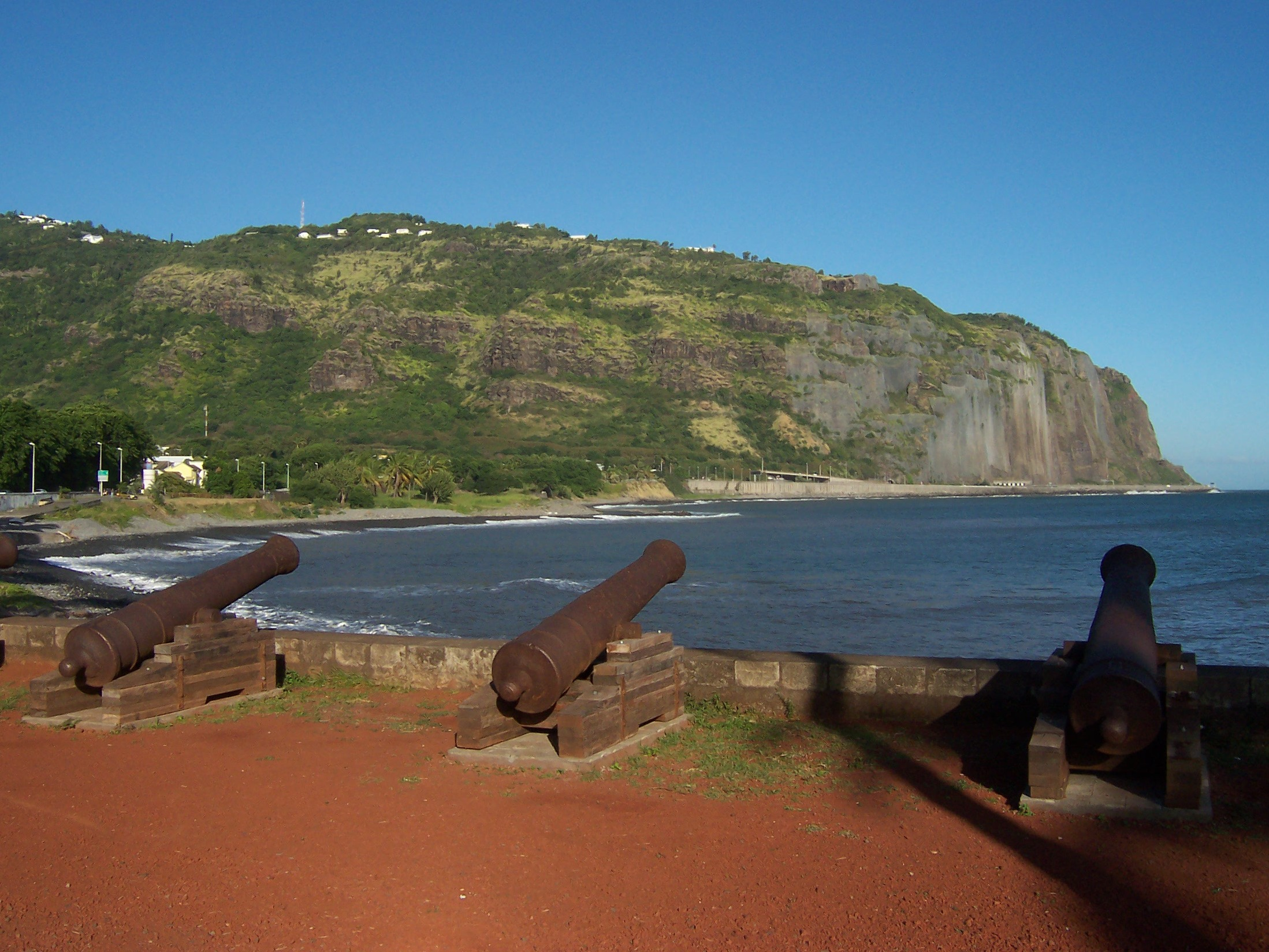
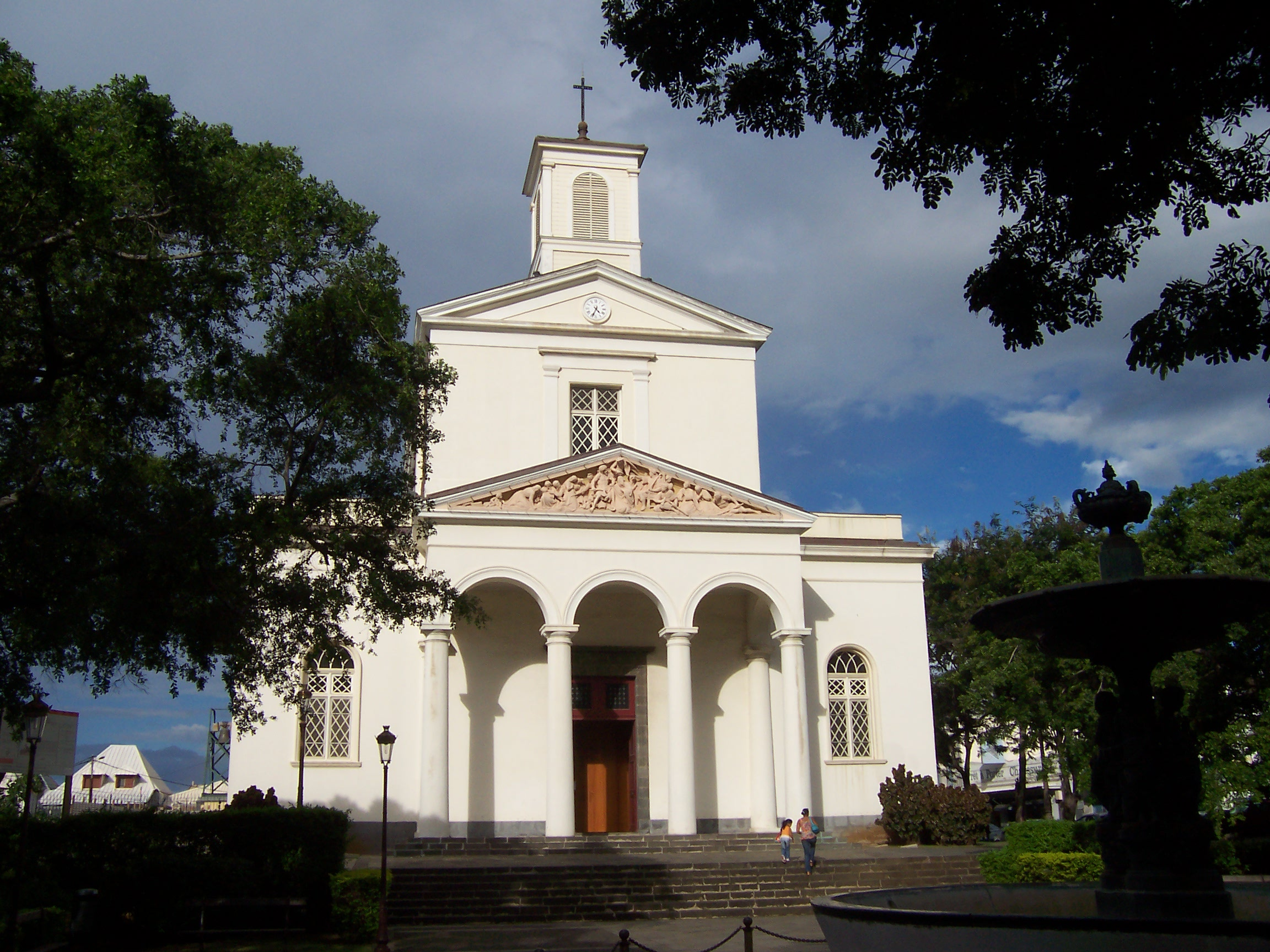
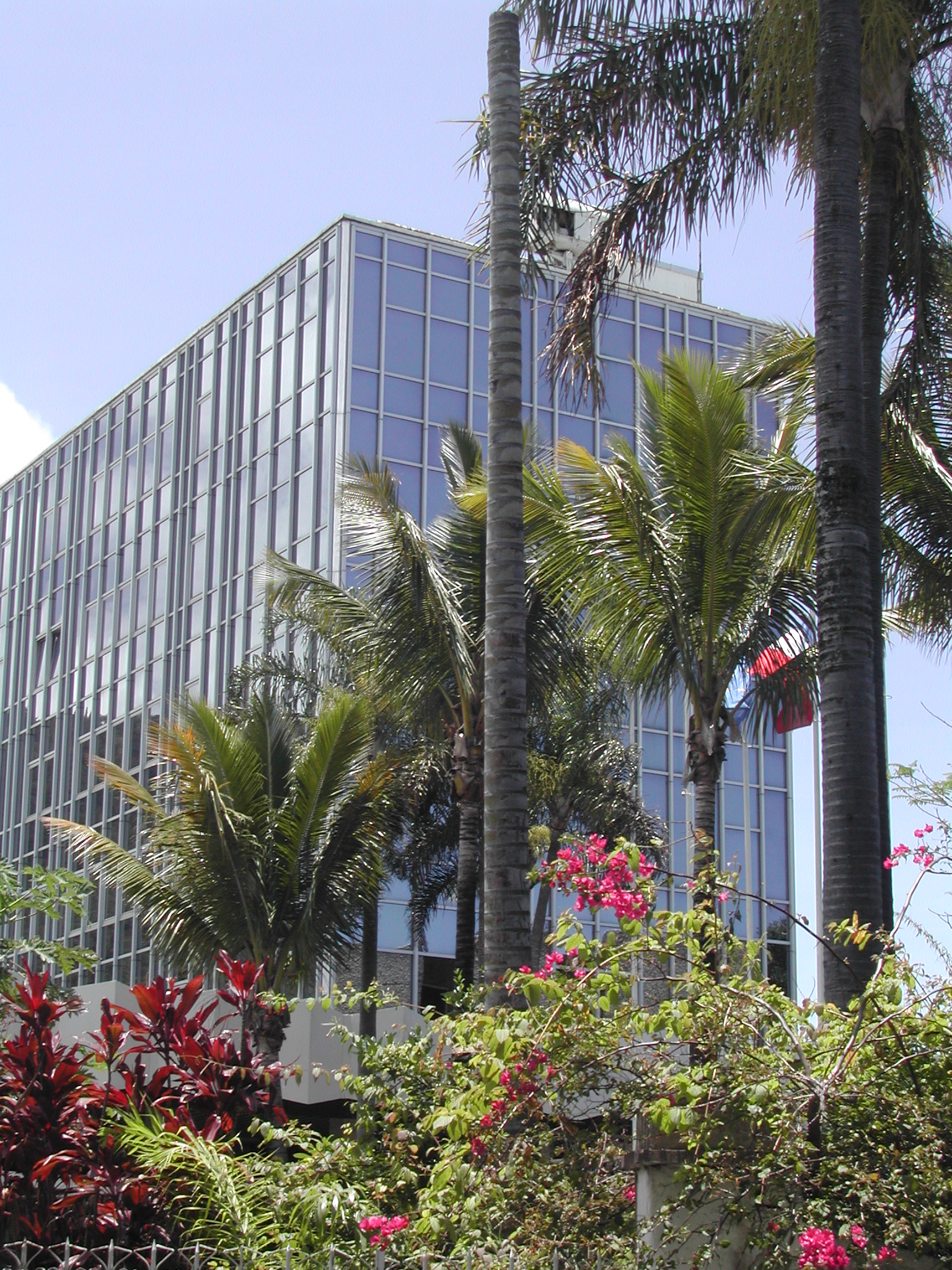
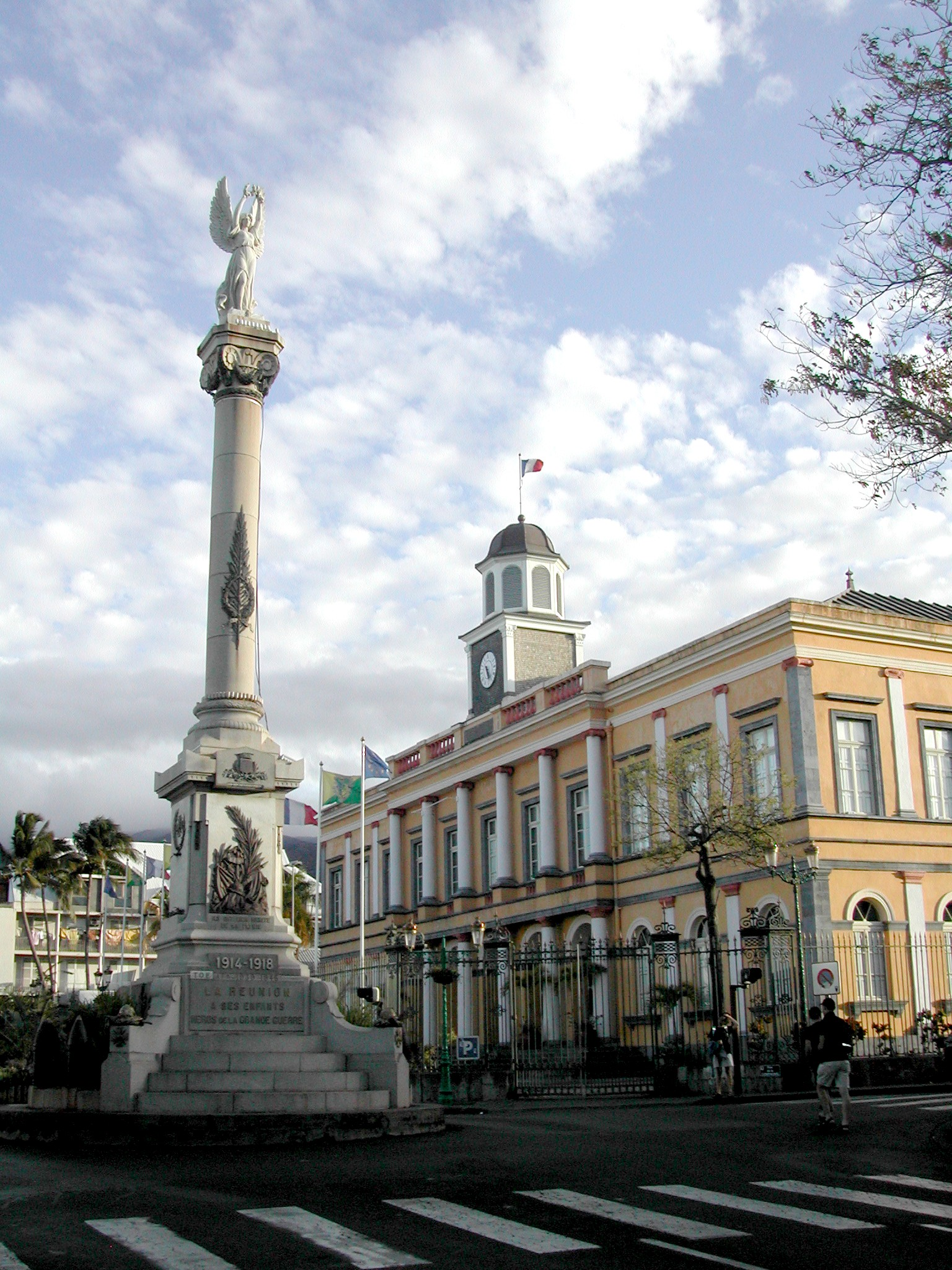
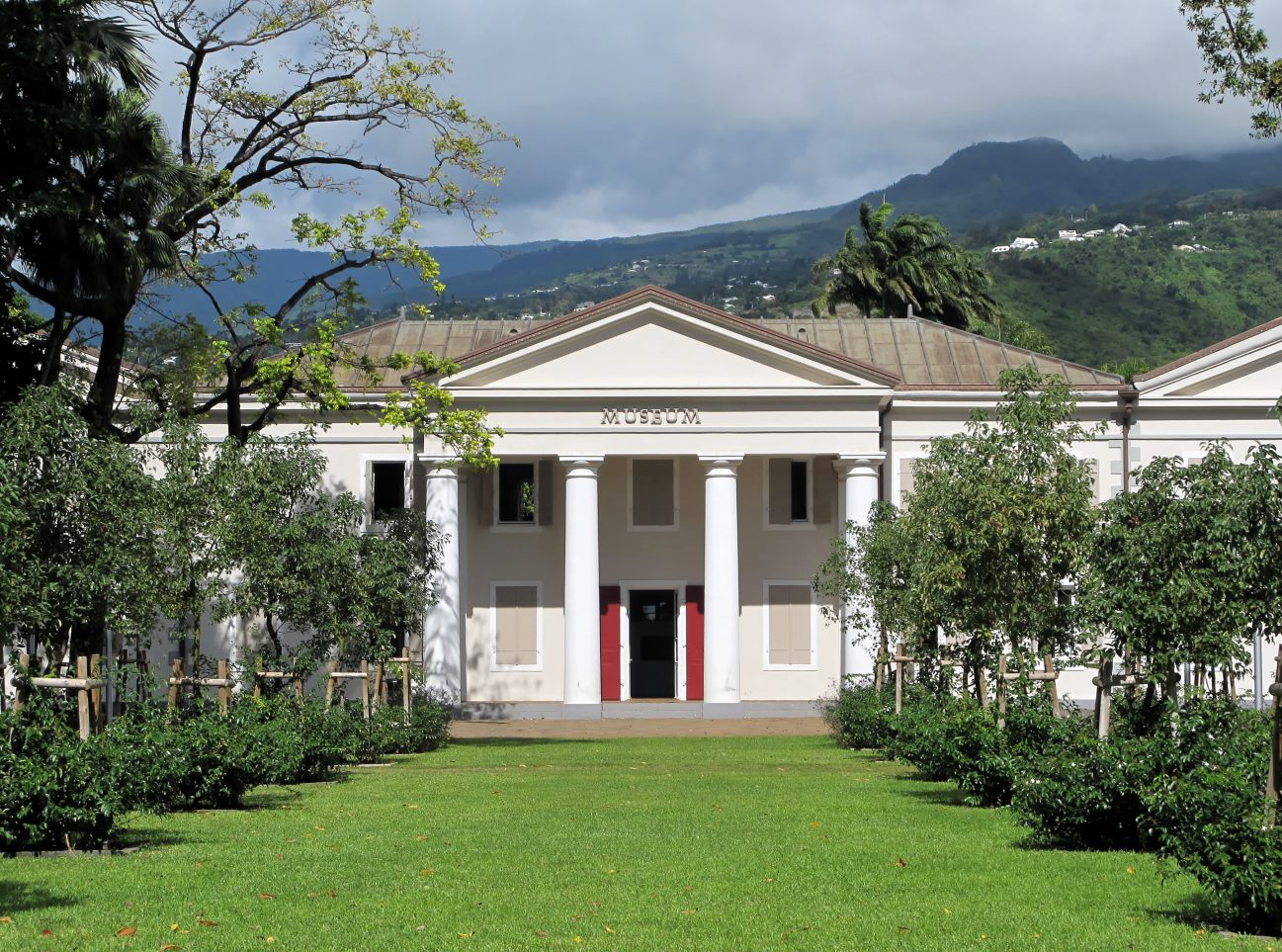
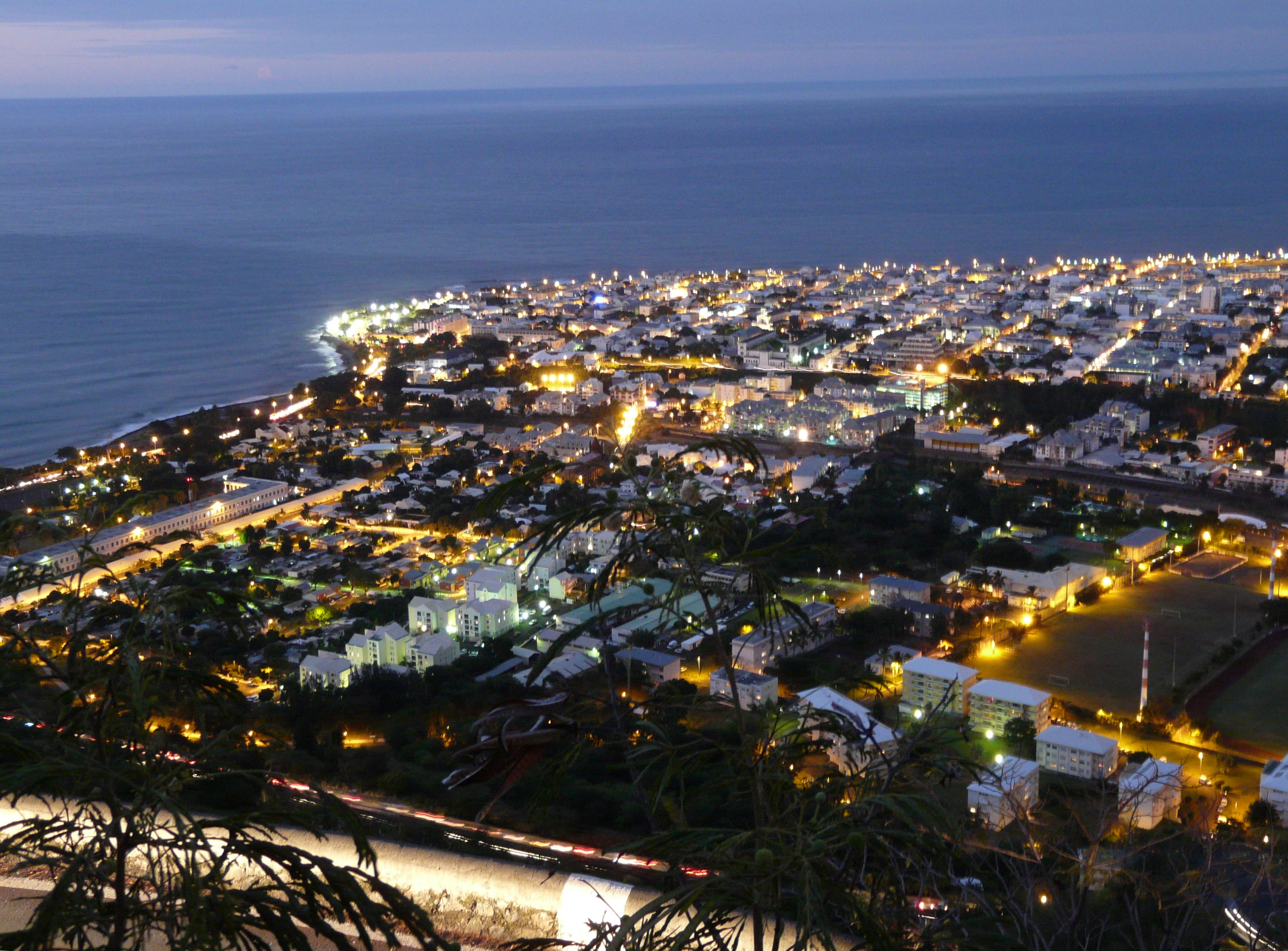
- From top, left to right: Panoramic view of the city from the heights of Bellepierre; cannons at the Barachois waterfront; Saint-Denis Cathedral; Palais de la Source, seat of the departmental council; Saint-Denis's historic Hôtel de Ville and Victory Column; La Réunion's Natural History Museum; city center and Indian Ocean in the evening.

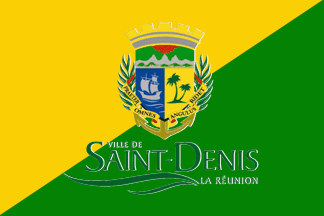
- Flag Coat of arms

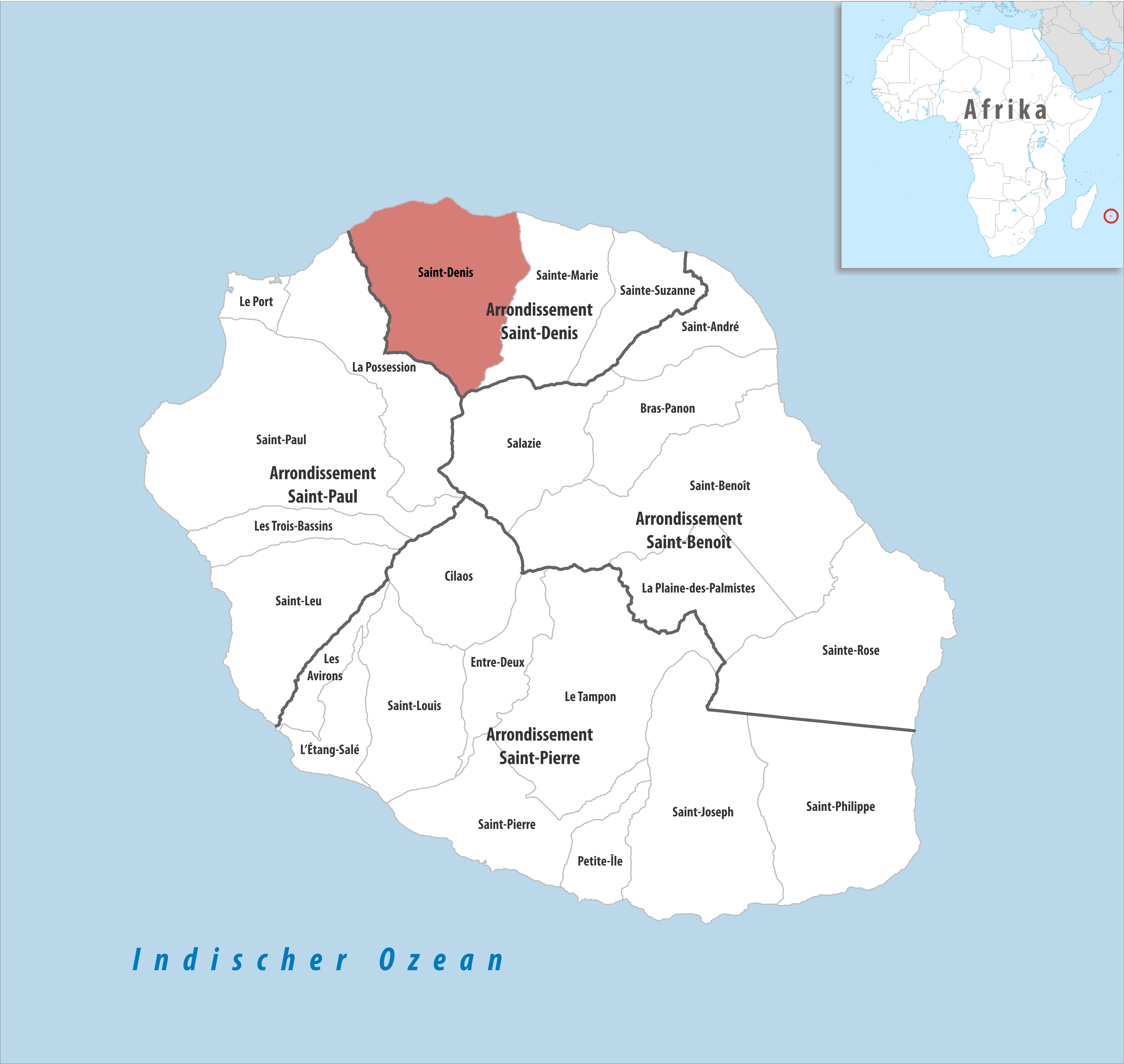
- Location of Saint-Denis
- Coordinates: 20°52′44″S 55°26′53″E
- Country: France
- Overseas region and department: Réunion
- Arrondissement: Saint-Denis
- Canton: 4 cantons
- Intercommunality: Nord de la Réunion

Government
  - Mayor (2020–2026): Ericka Bareigts (PS)
- Area^{1}: 142.79 km^{2} (55.13 sq mi)
  - Metro (2020): 547.8 km^{2} (211.5 sq mi)
- Elevation: 23 m (75 ft)
- Highest elevation: 2,276 m (7,467 ft)
- Lowest elevation: 0 m (0 ft)
- Population (2023): 155,634
  - Density: 1,090.0/km^{2} (2,823.0/sq mi)
  - Metro (Jan. 2023): 326,743
  - Metro density: 596.5/km^{2} (1,545/sq mi)
- Time zone: UTC+04:00
- INSEE/Postal code: 97411 /97400
- Website: www.saintdenis.re
- ^{1} French Land Register data, which excludes lakes, ponds, glaciers > 1 km^{2} (0.386 sq mi or 247 acres) and river estuaries.

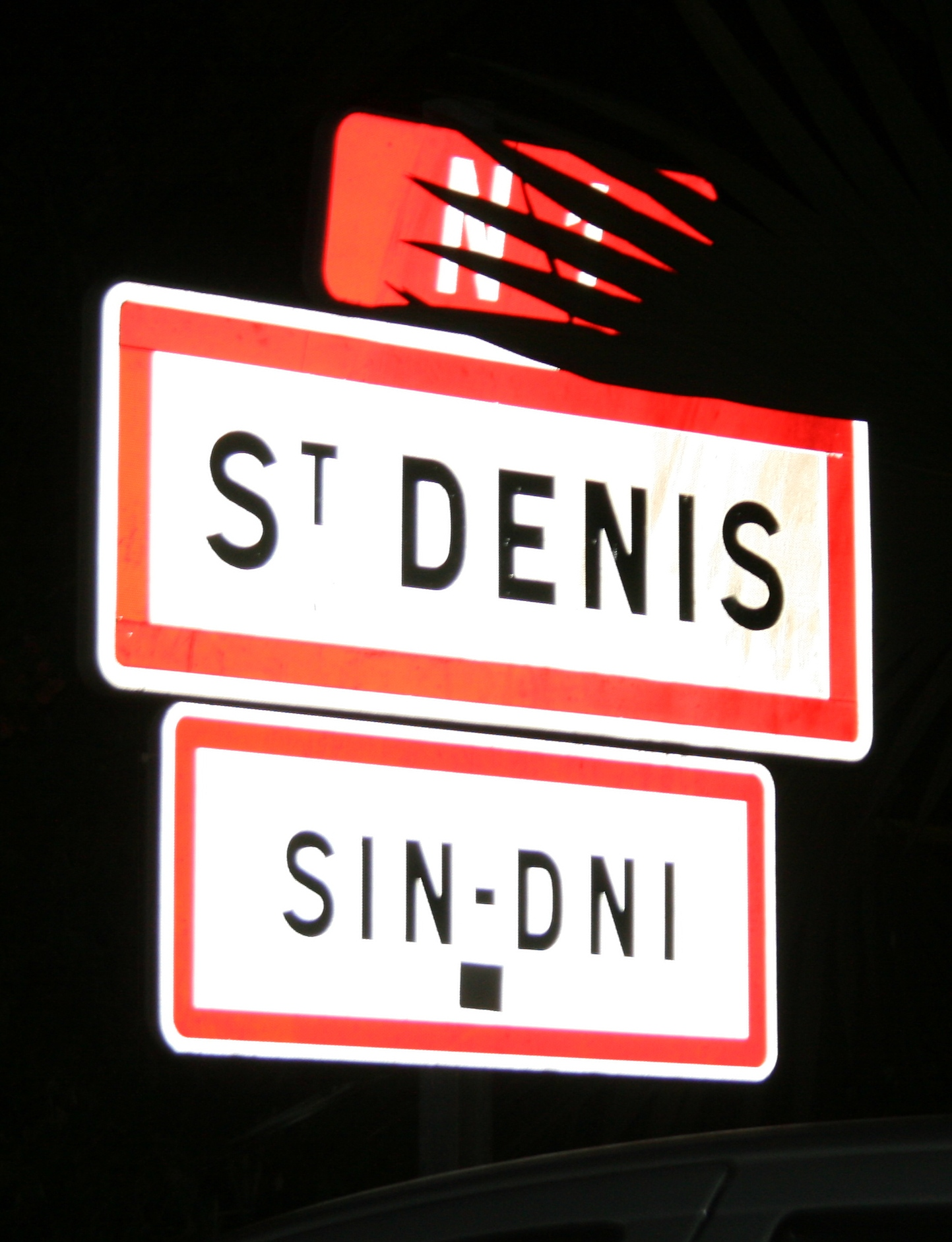
Bilingual sign in French and Reunionese Creole

Saint-Denis (/ˌsæ̃dəˈniː/; French: [sɛ̃ d(ə)ni]; Reunionese Creole: Sin-Dni), unofficially Saint-Denis de La Réunion (pronounced [sɛ̃ d(ə)ni də la ʁeynjɔ̃]) for disambiguation, is the prefecture (administrative capital) of the French overseas department and region of Réunion, in the Indian Ocean. It is located at the island's northernmost point, close to the mouth of the Rivière Saint-Denis.

Saint-Denis is the most populous commune in the French overseas departments and the twentieth most populous in all of France. At the 2023 census, there were 326,743 inhabitants in the metropolitan area of Saint-Denis (as defined by INSEE), 155,634 of whom lived in the city (commune) of Saint-Denis proper and the remainder in the neighbouring communes of La Possession, Sainte-Marie, Sainte-Suzanne, Saint-André, and Bras-Panon.

== History ==
=== Foundation ===
Saint-Denis was founded in 1669 by Étienne Regnault, the first governor of Bourbon Island (as La Réunion was then called), on the northern side of the island, where a larger and more fertile plain was deemed more propitious for the development of settlements than the drier and more barren area of Saint-Paul on the western side of the island. Saint-Paul had been the site of Bourbon Island's first French settlement in 1663 due to the better anchorage and wind conditions of the western coast.

The new settlement was named Saint-Denis after the name of a ship owned by one of governor Regnault's friends, which had landed in Réunion in 1668. Saint-Denis and Saint-Paul shared the role of colonial capital of Bourbon for some years, with the governor and colonial council staying alternatively in the two settlements, until Saint-Denis was chosen as the permanent location of Bourbon's colonial government in 1738.

=== 18th century and Napoleonic Wars ===
Soon after 1738, work was started to establish a seaport in the little bay of Le Barachois, on the eastern side of the Saint-Denis River, to replace the port of Saint-Paul, but its site did not offer a safe haven, due to unpredictable winds and tides, as well as frequent high surf which forced ships to unload their cargo in the open roadstead away from the shore, from where it was carried to the shore with the use of a mobile pier. Improvements in the 19th century resulted in the construction of a small artificial harbor where surf boats in charge of unloading cargo from larger ships could be protected from winds and swells, but it was regularly damaged by cyclones. Eventually it was replaced by a new and much larger artificial harbor built on the northwest coast of La Réunion in the 1880s, in today's commune of Le Port, 15 kilometres (9.3 mi) from Saint-Denis.

A royal decree in 1766 divided Bourbon Island in 5 quartiers, one of which was Saint-Denis. The checkerboard plan of the city, established by land surveyor Jean-Baptiste Bancks (sometimes spelled Banck, of Irish Jacobite descent), was officially adopted in 1777. In 1790, Saint-Denis became a commune. Its first mayor was Jean-Baptiste Delestrac.

During the Napoleonic Wars, Saint-Denis was captured by British troops on 8 July 1810. The British occupied Saint-Denis and the entire island during nearly 5 years. On 6 April 1815, after the Treaty of Paris, the British officially restored Bourbon Island to France during a ceremony held on the main square of Saint-Denis. Later in October 1815, as news of Napoleon's return to France had arrived in the Indian Ocean, a British fleet from Mauritius presented itself in front of St Denis, asking the French governor of Bourbon Island to surrender the colony to His Britannic Majesty. The French governor refused and the British started a blockade of the island. Eventually on 28 October the news arrived of Napoleon's 2nd abdication and Louis XVIII's return to power, and the British fleet ended its blockade.

=== Prosperity and urban development (1815–1860s) ===
In the 18th century, cultivation of coffee had ensured the development of Saint-Denis. Warehouses in Saint-Denis stored the coffee beans before their export to Europe from the port of Saint-Denis. In the 19th century, following France's loss of its largest sugar colonies of Saint-Domingue (Haiti) and the Isle of France (Mauritius) as a result of the French Revolution and Napoleonic Wars, sugarcane replaced coffee as the main crop in Bourbon, and sugar became the main export, again ensuring the development of Saint-Denis, from where sugar was exported to Europe.

The prosperous period experienced by Saint-Denis after the Napoleonic Wars was marked by urban development and public investments. In 1818, due to the British annexation of the Isle of France (Mauritius) which was home to the only lycée in the Mascarene Islands, where Bourbon Island's elites used to send their children for secondary education, Bourbon Island's governor Milius launched the construction of a royal college in Saint-Denis (Collège de Bourbon), which opened in 1819, the first royal college on Bourbon Island (later renamed Lycée de La Réunion in 1848, then transformed into a collège, i.e. middle school, in 1968). In 1825 a law school (École de Jurisprudence) granting the Bachelor of Laws was established in Saint-Denis.

Construction of the Saint-Denis Cathedral was begun in 1829 and completed in 1832. The theatre of Saint-Denis was built in 1835 with loggias and balconies (it was later destroyed by fire in 1919). That same year, construction of the Palais législatif ("Legislative Palace") was begun and completed in 1837: the palace housed the Colonial Council (Conseil colonial), the legislative assembly of Bourbon Island; the palace was later turned over in 1855 to the newly created Natural History Museum of La Réunion, the first natural history museum in the Indian Ocean. In 1843, following the example of Mauritius where horse races had become popular among French colonial planters, a racecourse was inaugurated at La Redoute, now transformed into a stadium. Construction of the Hôtel de Ville was started in 1846 and the building was inaugurated in 1860. The central market of Saint-Denis, a wrought iron structure, was built between 1864 and 1866.

The first cholera pandemic struck Saint-Denis in the beginning of 1820: cholera had arrived from Calcutta in Mauritius the year before, and despite strict orders from governor Milius forbidding any contact with Mauritius, one ship arriving from Mauritius evaded the orders and brought cholera to Saint-Denis. The authorities reacted quickly as soon as the disease was discovered in town by isolating sick people, establishing a military cordon sanitaire, and evacuating the rest of the population from the city. As a result, cholera was contained within the city limits and killed only 178 people (whereas it spread all over Mauritius and killed thousands of people there).

In 1841, the famous poet Charles Baudelaire, then 20 year-old, who had been sent on a voyage to Calcutta, India by his family in the hope of ending his dissolute habits, landed in Saint-Denis and stayed on Bourbon Island for 45 days, before deciding to return to metropolitan France without reaching India.

In 1847, the return to Bourbon Island of the Catholic Apostolic Vice-Prefect of the island, Alexandre Monnet, an abolitionist who had worked for the evangelization of Bourbon's Black slaves and was returning from a trip to Europe where he had been celebrated in Paris and Rome for his work in favor of Black slaves, triggered two days of protests in Saint-Denis among the White colonists, who insulted the Apostolic Vice-Prefect without governor Joseph Graëb intervening to stop the turmoil. Due to strong opposition, and without any local support, Father Monnet, nicknamed the Father of Black People (le Père des Noirs), was forced to leave Bourbon Island only fifteen days later at the urging of the governor.

On 9 June 1848, after the arrival of news of the February 1848 French Revolution from Europe, governor Graëb announced the proclamation of the French Republic in Saint-Denis, and the island's name was changed to La Réunion, the name it had already held between 1793 and 1806. The establishment of the Republic was met with coldness and distrust by the wealthy White planters due to the professed abolitionism of the new Republican authorities in Paris. On 18 October 1848 the new Commissioner of the Republic, Sarda Garriga, sent from Paris to replace governor Graëb, announced in Saint-Denis the abolition of slavery in Réunion Island, effective on 20 December 1848. In December the students at the lycée of Saint-Denis, sons of rich planters, demonstrated against the director of the lycée, a declared republican. Unable to calm the protestors, commissioner Sarda Garriga was forced to call in the troops and close the lycée for more than a month.

In 1853, the Banque de La Réunion was founded in Saint-Denis with part of the compensation paid to Réunion's slave owners by the French government after the 1848 abolition of slavery. It was the first commercial bank in Réunion, and also served as a central bank, with the legal right to issue banknotes. The next year a savings bank was also established in Saint-Denis.

=== Stagnation (1860s–1940s) ===
Saint-Denis was struck by the third cholera pandemic in 1859, the first time cholera was returning to Réunion since 1820. During the outbreaks of cholera in Mauritius in 1854 and 1856, strict sanitary measures forbidding the landing of ships in Réunion had prevented the disease from reaching the island. In 1859, however, a ship transporting indentured laborers from East Africa hid the cases of cholera on board from the Saint-Denis authorities and the ship was allowed to land. Cholera spread quickly and killed 863 people in the city (and 2,200 people in the entire island) in the space of two months and a half, one of the deadliest epidemics in the history of Réunion.

In the 1860s, cane cultivation was affected by the Chilo sacchariphagus pest, and the recruiting of labourers in India also became more difficult (caps introduced by British authorities), which led to a crisis of Réunion's sugar cane industry. During the same period, the island was hit by several cyclones. Malaria also arrived in Réunion in 1868, three years after its arrival in Mauritius (both islands were malaria-free before the 1860s), and the disease became endemic in the island. The opening of the Suez Canal in 1869 as well as the French growing interest in colonizing Madagascar also marginalized Réunion. As a result of all these events, Saint-Denis entered a period of stagnation that lasted until World War II. The city even officially experienced population decline from the 1870s until the beginning of the 1920s, before recovering slightly after 1921 (see Demographics section).

In 1868, bitter press campaigns opposing local liberal (anti-clerical) and clerical (pro-Jesuit) newspapers degenerated when the editor-in-chief of the clerical newspaper La Malle was rumored to have sexually assaulted the son of a merchant from Saint-Denis. The rumor led to five days of anti-clerical riots in the city in November–December 1868, with crowds of up to 2,000 gathering in front of the bishop's palace, shouting "Down with La Malle! Down with the Jesuits!", and ransacking the college (high school) of the Jesuits. On 3 December governor Marie Jules Dupré ordered the dispersal of the unarmed anti-clerical crowd assembled on the square in front of the Saint-Denis Hôtel de Ville, and the troops opened fire, killing 9 people and injuring another 30 people. The next day, a state of siege was declared. The tragedy had nationwide repercussions in France in the dying days of the Second French Empire which opposed liberals and conservatives.

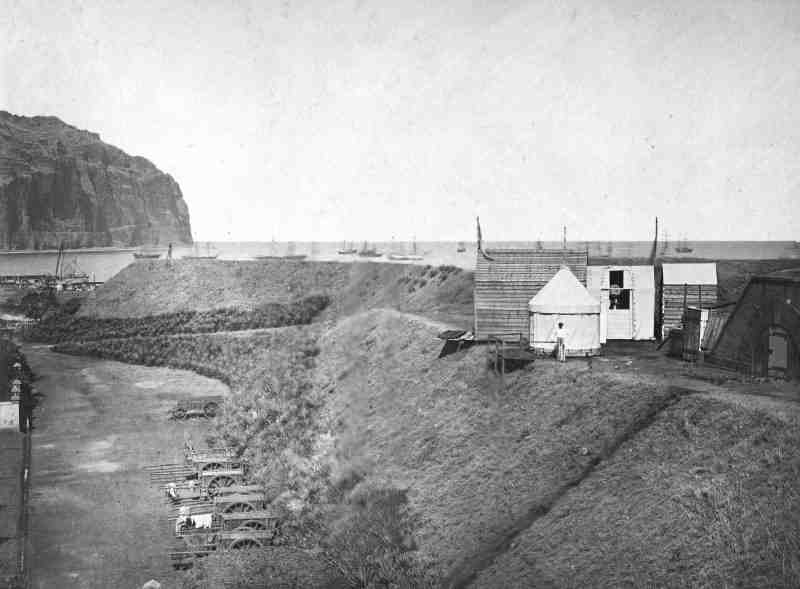
Dutch camp set up at the Barachois seafront by the Oudemans mission for the 1874 transit of Venus.

On 3 November 1870, after ships had brought the news of Napoleon III's fall and proclamation of the French Republic in Paris, governor Louis Hippolyte de Lormel announced the proclamation of the French Republic in Saint-Denis. That same year, the first telegraph line in Réunion was established between Saint-Denis and the southern Réunionese subprefecture of Saint-Pierre, 110 kilometres (68 mi) in length.

In December 1874, the Oudemans scientific mission sent by king William III of the Netherlands to Réunion to observe the transit of Venus established its observation camp at the seafront of Barachois, in Saint-Denis.

A 10.5 kilometres (6.5 mi) railway tunnel dug in the big lava flow separating Saint-Denis from La Possession was started in 1878 and completed in 1881, allowing trains to connect Saint-Denis with the new seaport of La Réunion under construction at Le Port in replacement of the old harbor of Barachois in Saint-Denis. It was the third-longest tunnel in the world at the time.

In 1891, the first streets in the centre of Saint-Denis started to be lit with electric lighting. In 1896, the first public screening with a movie projector of the Lumière brothers brought from Paris took place in the Saint-Denis city hall. In 1900 the first automobile arrived in Saint-Denis, a Peugeot car.

In 1896, the first Chinese temple in Réunion and in France was opened in Saint-Denis, the Chane temple (陈宅), also called Shichantang (世昌堂), dedicated to Guandi and to the ancestral worship of the Chane (陈) family, one of the Cantonese families arrived in Réunion in the 1860s and 1870s as Chinese labourers. In 1905 was inaugurated in Saint-Denis the Noor-e-Islam Mosque, the oldest mosque in France (outside of Mayotte), whose construction was authorized by the governor of Réunion in 1898 after several requests from the Muslim inhabitants of the island, Indians originally from Gujarat arrived in Réunion in the 1850s. The first Hindu temple in Saint-Denis, the Tamil Kalikambal Temple, was inaugurated in 1917.

In 1897, queen Ranavalona III of Madagascar was deported to Saint-Denis, where she lived for two years before being deported to French Algeria. Sultan Said Ali bin Said Omar of Grande Comore was also exiled to Réunion where he lived in Saint-Denis in the end of the 1890s and beginning of the 1900s. The deposed emperor of Vietnam Thành Thái and his son the emperor Duy Tân were both exiled to Réunion by French authorities in 1916 and they lived in Saint-Denis until World War II. The Moroccan rebel leader Abd el-Krim, founder of the Republic of the Rif, was also exiled to Réunion in 1926 after his surrender to French troops, and he lived in Saint-Denis until 1929, before moving to Les Trois-Bassins.

In 1912, the Musée Léon-Dierx, the museum of arts of Saint-Denis, was inaugurated in the colonial mansion which served as the bishop's palace and had been seized by the French state the year before, following the 1905 French law on the Separation of the Churches and the State.

The Spanish flu hit Saint-Denis in April and May 1919, killing thousands of people. During the Holy Week of 1919 alone, the Spanish flu killed nearly 1,000 people in Saint-Denis, a city which had less than 24,000 inhabitants at the time.

Radiotelegraphy services began operation in Saint-Denis in 1923, with a radiotelegraphy station opened in old military barracks at the Barachois. The first radio program broadcast to the public took place in 1927, and the first radio station, Radio Saint-Denis, went on the air in 1929.

In 1938, the old harbor of Le Barachois was filled to create a large square in order to host a large colonial exhibition. On 10 April 1940 the last public execution in Réunion took place at dawn on that square at the Barachois: two men were guillotined for the savage murder of a 78 year-old female shopkeeper in 1937.

In June 1940, after the Fall of France, governor Pierre Émile Aubert decided to declare his loyalty to Marshal Pétain, unlike the French colonial governors in the South Pacific surrounded by British territories, who chose to rally de Gaulle's Free French, and he cut all communications with Mauritius. The British established a naval blockade of Réunion which led to severe food shortages and rationing. The governor pushed local authorities to follow Vichy France policies. In Saint-Denis, the square of Barachois was renamed square Marshal Pétain by the municipal council in February 1941. A Pétain Propaganda Committee was created in Saint-Denis in December 1941, as well as a Marshal Pétain Guard made up of 800 followers of the Révolution nationale. At the same time, an underground resistance movement started to organize itself.

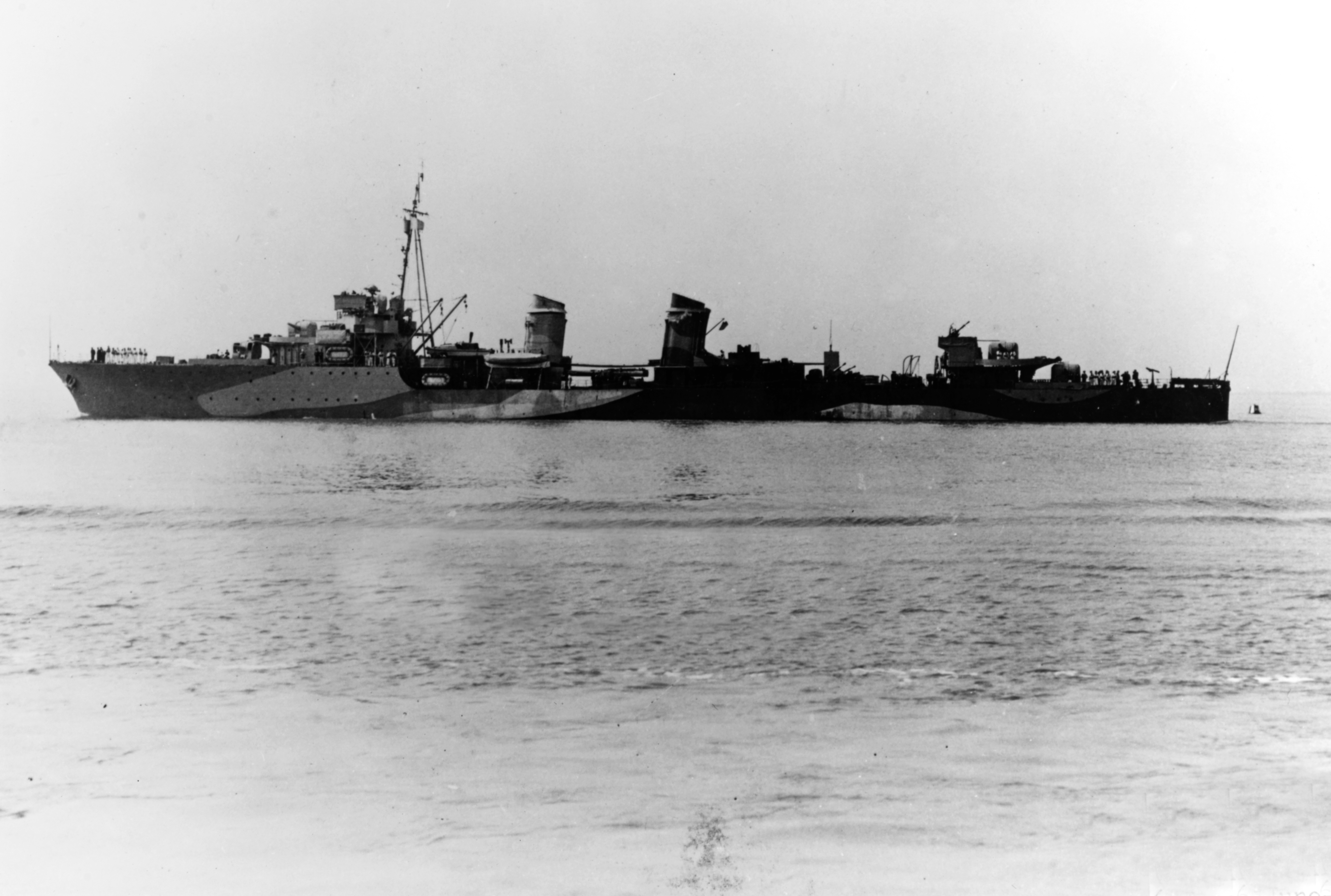
The Léopard, pictured in 1942.

After the successful British landing in Vichy-held Madagascar, and faced with the impossibility to defend Réunion's coastline, governor Aubert on 27 September 1942 decided to declare Saint-Denis an open city and retreat to Hell-Bourg, in the interior of the island. On 28 November the Free French Naval Forces (FNFL) destroyer Léopard, sailing from Mauritius, arrived off Saint-Denis and landed troops unopposed. These troops captured the city and established a Free French governor. Governor Aubert surrendered to the Free French governor on 30 November, thus completing the Liberation of Réunion. All Vichy policies enacted under governor Aubert were reversed in late 1942 and in 1943.

=== Urban expansion (1940s–1970s) ===
After World War II, Saint-Denis entered a new period of population growth and urban development. In February 1945, Air France opened an air route between Paris and Saint-Denis, the first air route linking Réunion with metropolitan France: operated once a week, it took 5 days and 14 stopovers to reach Paris from Saint-Denis. In June 1946, the newer Gillot airfield (now Roland Garros Airport, the international airport of Réunion) was inaugurated 6.5 kilometres (4.0 mi) east of Saint-Denis's city center, in the neighboring commune of Sainte-Marie.

In March 1946, the colony of Réunion was turned into an overseas department of France, which led to the gradual alignment of its social and public services with those of metropolitan France. Malaria eradication campaigns, started in Réunion in 1949 thanks to the new DDT insecticide, led to a dramatic decrease of malaria prevalence in the space of four years, and its complete eradication by 1967. Malaria had acted as a brake on population growth since its arrival in the island in 1868, and with its eradication the island's population soon started to grow tremendously due to high fertility rates.

All these factors, combined with rural flight, led to a new period of rapid expansion for the city of Saint-Denis. After more than 70 years of stagnation, the city's population more than doubled between the 1954 and 1967 censuses.

The June 1946 French legislative election was marked by political violence in Réunion, opposing Communist militants and the Christian-democratic Popular Republican Movement (MRP), which had both emerged from the underground resistance during Vichy rule over the island (1940–1942). On 25 May 1946, in the heat of the campaign, Communist and MRP militants confronted each other in the city center of Saint-Denis, and Alexis de Villeneuve, Gaullist and MRP leader, who was running in the 1st constituency of Réunion (the one including Saint-Denis), where he faced Raymond Vergès, a local Communist leader elected the year before mayor of Saint-Denis, was shot and killed in the mêlée. Paul Vergès, son of Raymond Vergès, and future founder of the Communist Party of Réunion (with which he led the regional council of Réunion from 1998 to 2010), was accused of having fired the fatal shot with a gun belonging to his father found on the scene. Found guilty by the criminal court of Lyon (where the trial had been relocated in order to calm tensions in Réunion), he was granted amnesty in 1953 by the French government.

In 1956 was begun the construction of a major road linking Saint-Denis and La Possession (and from there the seaport of Réunion and the western coast of the island), bypassing the big lava flow which had always impeded communications between Saint-Denis and the western coast of the island. Only a slow railway line built in 1878–1881 in a tunnel under the lava flow and a narrow, winding road climbing the lava flow existed until then, which hindered the economic development of Saint-Denis. The new road, built at the bottom of the cliffs almost at sea-level, took 7 years to complete and was opened to traffic in 1963. It was later enlarged as a 4-lane expressway between 1973 and 1976.

In 1957, a large modern hospital was opened in Saint-Denis, the Centre hospitalier Félix-Guyon, one of the results of the transformation of the colony into an overseas department in 1946.

The 1959 French municipal elections were once again marked by political violence in Réunion. In Saint-Denis, on election day (15 March 1959), a young Communist militant was shot and killed by a Gaullist militant, and another Communist militant was severely injured by the same gunman. Paul Vergès, who was the Communist candidate to become mayor of Saint-Denis, was beaten by Gendarmerie forces during clashes in the streets and left unconscious on the pavement. The Gaullist candidate, Gabriel Macé, was declared winner of the election, but the Communists accused the authorities of electoral fraud. This pushed Vergès to secede from the French Communist Party two months later and found the Communist Party of Réunion, which then campaigned for more autonomy from France. Yet in July 1959, Charles de Gaulle, president of France, received a warm welcome on his arrival to Saint-Denis, the first visit by a French head of state since the foundation of the city.

In 1961, the first modern hotel and the first supermarket opened in Saint-Denis. The city's (and more generally the island's) infrastructure, however, was still largely underdeveloped compared to metropolitan France, and many people lived in great poverty. In the countryside, people often resided in huts with bare earth floor, and the housing situation in the city was getting worse every year with the now rapidly growing population. De Gaulle's prime minister Michel Debré, who had accompanied De Gaulle during his 1959 visit and witnessed the poverty and underdevelopment then prevalent in Réunion, feared that it would push the islanders towards asking independence from France, as had happened in the rest of Africa. After stepping down as prime minister in 1962 following the independence of French Algeria (to which he had been opposed), he was determined to prevent the same fate in Réunion, and decided to stand in the 1st constituency of Réunion by-election to the National Assembly in the beginning of 1963 (after the results of the 1962 French legislative election in that constituency, which the mayor of Saint-Denis Gabriel Macé had won, were invalidated by the Constitutional Council due to renewed electoral fraud).

Michel Debré decisively defeated his Communist rival Paul Vergès when the by-election took place in May 1963, and he became the leader of Réunion's Gaullist and right-wing forces opposed to the autonomy of Réunion demanded by the local Communist Party. Debré used his connections in Paris to promote the economic development of the island and bring its housing and infrastructure closer to metropolitan French level, which benefited Saint-Denis as capital of the island. In 1964, the French National Assembly voted the so-called 'Debré Law' (named after its promoter) that facilitated land expropriation and slum clearance in France's urban areas. The law helped to eradicate the shanty towns that had started to appear in Saint-Denis and other Réunionese cities. The next year was launched the construction of large public housing projects (or council estates) in the neighborhood of Le Chaudron, 4 kilometres (2.5 mi) east of Saint-Denis's city center, to rehouse the people evacuated from the shanty towns, as well as provide housing for low-income newcomers to the city arriving from the countryside. Construction of these projects, capable of housing close to 10,000 people, lasted until 1973.

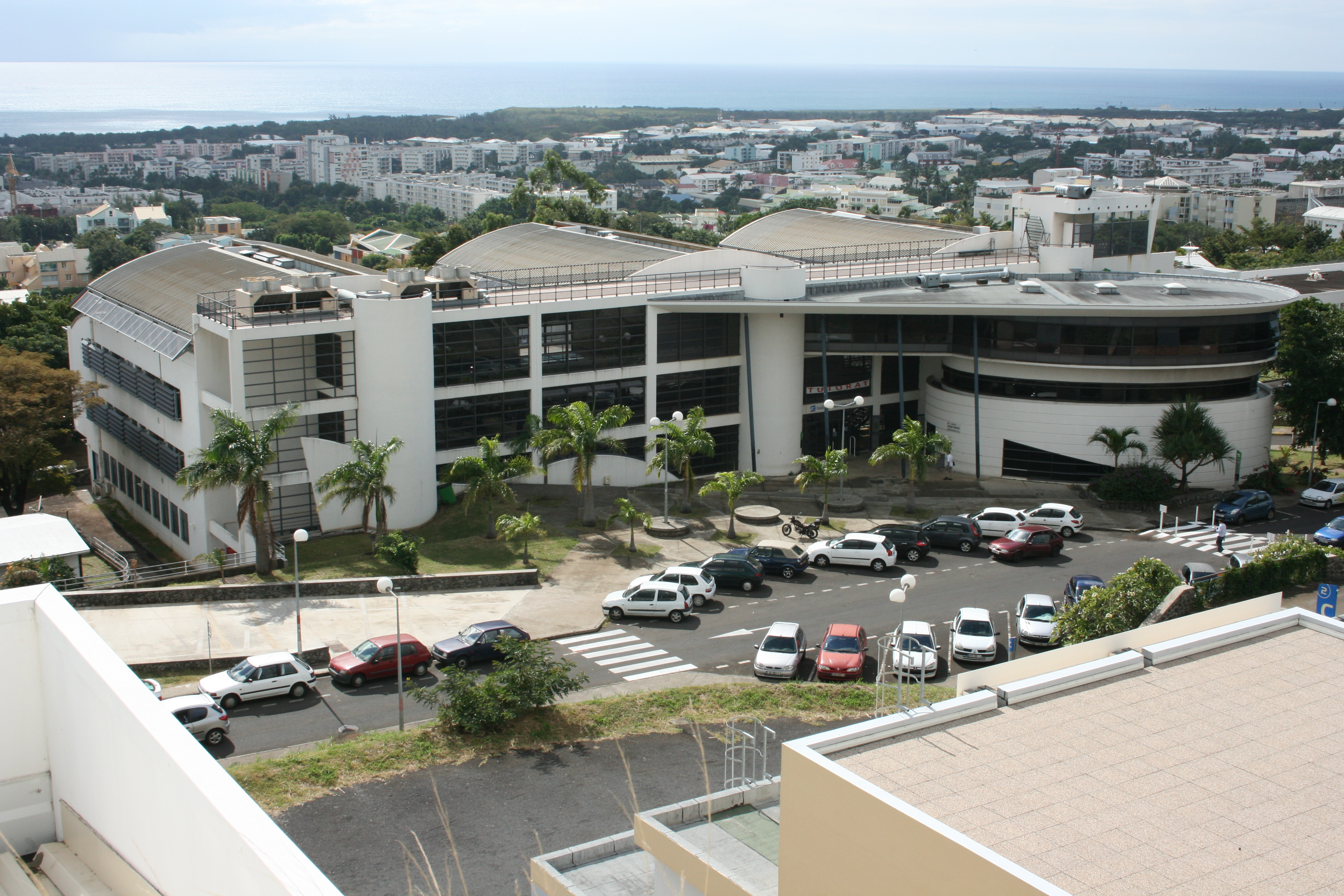
Faculty of Science on the campus of the University of Reunion Island overlooking the city of Saint-Denis.

In December 1964, the first TV station in Réunion opened in Saint-Denis, a local station of the national broadcaster ORTF (which has now become Réunion La Première), whose studios, located at the Barachois near the city center, produced local news programs. A university campus affiliated with the Aix-Marseille University was opened gradually in Saint-Denis between 1964 and 1970, later officially becoming the University of Reunion Island in 1982. In August 1967 the first nonstop commercial flights between Saint-Denis and Paris (operated by Air France's Boeing 707) were launched after the lengthening and modernization of Gillot Airport's runway. Saint-Denis's new modernist city hall was constructed in the 1970s. The city hosted the first Indian Ocean Island Games in 1979 (which it hosted again in 1998 and 2015).

=== 1991 Chaudron riots ===
Economic development and rising incomes, thanks to financial transfers from metropolitan France, led after the 1960s to a Westernization of the local culture and the emergence of a consumer society: TV sets became ubiquitous, large hypermarkets appeared on the outskirts of the city as in metropolitan French cities, selling many products imported from metropolitan France, and the ownership of motor vehicles became generalized, leading to heavy traffic during rush hours in a city whose public transports were not developed. The high level of unemployment and the high cost of living (in part due to imported goods from metropolitan France, as well as high salaries among the French state's public servants) generated frustration and social tensions among a significant part of the city's population with low incomes, who survived thanks to social benefits introduced after the transformation of Réunion into an overseas department in 1946, and who had difficult access to the consumer society and imported goods.

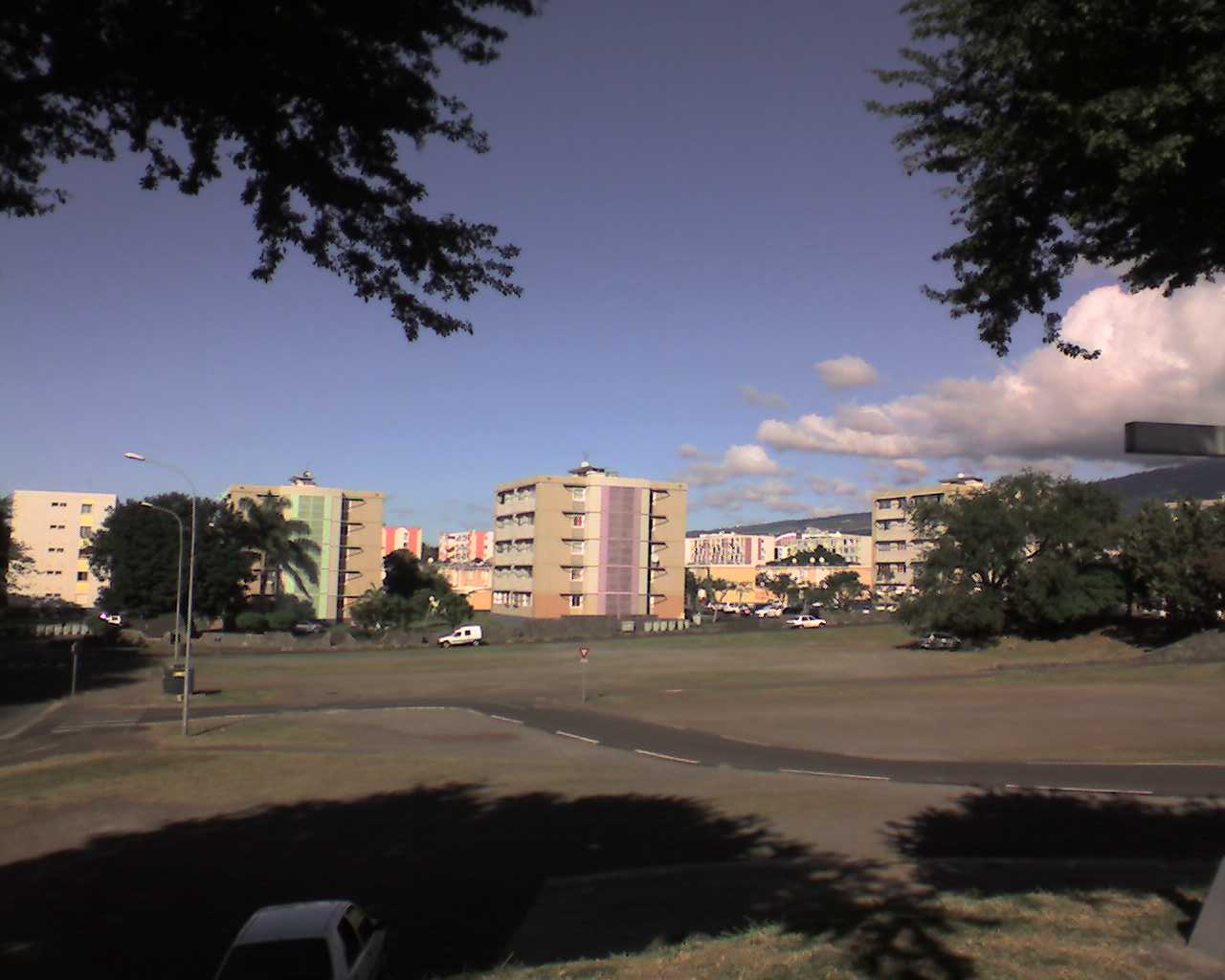
Le Chaudron public housing projects in the city of Saint-Denis in the 2000s.

In 1991, that social tension exploded after the authorities decided to close a TV station, Télé Free Dom, which was broadcasting pirated B movies (action films and erotic movies in particular) and Reunionese Creole talk shows, particularly popular among low-income people. Télé Free Dom had been broadcasting from its studios in Saint-Denis without a license for more than 4 years when CSA, France's electronic media regulatory authority, ordered it to cease operations. Despite protests from its viewers incited by the founder and owner of Télé Free Dom, a metropolitan Frenchman, the French government instructed the prefect of Réunion to seize the transmitter of the TV station on 24 February 1991. A month of riots throughout the city ensued after Télé Free Dom went off air, with their epicenter in the large projects of Le Chaudron built in the 1960s and 1970s.

Hundreds of rioters threw stones at the police, and for several days they torched cars, looted and then set fire to banks, car dealerships, supermarkets, and large DIY and furniture stores in the retail parks on the outskirts of the city. Eight looters died on the night of 25–26 February 1991, trapped inside a burning furniture store, which led to a temporary lull in the riots, but they soon erupted again in March. A visit by prime minister Michel Rocard on 17 March failed to calm the situation down, and it was only after a visit by France's first lady Danielle Mitterrand, who went to the projects at Le Chaudron to discuss with local residents and who promised to relay their grievances to the French president, that the riots finally ended on 24 March.

== Geography ==
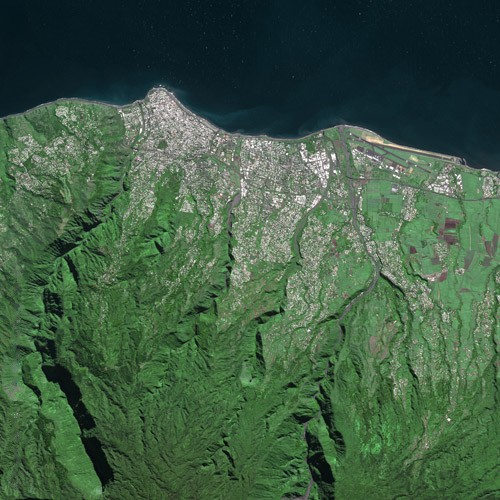
Saint-Denis from the SPOT satellite

The city is located on the north end of the island, and was a port. Saint-Denis was "originally the main port of Réunion, but an artificial harbour at Le Port, on the northwest coast, replaced it in the 1880s, because of unpredictable winds and tides at Saint-Denis." The city includes some of the island's mountains, with a peak elevation of 2,276 meters (7,467 ft) within the metro area, which begins at sea level at the coast line.

The city has many neighbourhoods: Le Barachois, Bellepierre, Bois-de-Nèfles, La Bretagne (Le Cerf), Le Brûlé, Les Camélias, Centre-ville, Champ-Fleuri, La Montagne (Le Colorado, Ruisseau Blanc, Saint-Bernard), Montgaillard, La Providence, La Rivière Saint-Denis (La Redoute), Ruisseau des Noirs, Saint-François, Saint-Jacques, Sainte-Clotilde (Le Butor, le Chaudron, Commune Prima, Domenjod, Le Moufia), La Source, La Trinité, Vauban

=== Climate ===
Saint-Denis features a tropical monsoon climate (Köppen Am) with two distinct seasons: a hot and humid wet season from December to April and a very warm, less humid drier season for the remaining seven months of the year, with June to October qualifying as true dry season months. The dry season does typically feature relatively light rain, but it is not wet enough to be a tropical rainforest climate. During the wet season, tropical cyclones often affect the city.

Climate data for Saint-Denis (Gillot Airport, altitude 8m, 1991–2020 normals, extremes 1953−present)
Month	Jan	Feb	Mar	Apr	May	Jun	Jul	Aug	Sep	Oct	Nov	Dec	Year
Record high °C (°F)	35.2 (95.4)	34.0 (93.2)	33.1 (91.6)	32.7 (90.9)	31.3 (88.3)	29.9 (85.8)	29.0 (84.2)	28.8 (83.8)	29.2 (84.6)	30.7 (87.3)	31.8 (89.2)	34.5 (94.1)	35.2 (95.4)
Mean daily maximum °C (°F)	30.2 (86.4)	30.3 (86.5)	30.0 (86.0)	29.2 (84.6)	27.6 (81.7)	26.2 (79.2)	25.4 (77.7)	25.5 (77.9)	26.0 (78.8)	27.0 (80.6)	28.3 (82.9)	29.5 (85.1)	27.9 (82.2)
Daily mean °C (°F)	26.9 (80.4)	27.0 (80.6)	26.6 (79.9)	25.8 (78.4)	24.2 (75.6)	22.6 (72.7)	21.8 (71.2)	21.9 (71.4)	22.4 (72.3)	23.5 (74.3)	24.7 (76.5)	26.1 (79.0)	24.5 (76.1)
Mean daily minimum °C (°F)	23.6 (74.5)	23.7 (74.7)	23.3 (73.9)	22.3 (72.1)	20.7 (69.3)	19.1 (66.4)	18.2 (64.8)	18.2 (64.8)	18.7 (65.7)	19.9 (67.8)	21.1 (70.0)	22.7 (72.9)	21.0 (69.8)
Record low °C (°F)	18.2 (64.8)	18.6 (65.5)	18.4 (65.1)	15.6 (60.1)	15.3 (59.5)	13.6 (56.5)	12.9 (55.2)	12.8 (55.0)	13.0 (55.4)	13.4 (56.1)	15.0 (59.0)	17.8 (64.0)	12.8 (55.0)
Average precipitation mm (inches)	270.2 (10.64)	279.3 (11.00)	264.5 (10.41)	133.4 (5.25)	95.8 (3.77)	66.9 (2.63)	50.9 (2.00)	54.8 (2.16)	48.5 (1.91)	43.3 (1.70)	62.5 (2.46)	160.2 (6.31)	1,530.3 (60.25)
Average precipitation days (≥ 1 mm)	13.8	13.5	13.5	10.9	9.6	7.5	8.5	8.8	7.5	6.9	6.1	10.2	116.8
Mean monthly sunshine hours	218.1	195.5	215.0	216.1	213.9	210.0	222.4	216.2	210.5	210.8	212.0	226.8	2,567.1
Source: Meteo France

Climate data for Saint-Denis (La Salle Saint-Michel Collège, altitude 36m, 1981–2010 normals, extremes 1997–2016)
Month	Jan	Feb	Mar	Apr	May	Jun	Jul	Aug	Sep	Oct	Nov	Dec	Year
Record high °C (°F)	33.3 (91.9)	35.0 (95.0)	33.3 (91.9)	31.8 (89.2)	32.0 (89.6)	28.5 (83.3)	29.8 (85.6)	28.4 (83.1)	27.7 (81.9)	29.8 (85.6)	31.2 (88.2)	33.2 (91.8)	35.0 (95.0)
Mean daily maximum °C (°F)	29.8 (85.6)	30.2 (86.4)	29.9 (85.8)	28.9 (84.0)	27.4 (81.3)	25.8 (78.4)	24.8 (76.6)	24.7 (76.5)	25.2 (77.4)	25.9 (78.6)	27.0 (80.6)	28.5 (83.3)	27.3 (81.1)
Daily mean °C (°F)	27.2 (81.0)	27.5 (81.5)	27.1 (80.8)	26.2 (79.2)	24.7 (76.5)	23.0 (73.4)	22.0 (71.6)	22.0 (71.6)	22.5 (72.5)	23.2 (73.8)	24.5 (76.1)	26.0 (78.8)	24.6 (76.3)
Mean daily minimum °C (°F)	24.6 (76.3)	24.8 (76.6)	24.4 (75.9)	23.5 (74.3)	22.0 (71.6)	20.2 (68.4)	19.2 (66.6)	19.2 (66.6)	19.7 (67.5)	20.6 (69.1)	22.0 (71.6)	23.5 (74.3)	22.0 (71.6)
Record low °C (°F)	21.5 (70.7)	21.7 (71.1)	21.0 (69.8)	19.0 (66.2)	17.7 (63.9)	16.8 (62.2)	16.4 (61.5)	15.9 (60.6)	16.6 (61.9)	16.3 (61.3)	18.3 (64.9)	19.9 (67.8)	15.9 (60.6)
Average precipitation mm (inches)	250.7 (9.87)	312.6 (12.31)	183.5 (7.22)	109.6 (4.31)	82.2 (3.24)	40.4 (1.59)	37.4 (1.47)	36.1 (1.42)	50.8 (2.00)	28.6 (1.13)	68.1 (2.68)	147.4 (5.80)	1,347.4 (53.05)
Average precipitation days (≥ 1.0 mm)	12.4	12.9	11.0	7.9	8.5	4.2	5.3	5.1	7.2	4.5	4.9	8.4	92.1
Source: Météo France

Climate data for Saint-Denis (Le Brule - Val Fleuri SAPC, altitude 1069m, 1991–2020 normals, extremes 1969–2004)
Month	Jan	Feb	Mar	Apr	May	Jun	Jul	Aug	Sep	Oct	Nov	Dec	Year
Record high °C (°F)	29.8 (85.6)	29.7 (85.5)	28.6 (83.5)	28.7 (83.7)	27.0 (80.6)	24.6 (76.3)	25.3 (77.5)	24.5 (76.1)	24.5 (76.1)	25.7 (78.3)	27.3 (81.1)	29.2 (84.6)	29.8 (85.6)
Mean daily maximum °C (°F)	24.4 (75.9)	24.4 (75.9)	24.4 (75.9)	23.8 (74.8)	21.9 (71.4)	20.1 (68.2)	19.4 (66.9)	19.2 (66.6)	19.4 (66.9)	20.1 (68.2)	21.4 (70.5)	23.1 (73.6)	21.8 (71.2)
Daily mean °C (°F)	20.2 (68.4)	20.4 (68.7)	20.1 (68.2)	19.1 (66.4)	17.3 (63.1)	15.2 (59.4)	14.4 (57.9)	14.4 (57.9)	14.7 (58.5)	15.7 (60.3)	16.9 (62.4)	18.9 (66.0)	17.3 (63.1)
Mean daily minimum °C (°F)	16.0 (60.8)	16.3 (61.3)	15.7 (60.3)	14.4 (57.9)	12.6 (54.7)	10.4 (50.7)	9.4 (48.9)	9.6 (49.3)	10.0 (50.0)	11.2 (52.2)	12.5 (54.5)	14.7 (58.5)	12.7 (54.9)
Record low °C (°F)	11.2 (52.2)	11.5 (52.7)	10.2 (50.4)	9.8 (49.6)	6.0 (42.8)	4.6 (40.3)	4.5 (40.1)	4.7 (40.5)	4.0 (39.2)	5.6 (42.1)	7.0 (44.6)	8.0 (46.4)	4.0 (39.2)
Average precipitation mm (inches)	509.7 (20.07)	540.8 (21.29)	431.8 (17.00)	165.3 (6.51)	134.3 (5.29)	71.7 (2.82)	59.9 (2.36)	72.5 (2.85)	79.8 (3.14)	81.9 (3.22)	122.4 (4.82)	273.6 (10.77)	2,543.7 (100.15)
Average precipitation days (≥ 1.0 mm)	18.9	16.2	14.9	12.1	10.0	7.3	7.9	8.1	9.2	9.8	11.4	14.4	140.2
Source: Météo-France

== Demographics ==
Saint-Denis is the most populous commune in the French overseas departments. The population of St Denis has grown substantially since 1954, both in the commune and the metropolitan area. In the 69 years from 1954 to the census in 2023, population has nearly quadrupled. The annual rate of population growth has been lower in the 21st century than in the 20th century.

Historical population Saint-Denis (commune)

Year	Pop.	±% p.a.
1872	32,452	—
1877	32,050	−0.25%
1881	30,835	−0.96%
1887	30,035	−0.44%
1892	28,759	−0.86%
1897	28,387	−0.26%
1902	27,392	−0.71%
1907	25,689	−1.28%
1911	23,972	−1.71%

Year	Pop.	±% p.a.
1921	21,538	−1.06%
1926	23,390	+1.66%
1931	26,807	+2.76%
1936	30,762	+2.79%
1941	32,637	+1.19%
1946	35,971	+1.96%
1954	41,863	+1.80%
1961	65,275	+6.30%
1967	85,444	+4.57%

Year	Pop.	±% p.a.
1974	103,512	+2.78%
1982	109,072	+0.71%
1990	121,999	+1.41%
1999	131,557	+0.84%
2007	140,733	+0.87%
2012	145,238	+0.63%
2017	147,931	+0.37%
2023	155,634	+0.85%

Source: Local censuses up to 1946. INSEE censuses since 1954.

Historical population Saint-Denis (metropolitan area)
Year	Pop.	±% p.a.
1954	86,267	—
1961	117,345	+4.32%
1967	146,215	+3.72%
1974	173,346	+2.46%
1982	187,541	+1.07%
1990	215,970	+1.78%
1999	251,044	+1.69%
2007	284,087	+1.59%
2012	296,894	+0.89%
2017	307,374	+0.70%
2023	326,743	+1.02%
Source: INSEE

The places of birth of the 304,178 residents in the Saint-Denis metropolitan area at the 2015 census were the following:

- 81.1% were born in Réunion
- 11.1% in Metropolitan France
- 1.1% in Mayotte
- 0.3% in other parts of Overseas France
- 6.4% in foreign countries (notably Madagascar, the Union of the Comoros, and Mauritius); half of them were immigrants and the other half were children of French citizens born abroad (children of Réunionese settlers in Madagascar for example)

== Transport ==
The closest airport is Roland Garros Airport, 7 km east of the city in Sainte-Marie, Réunion, which is also the main international airport of Réunion. Air Austral is the regional air carrier, with its Indian Ocean hub located at the airport. The airline has begun serving some cities in mainland France. Five or six other airlines serve the airport. There is a good road network in Saint-Denis.

On 15 March 2022 an aerial tramway, named Papang, started operating, stretching 2.7 km (approximately 1.67 mi) and serving 5 stations between the neighbourhoods of Le Chaudron and Bois-de-Nèfles.

== Mayors ==
- 2020–present: Ericka Bareigts, PS
- 2008–2020: Gilbert Annette, PS
- 2001–2008: René-Paul Victoria, UMP
- 1994–2001: Michel Tamaya, PS
- 1989–1994: Gilbert Annette, PS
- 1969–1989: Auguste Legros, RPR

== Culture ==
- Léon Dierx Museum (art gallery and museum)
- Jardin de l'État (public gardens – includes a natural history museum)
- Le Barachois, seafront park
- La Roche Écrite (15 km (9 mi) south of the city), summit overlooking Saint-Denis, with impressive views over the city
- Brasseries de Bourbon

== Places of worship ==
Among the places of worship, they are predominantly Christian churches and temples : Roman Catholic Diocese of Saint-Denis de La Réunion (Catholic Church), Assemblies of God. There are also Muslim mosques.

== Education ==
The University of Reunion Island admits 15,000 students each year, with 6 campus sites in Saint-Denis. Course work is aligned with European standards for university education. There is a school of engineering as well. The language is French, and there are connections with educational institutions in France on the continent of Europe.

The commune maintains various elementary schools for each sector.

== Economy ==
IBM has an office in Saint-Denis. The island began organizing to be a digital hub for nearby African nations, relying on its two undersea cables for good internet connections. The potential for services would alter the island's economy, now reliant on sugar, an agricultural product. The university in Saint-Denis has programs to educate the young population in digital skills. New businesses are forming to serve the needs of airlines for software.

== International relations ==
Saint-Denis, Réunion is twinned with:

- Metz, France
- Nice, France
- Tangier, Morocco
- Taiyuan, China

== Notable residents ==
Sentenced to exile in Réunion, the Moroccan Rais Abd el-Krim lived a few years in Saint-Denis from 1926 to 1947.

Prince Bảo Vàng of Vietnam (also known as Yves Claude Vinh San) the son of Emperor Duy Tân, was born and resided in Saint-Denis, Réunion for his final years. His family also resided there.

Other people connected with Saint-Denis include:

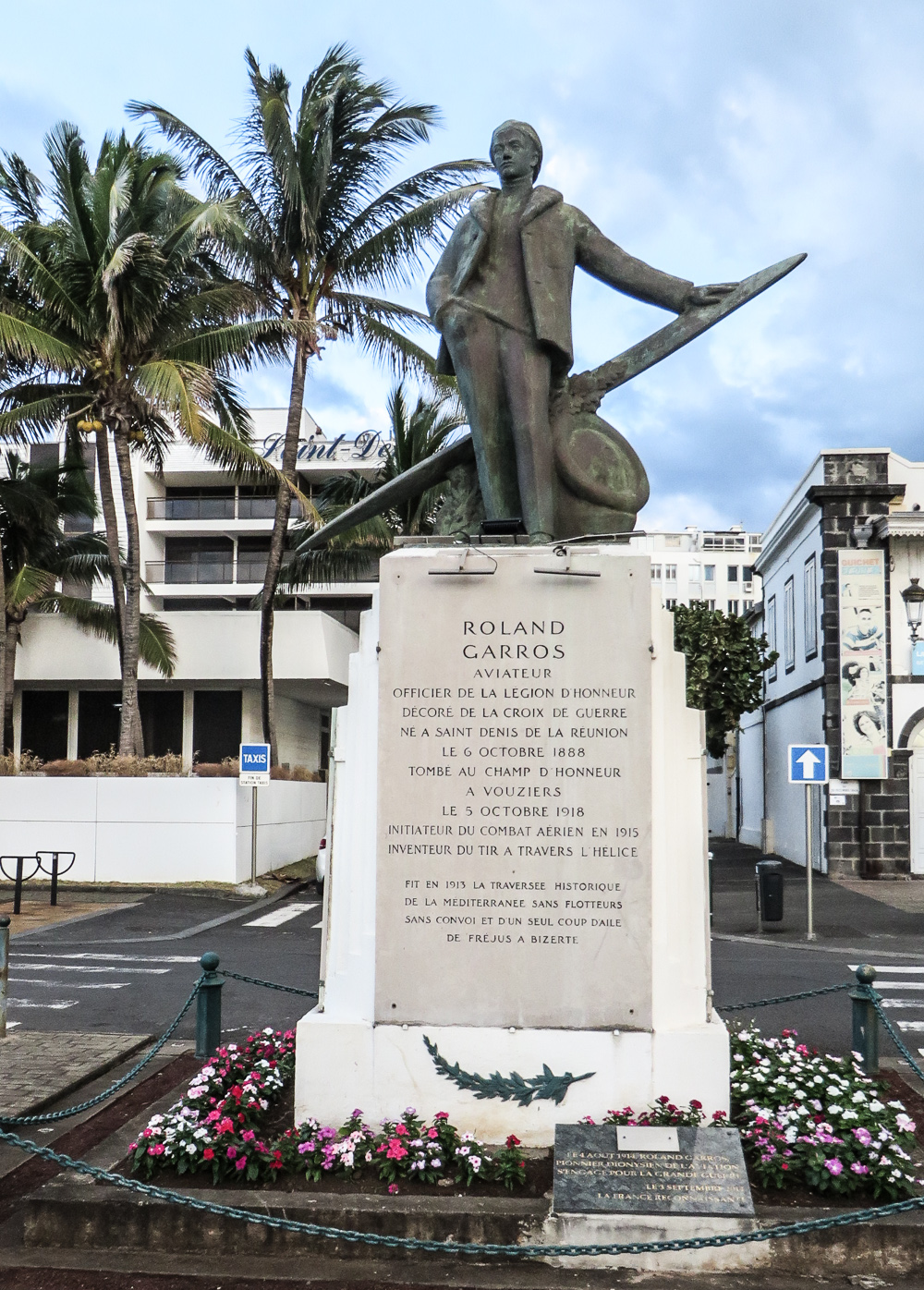
Monument honoring Roland Garros at Le Barachois

- Jean Michel Claude Richard (1787–1868), botanist, died in St Denis
- Félix Guyon (1831–1920), urologist
- Édouard Hervé (1835–1899), journalist and academician
- Juliette Dodu (1848–1909), resistant to the war of 1870
- Ambroise Vollard (1866–1939), art dealer and gallery
- Raymond Vergès (1882–1957), mayor of the town, founder of Témoignages
- Roland Garros (1888–1918), aviator
- Émile Hugot (1904–1993), industrialist in sugarcane
- Jean-Henri Azéma (1913–2000), poet
- Raymond Barre (1924–2007), politician
- Julienne Salvat (1932–2019), teacher, poet, femme de lettres, actress
- Jean-Michel Macron (1950), politician
- Daniel Sangouma (1965), sprinter
- Gérald De Palmas (1967), singer
- Surya Bonaly (1973), International Olympic Skater
- Willy Grondin (1974), football player
- Alexandre Loupy (1977) nephrologist and medical researcher
- Daniel Narcisse (1979), International handball
- Valérie Gauvin (1996), football player
- Jonathan Kievit (1998), known professionally as Imanu, DJ and musician
- Melvine Malard (born 2000), footballer for the France national team

== See also ==
- Communes of the Réunion department
