= Roos (surname) =

Family name

Roos is a surname with multiple origins. In Dutch, Low German, Swiss German and Estonian “Roos” means “Rose” and the surname is often of toponymic origin (e.g. someone lived in a house named “the rose”). In 2007, 8600 people were named Roos and another 2880 “de Roos” in the Netherlands. In the UK, Roos may be of patronymic origin (“Andrews”) or indicating red hair (Old English “Rouse”). The name is also relatively common in Sweden (5,902 people in 2010), Finland (1219 in 2012) and Estonia (934 people in 2019). People with the name "Roos" or "de Roos" include:

== Academics ==
- Anna Maria Roos (1862–1938), Swedish educator, author, theosophist and songwriter
- Antoon Gerard Roos (1877–1953), Dutch philologist
- Björn Roos (1937–2010), Swedish theoretical chemist
- Charles F. Roos (1901–1958), American economist
- Folkert de Roos (1920–2000), Dutch economist
- Göran Roos, Swedish business theorist
- Jan-Erik Roos, Swedish mathematician
- J P Roos (born 1945), Finnish sociologist
- Johan Roos (born 1961), Swedish organizational theorist
- Leslie Roos (born 1940), American-Canadian professor of health sciences
- Noralou P. Roos (born 1942), American-Canadian professor of community health sciences

== Arts ==
- Aarand Roos (1940–2020), Estonian linguist, writer and diplomat
- Alexander Roos (c. 1810–1881), Italian-born British architect and urban planner
- Bellan Roos (1901–1990), Swedish actress
- Cajetan Roos (1690–1770), Italian landscape painter, son of Philipp Peter
- Camilla Overbye Roos (born 1969), Danish film actress
- Cornelis Sebille Roos (1754–1820), Dutch art dealer
- Don Roos (born 1959), American screenwriter and film director
- Eddy Roos (born 1949), Dutch draughtsman and sculptor
- Enn Roos (1908–1990), Estonian Soviet sculptor
- Eva Roos (1872–1956), British children's books illustrator
- Ewa Roos (born 1949), Swedish singer and actress
- Fred Roos (1934–2024), American film producer
- Graham Roos (born 1966), British producer, writer and performer
- Jaime Roos (born 1953), Uruguayan musician
- Jan Roos (c. 1591–1638), Flemish painter who worked in Italy as Giovanni Rosa
- Joanna Roos (1901–1989), American actress and playwright
- Johann Heinrich Roos (1631–1685), German painter, father of Philipp Peter and Johann Melchior
- Johann Melchior Roos (1663–1731), German painter, son of Johann Heinrich
- Joseph Roos (1726–1805), Austrian painter, son of Cajetan
- Kjell Roos (born 1965), Swedish guitarist and singer
- Martin Roos (born 1972), Swedish guitarist and manager of Kent
- Mathilda Roos (1852–1908), Swedish writer
- Mary Roos (born 1949), German singer and actor
- Philipp Peter Roos (1655–1706), German painter, son of Johann Heinrich
- Rosalie Roos (1899–1982), American jeweller and silversmith
- S.H. de Roos (1877–1962), Dutch type and book cover designer and artist
- Stefan Roos (born 1970), Swedish actor and screenwriter
- Theodor Roos (1638–1698), German painter, brother of Johann Heinrich
- Toon Roos (born 1964), Dutch jazz saxophonist and composer
- William Roos (1808–1878), Welsh painter and engraver
- William Roos (1911–1987), American novelist, playwright, and screenwriter

== Military ==
- Axel Erik Roos (1684–1765), Swedish general
- Carl Gustaf Roos (1655–1702), Swedish general
- George Roos-Keppel (1866–1921), British military officer
- Helm Roos (1930–1992), South African general
- Margareta Elisabeth Roos (1696–1772), Swedish-Estonian cross-dressing female in the Swedish army

== Politics ==
- Ants Roos (1885–1962), Estonian politician
- Jochen K. Roos (born 1990), German politician
- John Roos (born 1955), American diplomat, former Ambassador to Japan
- Karl Roos (1878–1940), Alsace politician
- Lawrence K. Roos (1918–2005), American (Missouri) banker and politician
- Malte Tängmark Roos (born 1994), Swedish politician
- Mike Roos (born 1946), American (Californian) politician
- Reet Roos (born 1973), Estonian politician
- Thea de Roos (born 1949), Dutch historian and politician
- Tielman Roos (1879–1935), South African politician

== Sports ==
- Aat de Roos (1919–1992), Dutch field hockey player
- Angelica Roos (born 1989), Swedish weightlifter
- Ann-Sofi Roos (born 1959), Swedish Olympic swimmer
- Axel Roos (born 1964), German football player and coach
- Bertil Roos (1943–2016), Formula One driver from Sweden
- Céline Roos (1953–2021), French and Canadian chess player
- Daniël Roos (born 1959), French chess master
- David Roos (born 1982), South African paralympian athlete
- De Wet Roos (born 1990), South African-born Australian rugby player
- Elena Roos (born 1991), Swiss orienteer
- Elisandro Naressi Roos (born 1976), a.k.a. Santiago, Brazilian footballer
- Fanny Roos (born 1995), Swedish shot putter
- Gerrit Roos (1898–1969), Dutch weightlifter
- JC Roos (born 1990), South African rugby player
- Jake Roos (born 1980), South African golfer
- Janek Roos (born 1974), Danish badminton player
- Jennifer Roos (born 1971), American basketball coach
- Jordan Roos (born 1953), American football player
- Kelle Roos (born 1992), Dutch footballer
- Louis Roos (born 1957), French chess player
- Michael Roos (born 1982), Estonian-born American football player
- Michel Roos (1932–2002), French chess player
- Nadine Roos (born 1996), South African rugby union and sevens
- Nancy Roos (1905–1957), American chess player
- Nel Roos-Lodder (1914–1996), Dutch discus thrower
- Paul Roos (1880–1948), South African rugby player, first Springbok captain
- Paul Roos (born 1963), Australian rules football player and coach
- Suzy Powell-Roos (born 1976), American discus thrower
- Swede Roos (1913–1979), American professional basketball player and coach

== Other ==
- Barney Roos (1888–1960), American automotive engineer
- Charlotta Roos (1771–1809), Swedish occult medium
- Christian Roos (1826–1896), German Roman Catholic bishop
- Jan Roos (born 1977), Dutch columnist
- Jørgen Roos (1922–1998), Danish documentary filmmaker
- Magnus Friedrich Roos (1727–1803), German theologian
- Martin Roos (born 1942), Romanian Roman Catholic bishop
- Rachel Roos (1923–1989), Dutch World War II resistance fighter
- Robert de Roos (c. 1170–1227), ancestor of the Barons Ros of Helmsley
- Rosalie Roos (1823–1898), Swedish feminist activist and writer
- Victor Roos (1888–1964), American founder of several aircraft companies, including Cessna
- Wilhelm Roos (1858–1944), Finnish Lutheran clergyman and politician

== See also ==
- Roos (disambiguation)
- Roos af Hjelmsäter Swedish noble family of Norwegian origin
- Roo (disambiguation)
- Rose (surname)
