= Roosmann =

Roosmann is a surname. Notable people with the surname include:

- Magnus Roosmann, Swedish actor
- Emilia Roosmann, Swedish-Norwegian actress

== See also ==
- Roosma
- Roos
- Rossmann (disambiguation)
- Rosman (disambiguation)
- Rozman
