= Hendrick ten Oever =

Dutch Golden Age painter

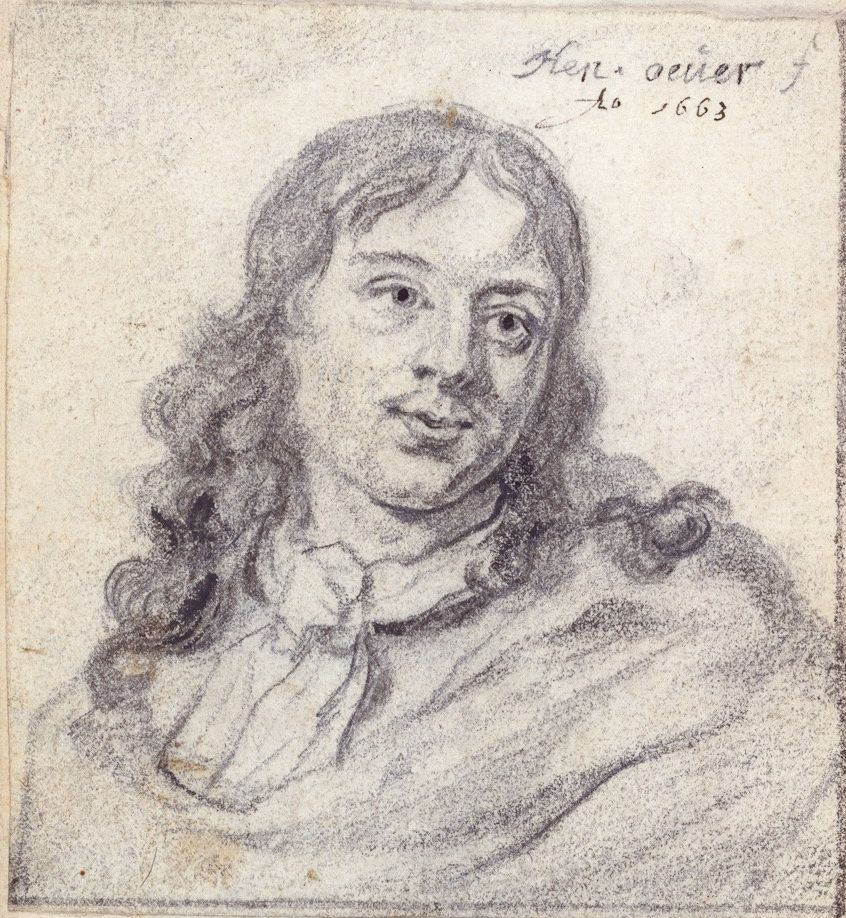
Probable self-portrait for the Album amicorum of Jacobus Heyblocq (1623-1690), 1663

Hendrick ten Oever (1639 – 1716), was a Dutch Golden Age painter.

== Biography ==
He was born in Zwolle as the son of David ten Oever and Marijke Molkenbuer. His earliest dated work is from 1657 and is a portrait of Rabo Herman Schele, a gentleman from Overijssel. The work is strongly related to the portraits painted by Eva van Marle.

According to the RKD he was a pupil of Eva van Marle in Zwolle before travelling to Amsterdam in 1659 where he took lessons from his cousin Cornelis de Bie along with the brothers Johan Heinrich and Theodor Roos. He is considered to be a member of the Pieter de Hooch school of genre painting, along with Esaias Boursse, Hendrick van der Burgh, Pieter Janssens Elinga, Cornelis de Man, and Jacob Vrel.

In 1665 he was back in Zwolle where he lived on the Sassenstraat across from Gesina ter Borch. In 1675 he married Geertruidt van der Horst there and they had 4 children. He is known for landscapes and cityscapes as well as portraits.

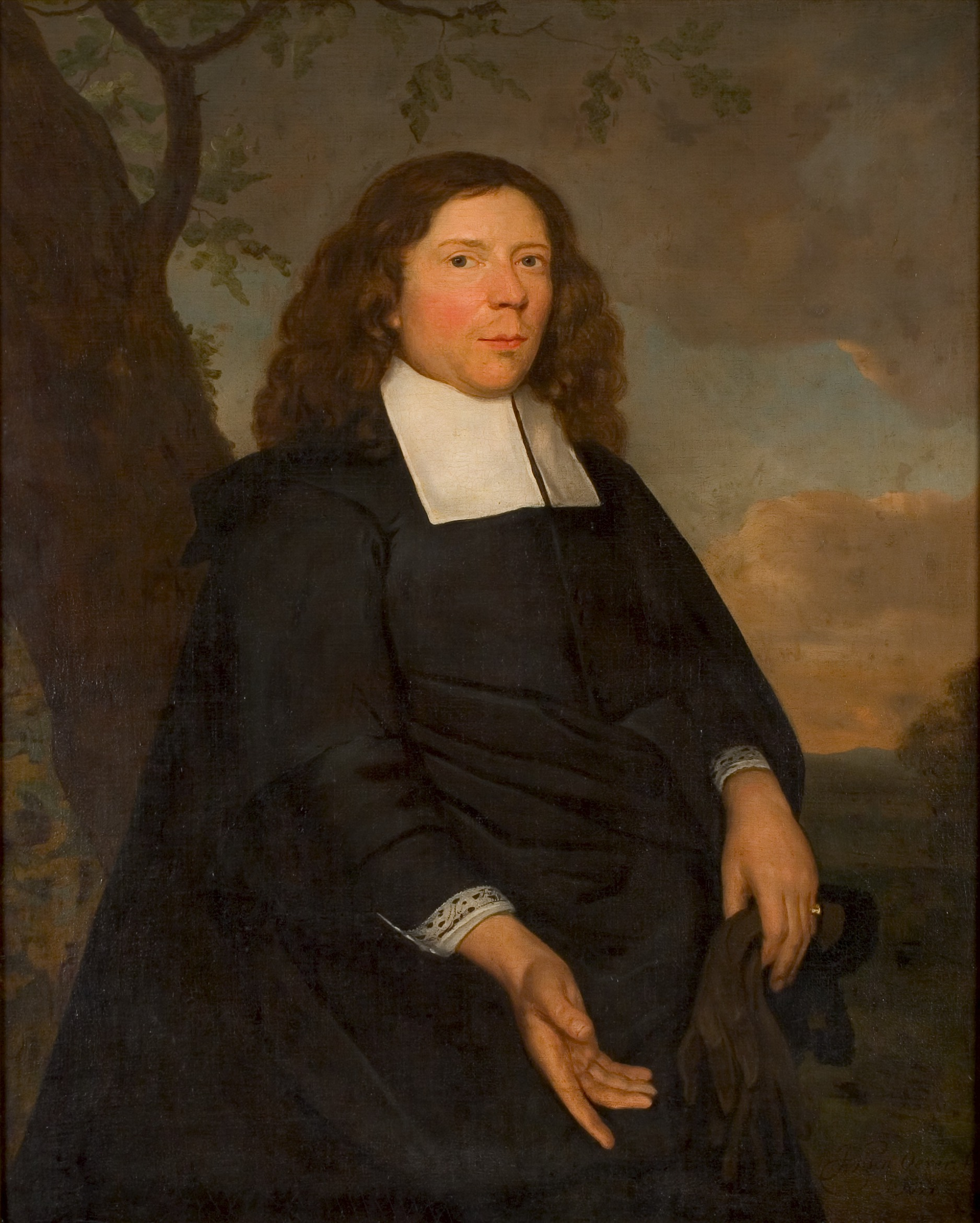
Portrait of a Man, 1677

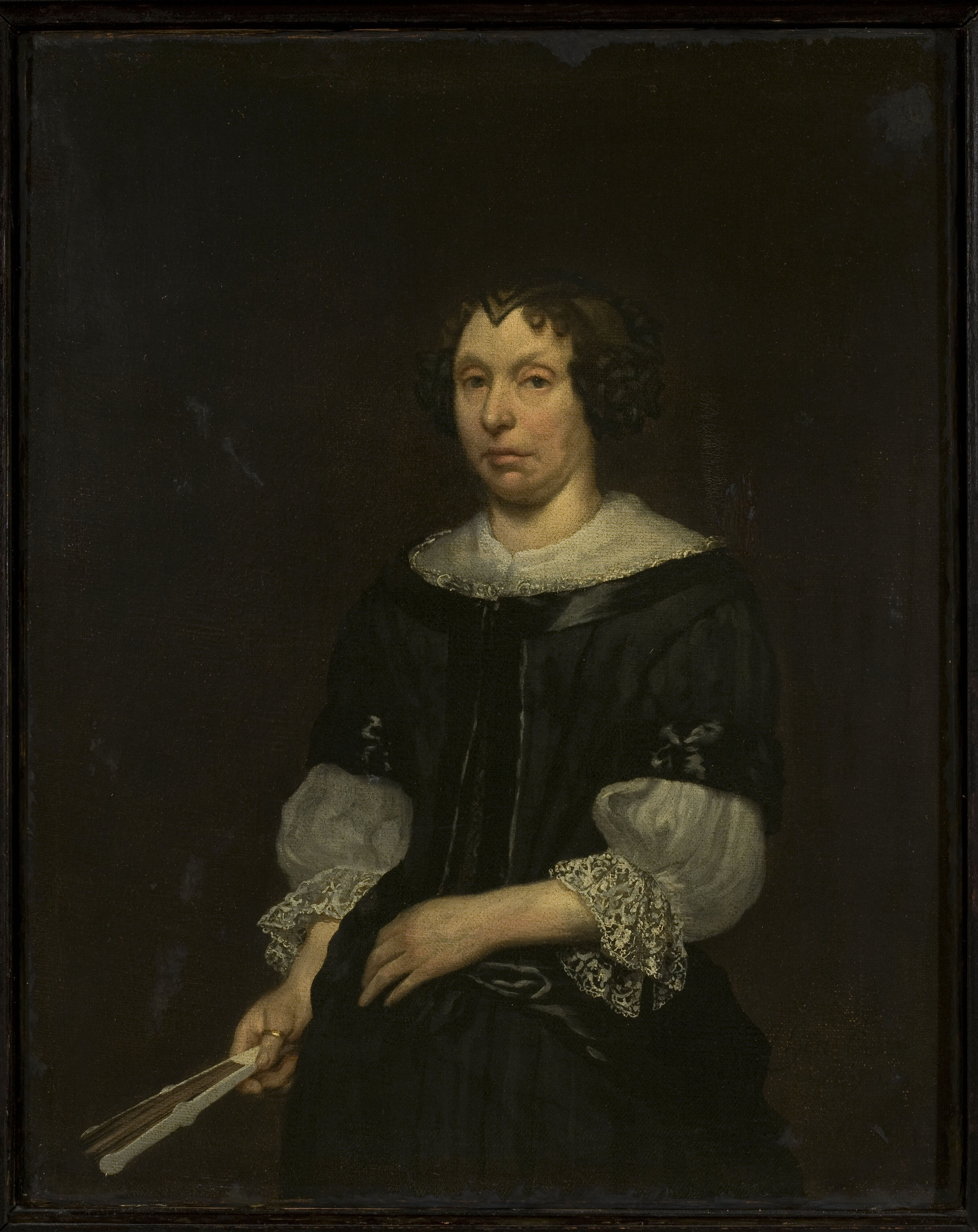
Portrait of a Lady with a Folding Fan, 1690

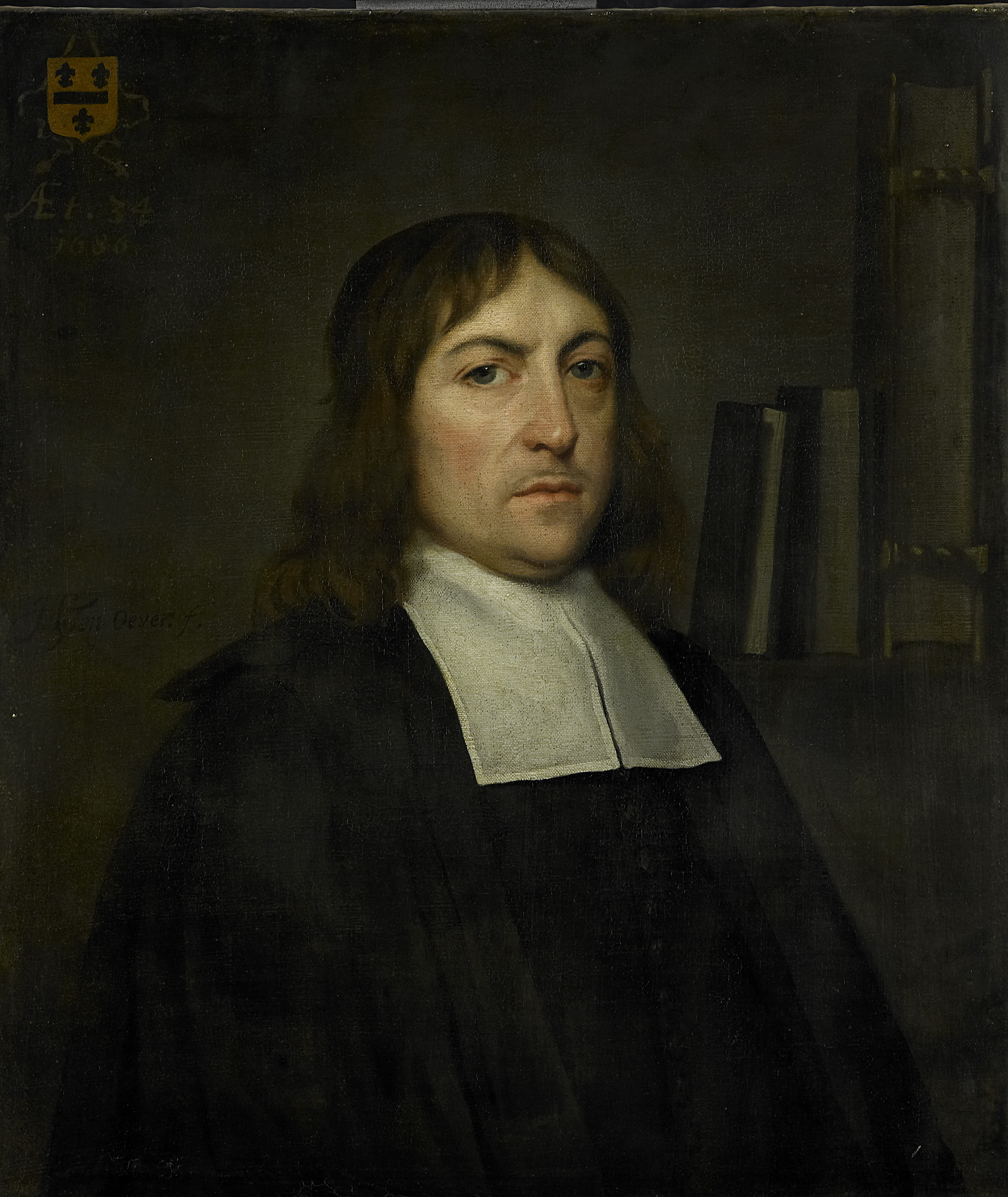
Portrait of Barend Hakvoort, 1686

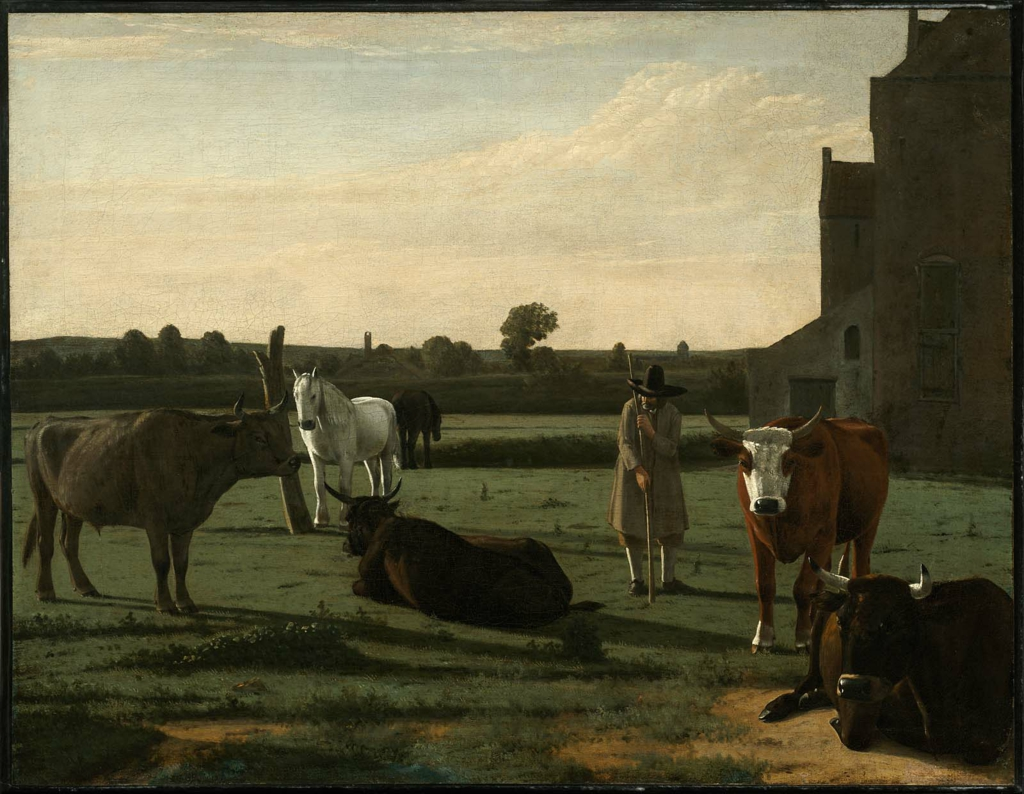
Cattle and Horses with a Herdsman

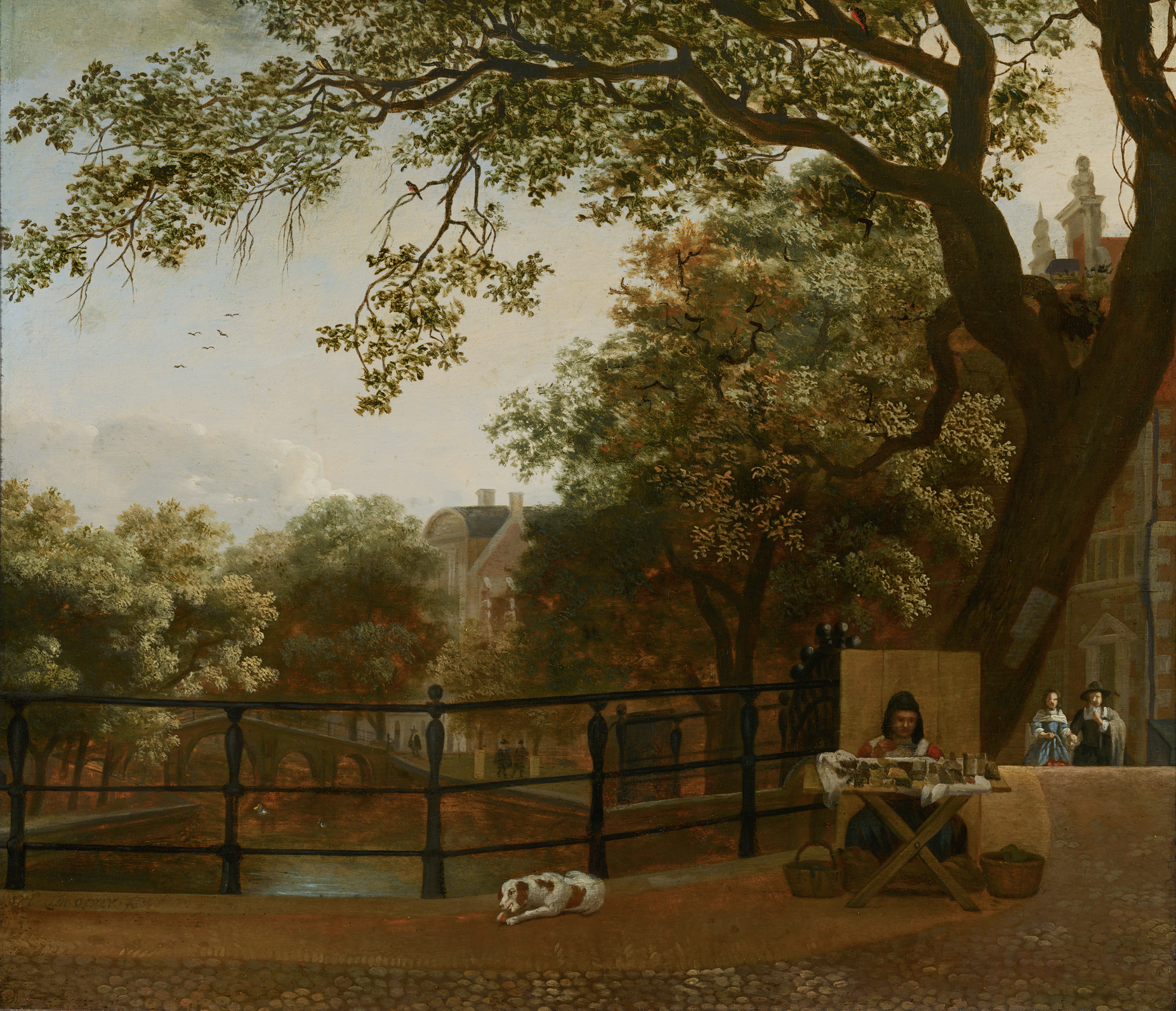
View of the Herengracht in Amsterdam, c. 1690
