= Rue (disambiguation) =

Rue (Ruta graveolens) is a scented ornamental plant and culinary herb.

Rue may also refer to:

== Botany ==
- Ruta or the rue genus—whose species' common names often include "rue"
- Rutaceae or the rue family
- Asplenium ruta-muraria or wall rue, a fern
- Galega officinalis or goat's-rue, an edible legume
- Peganum harmala, Syrian, African or wild rue
- Tephrosia virginiana, also "goat's rue", a subshrub native to North America
- Thalictrum or the meadow-rues, in the buttercup family

== Language ==
- Rue, a dialect of the Sena language of Mozambique
- Rusyn language, spoken in central Europe (ISO 639: rue)

== Music ==
- Rue (ballad), a traditional British and Irish ballad
- "Rue", a 2020 song by Girl in Red

== People ==
- Rue (surname), list of people so named
- Rue Mapp, American outdoor enthusiast and environmentalist
- Rue McClanahan (1934–2010), American actress and comedian
- Rue Protzer (born 1966), German jazz musician

=== Fictional characters ===
- Rue, from The Hunger Games trilogy
- Rue, a fox from the OneShot video game
- Rue, from the Princess Tutu anime
- Rue Bennett, protagonist of the television series Euphoria

== Places ==
- Rue, Somme, France
  - Canton of Rue
- Rue, Switzerland
- Rue, Virginia, United States

== Other uses ==
- Rifts Ultimate Edition, a 1990 tabletop role-playing game
- Russian Union of Engineers

== See also ==
- A Rúa, Spanish municipality with demonym Rues
- La Rue (disambiguation)
- Rew (disambiguation)
- Roo (disambiguation)
- Roux, in cooking, a thickening agent
- Ru (disambiguation)
- Rue21, a clothing and accessories retailer
