= Rew =

Rew or REW may refer to:

== People ==
- Rew (surname)

== Places ==
=== England ===
- Rew Down, a nature reserve on the Isle of Wight
- Rew Street, an Isle of Wight village
- Rewe, Devon

=== United States ===
- Rew, Pennsylvania

== Technical abbreviations ==
- Rewind (disambiguation), in audiovisual media
- Rewrite (disambiguation), in copy editing
- Read-erase-write (REW) or Read-modify-erase-write (RMEW) operations for garbage collection of flash memory

== Other uses ==
- Real Estate Weekly, an American property magazine
- Romanisches Etymologisches Wörterbuch or the Romance Etymological Dictionary by Friedrich Christian Diez and revised by Wilhelm Meyer-Lübke
- Rew-Ardashir, a titular see in the Chaldean Catholic Church
- Ruby Eyed White, a variety of Angora rabbit

== See also ==
- Reenu-Rew, a radical Marxist group in Senegal
- Rewe (disambiguation)
- Roo (disambiguation)
- Rowing
- Ru (disambiguation)
- Rue (disambiguation)
