= Ru =

Ru, ru, or RU may refer to:

== Russia ==
- Russia (ISO 3166-1 alpha-2 country code)
- Russian language (ISO 639 alpha-2 code)
- .ru, the Internet country code top-level domain for Russia

== China ==
- Rù (入), the entering tone in Chinese language phonetics
- Rú (儒), a Chinese language term for Confucianism
- Ru (surname) (茹), a Chinese surname
- Ru River (汝), in Henan, China
- Ru ware, a type of Chinese pottery
- Ru (upper garment) (襦)

== Educational institutions ==
- Rajasthan University in Rajasthan, India
- Radboud University Nijmegen, in Nijmegen, Netherlands
- Radford University, in Virginia, USA
- Rai University in Gujarat, India
- Rajshahi University in Bangladesh
- Rama University in India
- Ramkhamhaeng University in Thailand
- Rangoon University in Burma
- Regis University in Colorado, USA
- Reykjavík University Iceland
- Rhodes University in Grahamstown, South Africa
- Rockefeller University in New York, USA
- Rockhurst University in Missouri, USA
- Roosevelt University in Chicago, Illinois, USA
- Rowan University in New Jersey, USA
- Ruse University in Bulgaria
- Rutgers University in New Jersey, USA
- Ryerson University, the former name of Toronto Metropolitan University in Ontario, Canada

== Science and technology ==
- Resource Unit, a unit used in 802.11 wireless
- Rack unit, a measurement of the height of electronic equipment commonly installed in 19-inch racks
- Ruthenium, symbol Ru, a chemical element
- The "backwards-R U" Recognized Component Mark of Underwriters Laboratories

== Transport ==
- AirBridge Cargo (IATA airline code)
- Rawa Buntu railway station (coded RU) in South Tangerang, Indonesia
- Renigunta Junction railway station (Indian Railways station code)

== Other uses ==
- Ru (kana), the romanisation of the Japanese kana る and ル
- Ru (cuneiform), a sign in cuneiform writing
- Ru (novel), a novel by Canadian novelist Kim Thúy
- Ru (film), a film by Canadian director Charles-Olivier Michaud based on Kim Thúy's novel
- Ruanda-Urundi, former German and Belgian colony (today Rwanda and Burundi)
- Rückkehr unerwünscht "return unwanted", a Nazi designation for concentration camp prisoners who were forbidden to be released
- RuPaul, an American drag queen, actor, and television personality
- Rugby union

== See also ==
- Rew (disambiguation)
- Rewe (disambiguation)
- Roo (disambiguation)
- Rou (disambiguation)
- Rue (disambiguation)
- Ruu
