= Roosma =

Roosma is an Estonian surname. In a number of cases it resulted from Estonization of the surname Roosmann. Notable people with the surname include:

- John Roosma, American amateur basketball player
- Peeter Roosma (born 1972), Estonian lawyer and judge, representative of Estonia at the European Court of Human Rights
- Tuuli Roosma, Estonian television journalist and producer
- William A. Roosma, American career army officer

== See also ==
- Roos
