= Rewe =

Rewe may refer to:

- Rewe, Devon, England, a village
- REWE, a German supermarket chain
- REWE Group, a diversified group of retail and tourism businesses, whose holdings include the German supermarket chain
- Rehue, an altar used by the Mapuche of Chile

== See also ==
- Rew (disambiguation)
- Roo (disambiguation)
- Ru (disambiguation)
- Rue (disambiguation)
