= Leon L. Lewis =

American attorney, spymaster, and non-profit executive (1888–1954)

- Born: September 5, 1888; Hurley, Wisconsin, U.S.
- Died: May 20, 1954 (aged 65); Pacific Palisades, California, U.S.
- Occupation: Attorney
- Known for: Anti-Nazi Spymaster
- Spouse: Ruth Lewis (m. 1920)
- Children: 2

Leon Lawrence Lewis (September 5, 1888 – May 20, 1954) was an American attorney, the first national secretary of the Anti-Defamation League, the national director of B'nai B'rith, the founder and first executive director of the Los Angeles Jewish Community Relations Committee, and a key figure in the spy operations that infiltrated American Nazi organizations in the 1930s and early 1940s. The Nazis referred to Lewis as "the most dangerous Jew in Los Angeles."

== Early life ==
Lewis was the son of Casper and Rachel Lewis, German Jewish immigrants who migrated to Wisconsin. He grew up in Milwaukee and attended the University of Wisconsin and George Washington University. Lewis received a J.D. degree from the University of Chicago Law School in 1913. He was fluent in English, German, and Yiddish.

== Career ==
After graduating from law school, Lewis accepted the position of national secretary of the Anti-Defamation League, and began to work on discrimination cases in the Midwest. When the United States entered World War I in 1917, Lewis enlisted—but first, through the ADL, convinced President Wilson to order the removal of all antisemitic statements from U.S. Army training manuals. Lewis served in the Army infantry and Army intelligence in Germany, France, and England, rising to the rank of major. He stayed in Germany for six months after the end of the war, primarily to care for wounded soldiers and achieve recompense for families of the dead. He was a member of the Disabled American Veterans of America.

In 1919 he returned to the U.S. and resumed his work fighting antisemitism for the ADL in Chicago and other parts of the Midwestern United States. He fought against Henry Ford's rampant antisemitism, as well as that of other prominent antisemites.

Lewis and his family moved to Los Angeles in the late 1920s, where he founded the Los Angeles Jewish Community Committee (later known as the Jewish Federation Council of Greater Los Angeles, Community Relations Committee). From this committee, he launched a major anti-Nazi spy ring and intelligence gathering operation. It received funding from all of the Hollywood studio moguls and worked in cooperation with local and federal authorities. However, assistance from the Los Angeles Police Department was limited due to Chief James Davis' antisemitism and fascist sympathies. The FBI also had few actionable counterintelligence resources and were more focused on combating communism.

The spy ring primarily recruited non-Jewish American WWI veterans, who were especially likely to be recruited to join the Nazi Party; Lewis had particular influence with veterans due to his extensive prior pro bono work for them. They frequented the Alt Heidelberg, gaining intelligence on Los Angeles Nazis there. They also foiled a plot by U.S. Marines to sell weapons to American fascists, and exposed Dietrich Gefken's plan to take over West Coast military armories in 1933. In 1936, Lewis's ring uncovered another fascist plot. Ingram Hughes, founder of the fascist and antisemitic American Nationalist Party, planned a mass lynching of twenty public officials and private citizens in Los Angeles, whom Hughes blamed for the city's "lawlessness, liquor and crime." Hughes also planned to kill Lewis and Mendel Silberberg if they attempted to interfere. He hoped that the lynchings would inspire a nationwide uprising against Jews.

"I'll be glad to see some of those sons of bitches on the end of ropes, and the sooner the better. Each man we hang will be an example of a specific case, and what a representative group it will be, too. Busby Berkeley will look good dangling on a rope’s end, his money won't be any good here. Another of his type will be Tamany [sic], the fellow that had the ill-reputed girl show in Hollywood; and while we're at it we may as well get the two Main Street Jews that own the burlesque theatres there. Leave it to the Jews to live and thrive on the weaknesses of mankind. Judge Willis will make a good example for letting Guy Colvin off as he did. The sooner we get these Jew sons of bitches and their Gentile fronts on ropes the better."

In 1934, Congress investigated West Coast Nazis using the spy ring's evidence, but little of it was ever released to the public.

With help from his assistant Joseph Roos, Lewis' work as spymaster resulted in the successful prosecution of multiple American Nazis before and during World War II, and the prevention of many acts of Nazi sabotage and assassinations on the West Coast of the United States. Lewis served as executive director of the Community Relations Committee for 17 years, after which he returned to his law practice.

== Personal life ==
Lewis married Ruth Lowenberg in 1920, and the couple had two daughters, Rosemary Mazlo (1922–1980) and Claire Read (1928–2015). He died of a heart attack on May 20, 1954 in Pacific Palisades, California.

== Legacy ==
Lewis' personal and professional papers are archived in the Jewish Federation Council of Greater Los Angeles, Community Relations Committee Collection held in the University Library at California State University, Northridge.

== Historical Marker ==
August 20, 2025, Hurley, Wisconsin, Lewis' birthplace, a historical marker recognizing and honoring his accomplishments on behalf of all Americans was dedicated. The marker is sited in front of the Iron County Historical Museum in Hurley.

The marker was donated by the Jewish American Society for Historic Preservation. It was made possible with the significant support of the Iron County Historical Society and the Hurley Community.

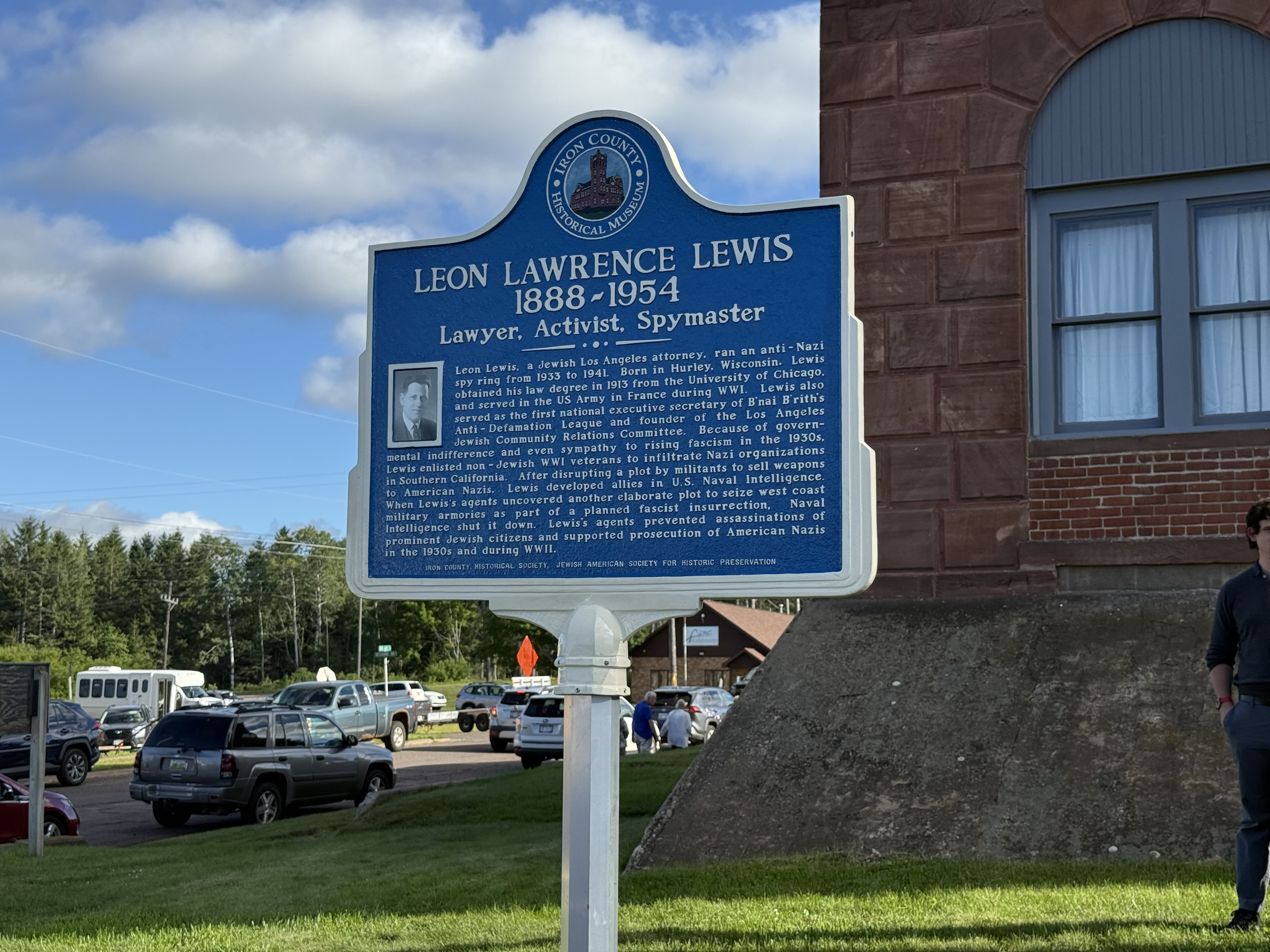
Leon Lewis, Lawyer, Activist, Spy Master

The Text of the marker:

"Leon Lewis, a Jewish Los Angeles attorney, ran an anti-Nazi spy ring from 1933 to 1941. Born in Hurley, Wisconsin, Lewis obtained his law degree in 1913 from the University of Chicago and served in the US Army in France during WWI. Lewis later was the first national executive secretary of B’nai B’rith’s Anti-Defamation League and founder of the Los Angeles Jewish Community Relations Committee. Because of governmental indifference, even sympathy to rising fascism in the 1930s, Lewis enlisted non-Jewish WWI veterans to infiltrate Nazi organizations in Southern California. After disrupting a plot by militants to sell weapons to American Nazis, Lewis developed allies in U.S. Naval Intelligence. Lewis’s agents uncovered another plot to seize west coast military armories as part of a planned fascist insurrection, Naval Intelligence shut it down. Lewis’s agents prevented assassinations of prominent Jewish citizens and supported prosecution of American Nazis in the 1930s and during WWII."

== In popular culture ==
Leon Lewis is featured in the 2022 podcast Rachel Maddow Presents: Ultra for his heroic role in exposing the plot by the Silver Shirts and other heavily armed pro-Nazi groups in the U.S. to overthrow the federal government and install a fascist regime. Lewis is also featured as one of the protagonists in the 2023 historical fiction novel Code Name Edelweiss by Stephanie Landsem, as well as a character (renamed "Ari Lewis") in two novels by Susan Elia MacNeal: The Hollywood Spy (2021) and Mother Daughter Traitor Spy (2022).
