= Cajetan Roos =

Italian painter

Cajetan Roos (1690 in Rome – 1770 in Vienna), was an Italian landscape painter of German descent.

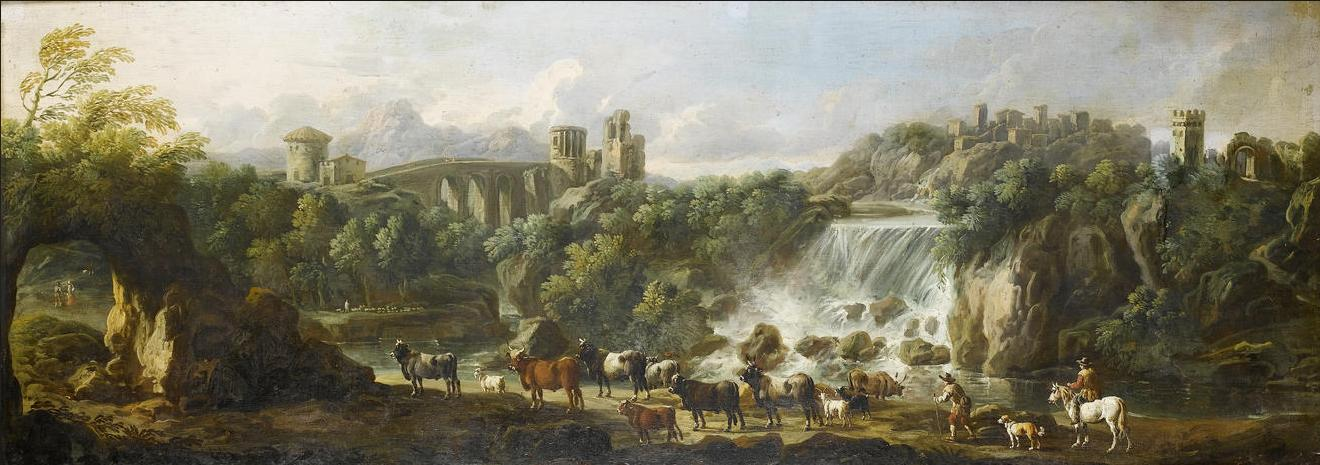
Landscape with view of Tivoli, waterfall, and rocky crag in the shape of a rabbit (left) with cows and their drovers in the foreground.

According to the RKD he was the son and pupil of Philipp Peter Roos. He signed his name "Rosa", "Gaetano Rosa" and "Gaetano de Rosa". He was the father of the painter Joseph Roos. Like his father and grandfather before him, he is known for Italianate landscapes with streams and cows, though after 1743-1744 he painted mostly religious works.

Roos family tree

Johann Heinrich Roos; 1631–1685	Theodor Roos; 1638–1687
Philipp Peter Roos; 1655–1706	Johann Melchior Roos; 1663–1731	Franz Roos; 1672–1715
Jakob Roos; 1682-1707	Cajetan Roos; 1690-1770
Joseph Roos; 1726-1805
