= Philipp Peter Roos =

German painter

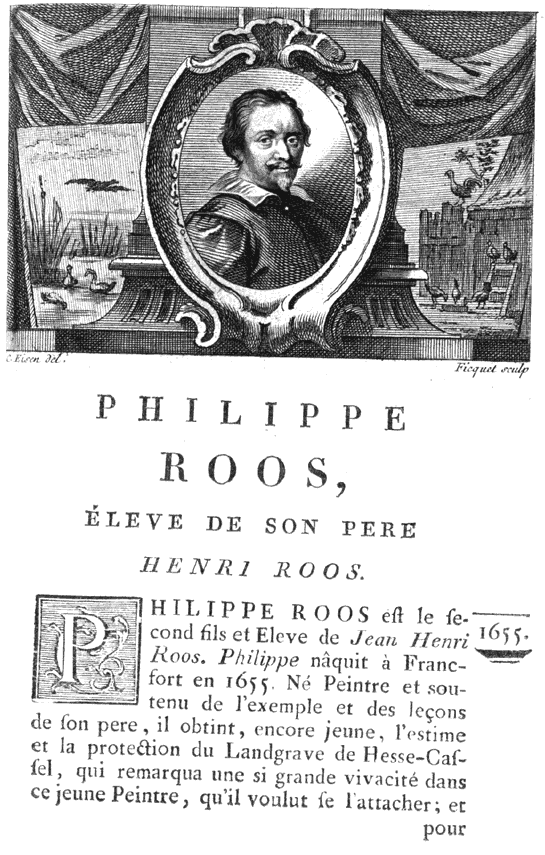
- Philippe Roos in artist biography by Jean-Baptiste Descamps in 1760.
- Born: Filipp; 1655; Frankfurt am Main
- Died: 1706 (aged 54–55); Tivoli, Italy
- Known for: Painting
- Movement: Baroque

Philipp Peter Roos (later surnamed Rosa di Tivoli; 1655–1706) was a German Baroque painter, active in and near Rome from 1677 onward.

== Biography ==
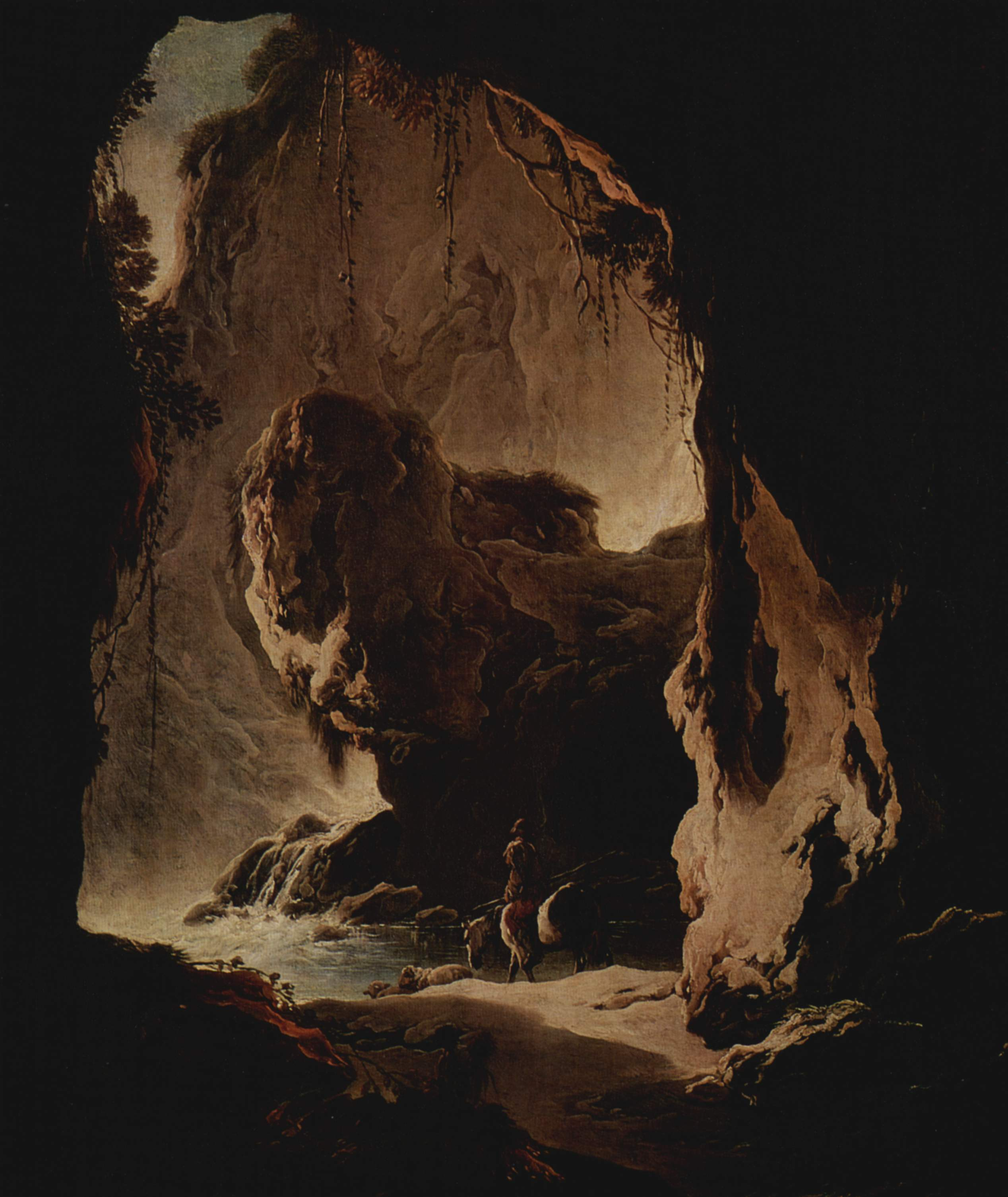
Landscape with Grotto, ca. 1680–1700

He was born in Sankt Goar and learned to paint from his father, the landscape painter Johann Heinrich Roos. He was the brother of the painter Johann Melchior Roos, who briefly worked with him in Italy. As a young man, he painted in the style of his father. He was called to paint for Charles I, Landgrave of Hesse-Kassel, who liked him so much he gave him a sum of money to travel to Rome with, which he did in 1677.

In Rome, he worked often in the studio of Giacinto Brandi, and by 1681 had fallen in love with his daughter, for whom he converted to Catholicism and later married. In 1683, he joined a papal guild of painters, the Congregation of Virtuiosi al Pantheon. In 1684, he acquired a large house on Vicolo del Riserraglio in the Rione San Paolo in Tivoli, near Rome, whence his surname. In Tivoli, they kept a menagerie of various animals so Roos could draw from live poses. This house was called the "Noah's Ark" by their friends. In his Italian style, he painted life-size figures and animals in a broad manner and a heavy brown tone.

In 1691, he moved back to Rome, where he was one of the Bentvueghels painters in the Schildersbent, a grouping of painters from the Low Countries. He had the nickname "Mercurius" because of the rapidity with which he painted; Mercury was the speedy messenger of Zeus. The Schildersbent were often denied official commissions, and had to struggle for a living. Roos often paid for food and lodging with paintings. He earned money making small paintings and sketches for tourists. He died in poverty.

Roos family tree

Johann Heinrich Roos; 1631–1685	Theodor Roos; 1638–1687
Philipp Peter Roos; 1655–1706	Johann Melchior Roos; 1663–1731	Franz Roos; 1672–1715
Jakob Roos; 1682-1707	Cajetan Roos; 1690-1770
Joseph Roos; 1726-1805

== Works ==
Roos became an expert in oxen, sheep, and goats. He specialized in Italianate landscapes decorated with animals.
