= Rossmann =

Rossmann, Roßmann or Rossman may refer to:

== Surname ==
- Amy Y. Rossman (born 1946), American mycologist
- Benjamin Rossman (born 1980), American-Canadian mathematician
- Bubby Rossman (born 1992), American Major League Baseball player
- Claude Rossman (1881–1928), American Major League Baseball player
- Dirk Rossmann (born 1946), German billionaire businessman and founder of Rossmann
- Douglas A. Rossman (1936–2015), U.S. herpetologist
- Edmund Roßmann (1918–2005), German fighter pilot during World War II
- Ernst Dieter Rossmann (born 1951), German politician
- George Rossman (1885–1967), American lawyer and judge
- George R. Rossman (1944–2026), American mineralogist and professor
- Henryk Rossman (1896–1937), Polish lawyer and political activist
- Karl Roßmann (1916–2002), German officer in the Luftwaffe during World War II
- Louis Rossmann (born 1988), American right to repair activist
- Michael Rossmann (1930–2019), German-American physicist
- Mike Rossman (born 1955), American former world champion boxer
- Phillip Rossman (1836–1891), American politician
- Sydney Rossman (born 1995), American professional ice hockey player; see 3rd NWHL All-Star Game
- Tim Rossmann (born 2003), German footballer

== Places ==
- Mount Rossman, Antarctica
- Rossman-Prospect Avenue Historic District, Hudson, New York, USA

== Science and technology ==
- Rossmann fold, a protein structural motif found in proteins
- Rossmann (supercomputer)

== Other uses ==
- Rossmann (company)

== See also ==
- Rosman (disambiguation)
- Rozman, a surname
- Roosmann
