= Roos (disambiguation) =

Roos may also refer to:

== People ==
- Roos (surname)
- Roos Abels (born 1999), Dutch fashion model
- Roos Drost (born 1991), Dutch field hockey player
- Roos Hoogeboom (born 1982), Dutch racing cyclist
- Roos van Montfort (born 1989), Dutch model, January 2014 Playboy centerfold model
- Roos Vermeij (born 1968), Dutch politician
- Roos Vonk (born 1960), Dutch psychologist and columnist

== Places ==
- Roos, a village in East Yorkshire, England

== Sports ==
- Roos, a common short name for the North Melbourne Football Club Kangaroos, an Australian rules football club
- Roos, a common short name for the Triabunna Football Club Kangaroos, an Australian rules football club
- Doonside Roos, an Australian rugby league football club
- Wyong Roos, an Australian rugby league football club
- Lake Macquarie Roos, a Newcastle and Hunter Rugby Union club
- Golden Gate Roos, a United States Australian Football League Australian rules football team based in San Francisco
- Kansas City Roos, the athletic teams of the University of Missouri–Kansas City
- Roos, the short form of the State University of New York at Canton Kangaroos, the school's athletic teams
- Roos, the short form of the Austin College Kangaroos, the school's athletic teams
- Roos Field, Eastern Washington University's football stadium

== Other uses ==
- Roos, a common nickname for kangaroos
- Roos, short for KangaROOS, a brand of shoe with a pocket inside
- Roos, short for Roos Instruments, a manufacturer of Semiconductor automatic test equipment

== See also ==
- Roo (disambiguation)
