= Cornelis de Bie (1621–1664) =

Dutch Golden Age painter

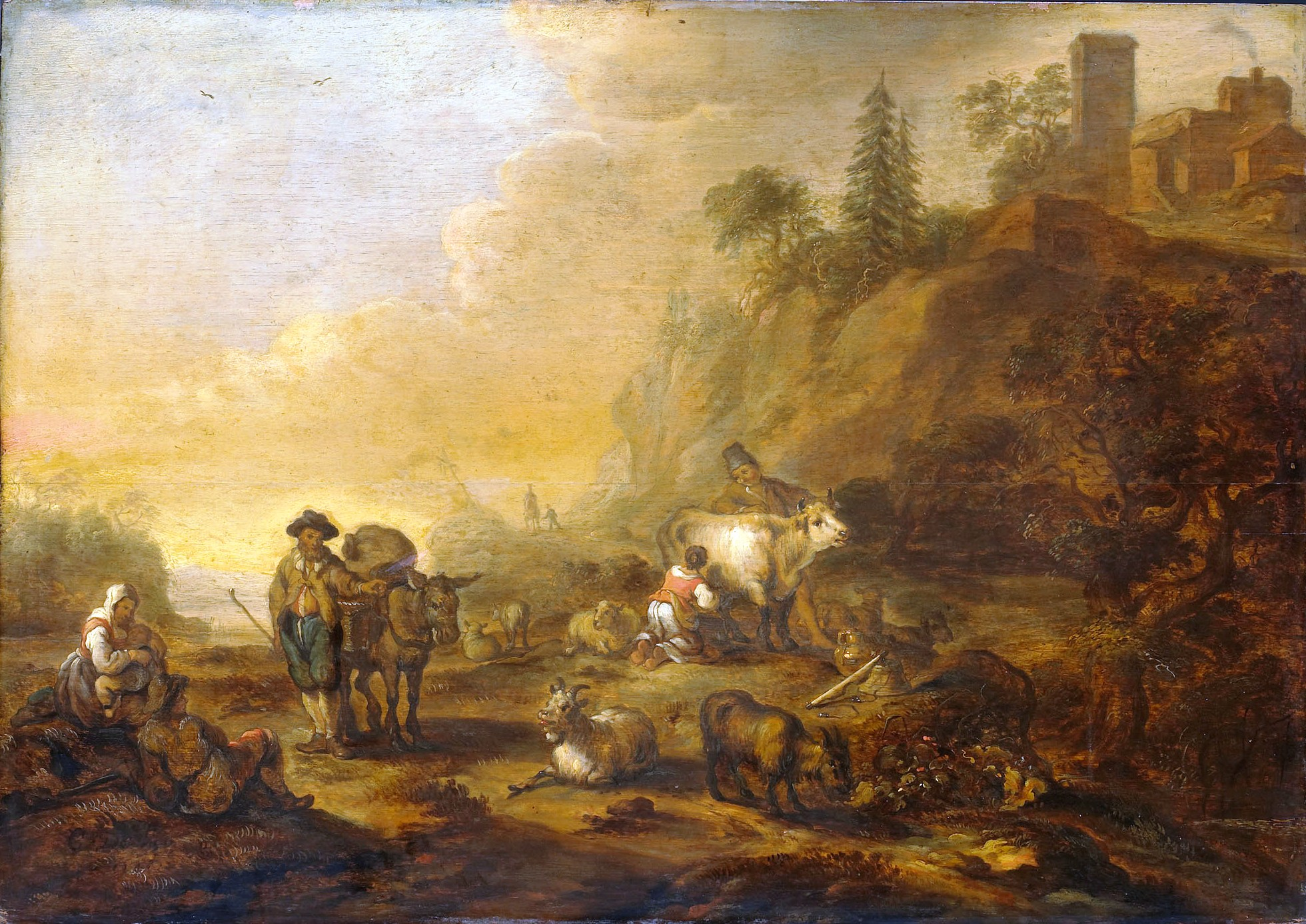
Landscape with figures, 1648

Cornelis de Bie (c. 1621 – 1664), was a Dutch Golden Age painter.

== Biography ==
His birth date and place are not known but his father was reported in Amsterdam. He should not be confused with the 17th century Flemish author Cornelis de Bie whose chief work is the volume of artist biographies entitled Het Gulden Cabinet.

It is not clear who his teacher was. Frans Hals has been mentioned as a possibility but this is not generally accepted and he may have trained in Amsterdam. He referred to himself a painter as early as 1642 and married in 1649. He acquired citizenship of Amsterdam in 1650.

He was a cousin of Hendrick ten Oever, whom he taught along with the German brothers Johann Heinrich and Theodor Roos.

He died in Amsterdam.

== Work ==
He is mainly known for italianate landscapes. He was, however, a versatile painter, and also painted genre scenes, biblical and mythological subjects as well as typical indoor scenes such as card players.

== Links ==
- 1 artwork by or after Cornelis de Bie at the Art UK site
- Cornelis de Bie on Artnet
