= Rosman =

Rosman may refer to:

== Places ==
- Rosman, North Carolina, United States

== People ==
Given name

- Rosman Abdullah, Singaporean drug trafficker
- Rosman García (1979–2011), Venezuelan relief pitcher in Major League Baseball
- Rosman Sulaiman (born 1982), Singaporean soccer player

Surname

- Alice Grant Rosman (1882–1961), Australian novelist
- Carl Rosman (born 1971), Australian clarinettist
- Mackenzie Rosman (born 1989), American actress and singer
- Mark Rosman (born 1957), American film director, television director and screenwriter
- Katherine Rosman (born 1972), American journalist
- Stacey Rosman (born 1981), Australian netball player

== Other ==
- Rosman Research Station
- Rosman Ferries, a privately owned ferry operator on Sydney Harbour

== See also ==
- Rossmann (disambiguation) (including Roßmann or Rossman)
- Rozman
- Roosmann
