= Johann Melchior Roos =

German Baroque painter

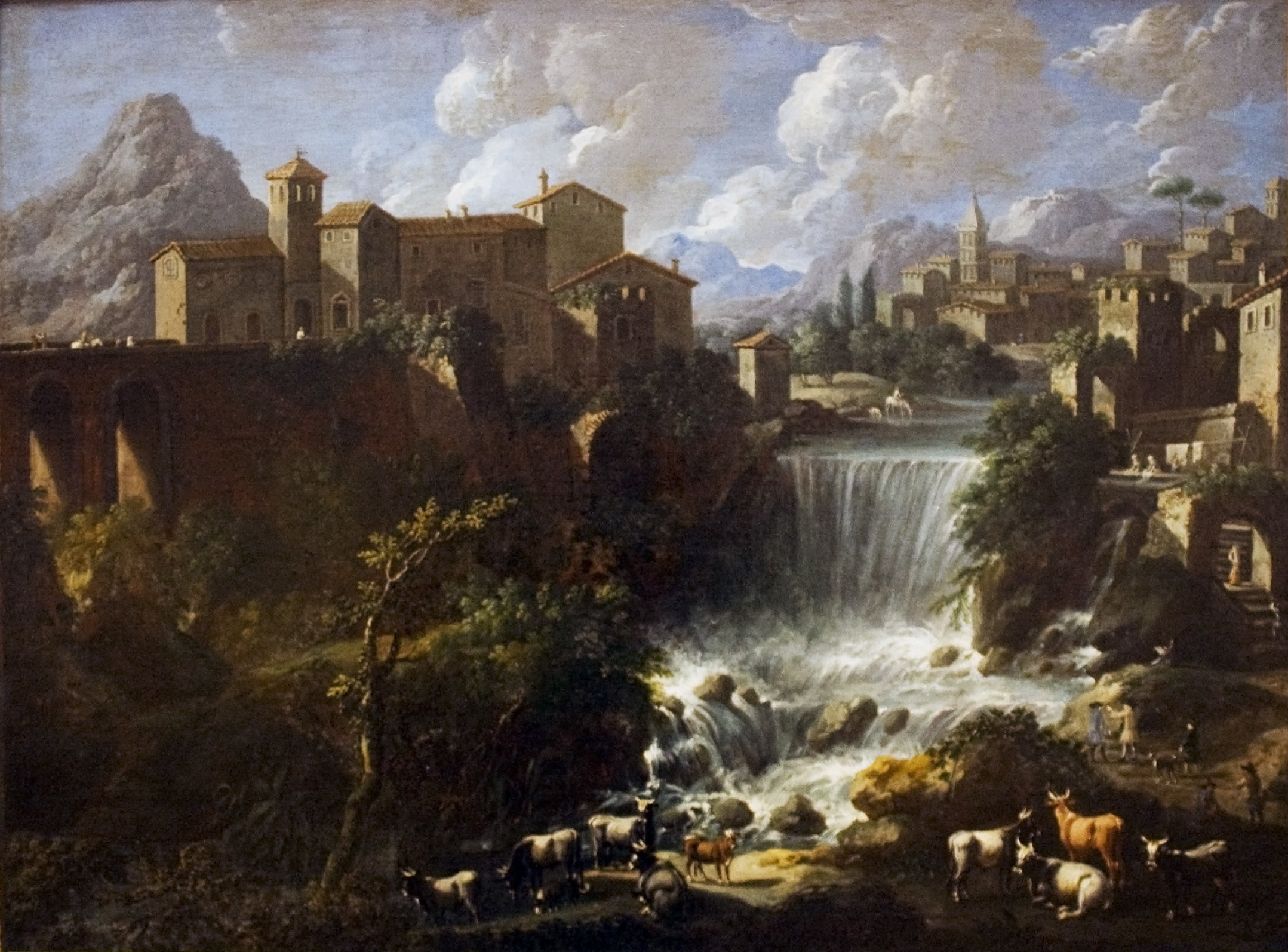
Waterfall at Tivoli

Johann Melchior Roos (December 27, 1663 – 1731) was a German Baroque painter.

== Biography ==
According to the RKD He was born in Heidelberg and learned to paint from his father, the landscape painter Johann Heinrich Roos. In 1682-1685 he studied at the drawing academy of the Confrerie Pictura in the Hague, and in 1686 he travelled to Rome where he worked with his brother Philipp Peter Roos (Rosa di Tivoli) in Italy. He is known for Italianate landscapes with animals and portraits. He died in 1731 in Braunschweig.

Roos family tree

Johann Heinrich Roos; 1631–1685	Theodor Roos; 1638–1687
Philipp Peter Roos; 1655–1706	Johann Melchior Roos; 1663–1731	Franz Roos; 1672–1715
Jakob Roos; 1682-1707	Cajetan Roos; 1690-1770
Joseph Roos; 1726-1805
