= Guilliam du Gardijn =

Dutch painter

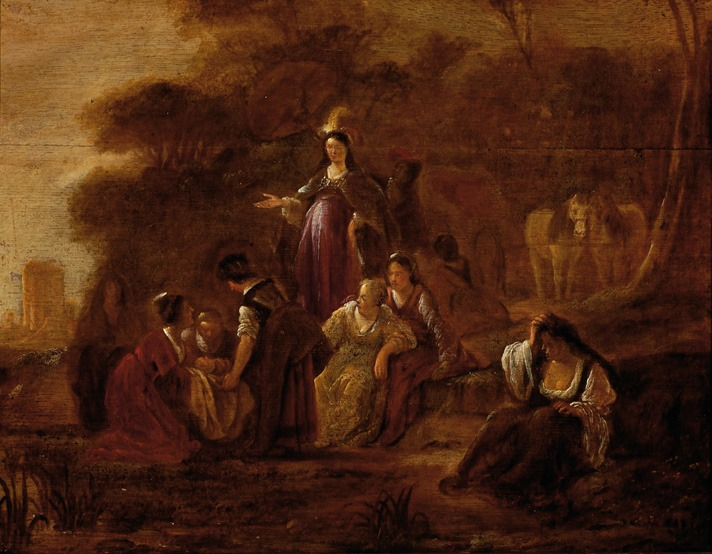
Finding Moses, whereabouts unknown

Guilliam du Gardijn (1595/1596–1647/1657) was a Dutch Golden Age landscape painter.

== Life and work ==
Gardijn was born in Cologne. According to the RKD he was the teacher of Johann Heinrich Roos who lived with him in his Amsterdam atelier in 1647. He probably knew the Roos family as part of a German expat community in Amsterdam that had fled the Thirty Years War. He painted Italianate landscapes with ruins, some of which are biblical scenes, and some of which have trees that appear human. A few of these are in the possession of the Stedelijk Museum Alkmaar, and one is in the Rijksmuseum in Amsterdam. He also made a series of drawings of Turkish figures after the 16th century Flemish painter and draughtsman Pieter Coecke van Aelst. He died in Amsterdam.
