= Rosalie Roos Wiener =

- Rosalie Roos
- Self-portrait of Rosalie Roos Wiener (ca. 1938)
- Born: August 17, 1899; Opelousas, Louisiana
- Died: December 1982 (aged 83); New Orleans, Louisiana
- Education: Newcomb College
- Known for: Metalwork; Jewelry
- Spouse: A.L. Wiener

Rosalie Roos Wiener (1899–1982) was an art student and an artist at Newcomb College from 1923 until the late 1930s. She specialized in metalwork and jewelry making, working with silver, copper, brass, tin, and gold.

== Early life, education, and career ==
Wiener studied art at Newcomb College in New Orleans, primarily known for its arts education program and the Newcomb Pottery enterprise.

As an art student at Newcomb, Wiener studied drawing, painting and design. She was one of a select few students who continued to become "craftsmen" with Newcomb, producing items for sale and earning a commission on their work. Although the Newcomb enterprise is best known for pottery, Wiener primarily produced metalwork, becoming a master silverworker. She also produced decorative metalwork and jewelry using copper, brass, tin and gold.

== Legacy ==
Roos married Col. Abraham Lehman "Lee" Wiener, who worked for Schenley Distillery in New Orleans. They lived together in Uptown New Orleans until his death in 1946. Rosalie Wiener then lived with her daughter, Corinne Wiener, in New Orleans, until her death in 1983.

Many of her silver pieces and numerous other Newcomb-related art pieces created by Wiener were revealed following her daughter's death and were purchased at auction by the Newcomb Art Gallery.
