= Rew (surname) =

Rew is a surname and may refer to:

- Charles Rew (1898–1972), British rower
- Henry Rew (1906–1940), English rugby union footballer
- James Rew (born 2004), English cricketer
- Kate Rew (born 1969), English journalist and author
- Keynan Rew (born 2003), Australian speedway rider
- Kim Rew (born 1975), South African competitive sailor
- Kimberley Rew (born 1951), English singer-songwriter
- Quentin Rew (born 1984), New Zealand race walker
- R. Henry Rew (1858–1929), British agricultural statistician
- Thomas Rew (1922–2025), United States Air Force major general
- Thomas Rew (cricketer) (born 2007), English cricketer
