= Rue, Virginia =

Unincorporated community in Virginia, United States

Coordinates: 37°47′14″N 75°36′22″W

Rue is an unincorporated community in Accomack County, Virginia, United States.
