= Céline Roos =

French chess player (1953–2021)

Personal information
- Born: Céline Clairette Roos; 22 December 1953 Strasbourg, France
- Died: 20 April 2021 (aged 67) Strasbourg, France

Chess career
- Country: Canada (until 1989); France (after 1989)
- Title: Woman International Master (1985)
- Peak rating: 2182 (January 2001)

Céline Clairette Roos (22 December 1953 – 20 April 2021) was a French chess player who held the FIDE title of Woman International Master (WIM).

== Biography ==
Roos came from a French chess family. Her father Michel Roos (1932–2002) won the French Chess Championship in 1964; this success was repeated by her brother Louis in 1977. Her mother Jacqueline Roos (died 2016) was International Correspondence Chess Grandmaster (2000). Her brothers Jean-Luc (born 1955), Louis (born 1957), and Daniël (born 1959) are International Masters (IM).

She participated in many international chess tournaments. In 1990, Roos had her greatest success at the International Women's Chess Tournament in Oisterwijk, when she shared second place.

Roos played for Canada in the Women's Chess Olympiads:

- In 1980, at second board in the 9th Chess Olympiad (women) in Valletta (+5, =3, -4),
- In 1982, at second board in the 10th Chess Olympiad (women) in Lucerne (+4, =5, -3),
- In 1984, at second board in the 26th Chess Olympiad (women) in Thessaloniki (+7, =5, -1) and won individual gold medal,
- In 1988, at second board in the 28th Chess Olympiad (women) in Thessaloniki (+8, =1, -3).

In 1985, she earned the FIDE Woman International Master (WIM) title.

Roos died on 20 April 2021, at the age of 67, after a brief illness.
