= Theodor Roos =

Dutch painter

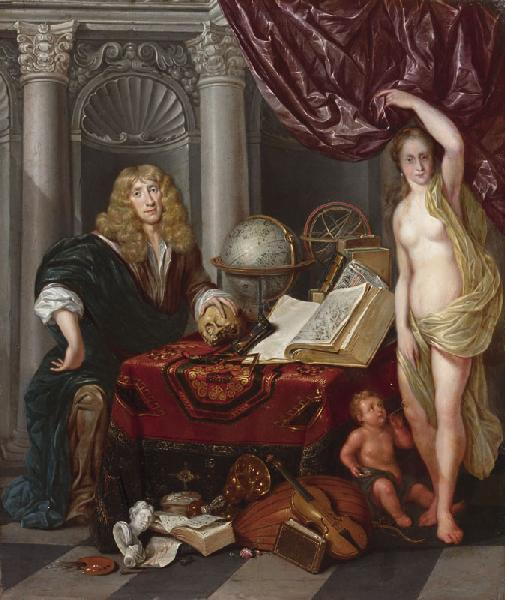
- Theodor Roos self-portrait, 1673
- Born: Johann Heinrich Roos; 1638; Wesel
- Died: 1698 (aged 59–60); Frankfurt
- Known for: Painting
- Movement: Baroque

Theodor Roos (1638–1698) was a German Baroque painter of historical scenes.

== Biography ==
He was born in Wesel. His family left their home in the Palatinate c. 1637, fleeing the Thirty Years War, and moved to Amsterdam around 1640. There, from 1647 to 1651, Roos trained alongside his brother Johann Heinrich Roos in history painting with Guilliam Dujardin (1597–after 1647), in landscape with Cornelis de Bie and in portraiture with Barent Graat.

The brothers returned with the rest of the family to Germany in 1653, where they worked for a monastery in Mainz. When Johann left, Theodor Roos won a commission to paint the civic guard in Mannheim. The painting was displayed in the city hall, and won him the favor of Charles I Louis, Elector Palatine, whose wedding portraits he painted in return for a golden necklace with a commemorative coin. Thereafter he painted in Strassbourg, Hof van Velde, van Birkenfelt, Bade, Hanau, and Hof van Wirtenburg. In Strassbourg he was granted amnesty when the city was taken by the French, because of his long history of painting military heroes.

== Family tree ==
Roos family tree

Johann Heinrich Roos; 1631–1685 | Theodor Roos; 1638–1687
Philipp Peter Roos; 1655–1706 | Johann Melchior Roos; 1663–1731 | Franz Roos; 1672–1715
Jakob Roos; 1682-1707 | Cajetan Roos; 1690-1770
Joseph Roos; 1726-1805
