= Rou =

Rou or ROU may refer to:

- Rapid Offensive Unit, fictional starship class in the Culture series
- Romania, ISO 3-letter country code ROU
- Aleksandr Rou, Soviet film director
- Air Canada Rouge, ICAO airline code ROU
- Uruguay, initialism for República Oriental del Uruguay and VRI code ROU
- Rourkela Junction railway station (station code: ROU) in Odisha, India
