= Rozman =

Rozman is a both a given name and surname. Notable people with the surname include:

- Andrej Rozman (born 1955), Slovenian poet
- Franc Rozman (nom de guerre Stane), (1911–1944), Slovenian Yugoslav Partisan of World War II
- Gilbert Rozman (born 1943), American sociologist
- Gregorij Rožman (1883–1959), Bishop of Ljubljana
- Ivana Rožman (born 1989), Macedonian athlete
- Levy Rozman (born 1995), known online as GothamChess, American chess coach and chess International Master
- Maria Rozman (born 1970), Spanish news director
- Matjaž Rozman (born 1987), Slovenian soccer player
- Milica Rožman (born 1932), Slovenian-Yugoslavian gymnast
- Rok Rozman (born 1988), Slovenian rower
- Simon Rožman (born 1983), Slovenian football manager
- Smiljan Rozman (1927–2007), Slovenian writer
- Sonja Rožman (1934–2010), Slovenian gymnast
- Yuval Rozman (born 1984), Israeli actor
- Rozman Jusoh (1971–1996), Malaysian drug trafficker

== See also ==
- Rosman (disambiguation)
- Rossmann (disambiguation)
