= Rue Protzer =

German jazz guitarist and composer (born 1966)

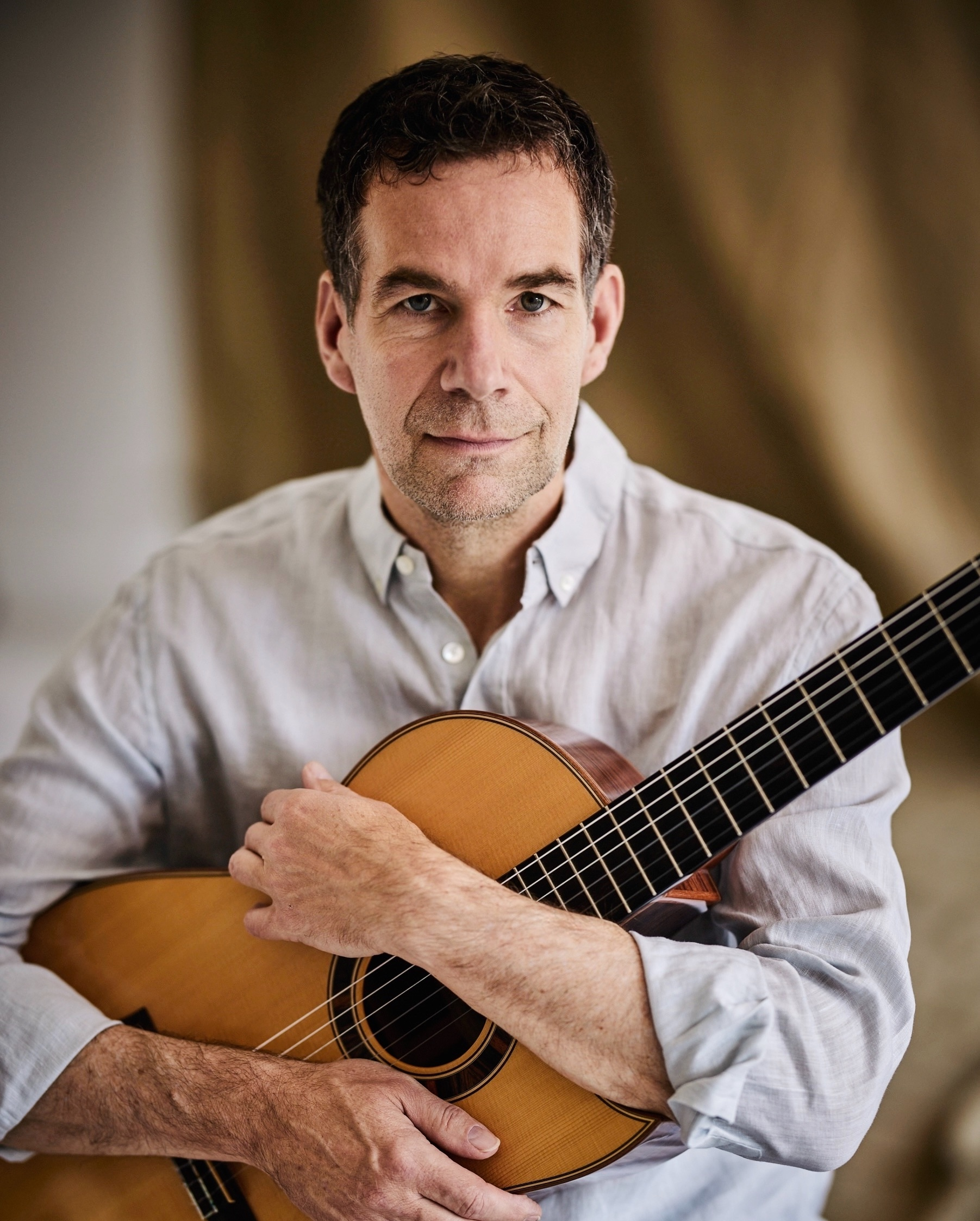
Rue Protzer, 2025

Rue Protzer (born 1966 in Stuttgart, Germany) is a German guitarist, composer, author, and music producer. He is the leader of the Rue de Paris group. This project has involved artists such as Randy Brecker, Ack van Rooyen, Lee Konitz, Adam Nussbaum or Marc Johnson.

== Biography ==
=== Early years and education ===
Rue Protzer grew up in Nuremberg, where he won his first composition competition at the age of 15. After graduating from high school, he initially worked as a session musician. From 1987 to 1994 he studied classical guitar, composition and conducting at the Nuremberg Conservatory. After studying with Pat Metheny, Joe Beck, Gene Bertoncini and Peter O’Mara, he turned to jazz.

=== Career ===
Protzer's debut album with Rue de Paris was released in 2005 under the title Quiet Motion by Sony Classical and received a very positive feedback from the music press. Other members of the group were Ack van Rooyen, Adam Nussbaum, Thomas Rückert and John Goldsby.

The second Rue de Paris album New York Slow (with Randy Brecker and Lee Konitz, among others) was released in 2007 by Sony Classical.

In 2009 the group finally released Trois, a third album with the regular line-up Protzer, Nussbaum, Rückert and bassist Marc Johnson. In addition, the singer Cécile Verny and the trumpet player Julian Wasserfuhr take part in some of the tracks. The German music magazine Stereoplay selected the album Trois as third of the ten best jazz CDs of this year.

In 2010 he performed his composition Xanivia with the Metropole Orkest. In 2012 the world premiere of The Pirt Trip for orchestra and guitar took place in the Nuremberg Tafelhalle.

For the album One Note Story, which was released in 2013, Protzer used "a kind of all-star band of young German jazz".

For the Nuremberg city newspaper Plärrer (Nr. 11, November 2013), the album marks "an elegant but decisive turn-around to an eminently rhythmic jazz language" in which many pieces are based on odd meters.

The stylistic change is underlined by the use of a Fender Stratocaster, whose specific sound "dominates" the album; According to Protzer, it played a decisive role in the conception of the album: “The effect of a theme always depends on the sound of the instrument. So it makes sense to know exactly which instrument you are composing for."

In 2017, Rue Protzer wrote the electric guitar school for children Jimmy! Der Gitarren-Chef, illustrated by the graphic artist Selina Peterson, of which three volumes have been published by the German Dux-Verlag.

In 2025, Protzer released his first solo guitar album Waves of Change on his own label Guitar Nova.

Rue Protzer is guitarist and band leader of the live band 4 at the club.

== Discography ==
=== As leader ===
- Rue de Paris – Quiet Motion (Sony Classical/Sony BMG) with Adam Nussbaum, John Goldsby, Thomas Rückert, Ack van Rooyen (2005)
- Rue de Paris – New York Slow (Sony Classical/Sony BMG) with Randy Brecker, Lee Konitz, Adam Nussbaum, Jay Anderson, Thomas Rückert (2007)
- Rue de Paris – Trois (Intuition) with Adam Nussbaum, Thomas Rückert, Marc Johnson, Cecile Verny, Julian Wasserfuhr (2009)
- Rue Protzer – One Note Story (Intuition) with Patrick Scales, Sebastian Studnitzky, Lutz Häfner, Jesse Milliner, Jürgen Neudert, Christian Lettner (2013)
- Rue Protzer – Waves of Change (Guitar Nova) – solo guitar (2025)

== Books ==
- 2017: Jimmy! der Gitarrenchef Band 1. E-Gitarrenlehrbuch für Kinder. Dux-Verlag.
- 2017: Jimmy! der Gitarrenchef Band 2. E-Gitarrenlehrbuch für Kinder. Dux-Verlag.
- 2017: Jimmy! Der Gitarren-Chef – Weihnachtslieder. E-Gitarrenlehrbuch für Kinder. Dux-Verlag.
- 2026: Jimmy und die Band ohne Namen. Novel for young readers. VNP Verlag.
