= Rewrite =

Rewrite and rewriting may refer to:

- Script doctoring, revisions to an existing script for stage and screen productions
- Rewriting, methods for replacing elements of a formula with other suitable expressions, in mathematics, computer science, and logic, such as:
  - Graph rewriting, technique of creating a new graph out of an original graph algorithmically
  - Sender Rewriting Scheme, a scheme for rewriting the envelope sender address of an email message
  - String rewriting, a rewriting system over strings from an alphabet
- Rewrite (programming), the act or result of writing new source code to replace an existing computer program
- Rewrite man, a journalist that crafts stories based on information reported by others
- Rewrite (video game), a 2011 Japanese visual novel by Key
- The Rewrite, a 2014 American romantic comedy film

== Music ==
- "Rewrite" (song), 2004 single by Asian Kung-Fu Generation
- "Rewrite", 2011 song by Paul Simon from So Beautiful or So What
- "Rewrite", 2004 song by Sia from Colour the Small One

== See also ==
- Tax Law Rewrite Project, a major effort to re-write the entire tax legislation of the United Kingdom
- Blackwhite, or Rewriting the past, according to George Orwell's 1984
- Rewrite engine, webserver component that performs rewriting on URLs
- Rewrite history, the re-interpretation of a historical account
