= Johann Heinrich Roos =

German painter

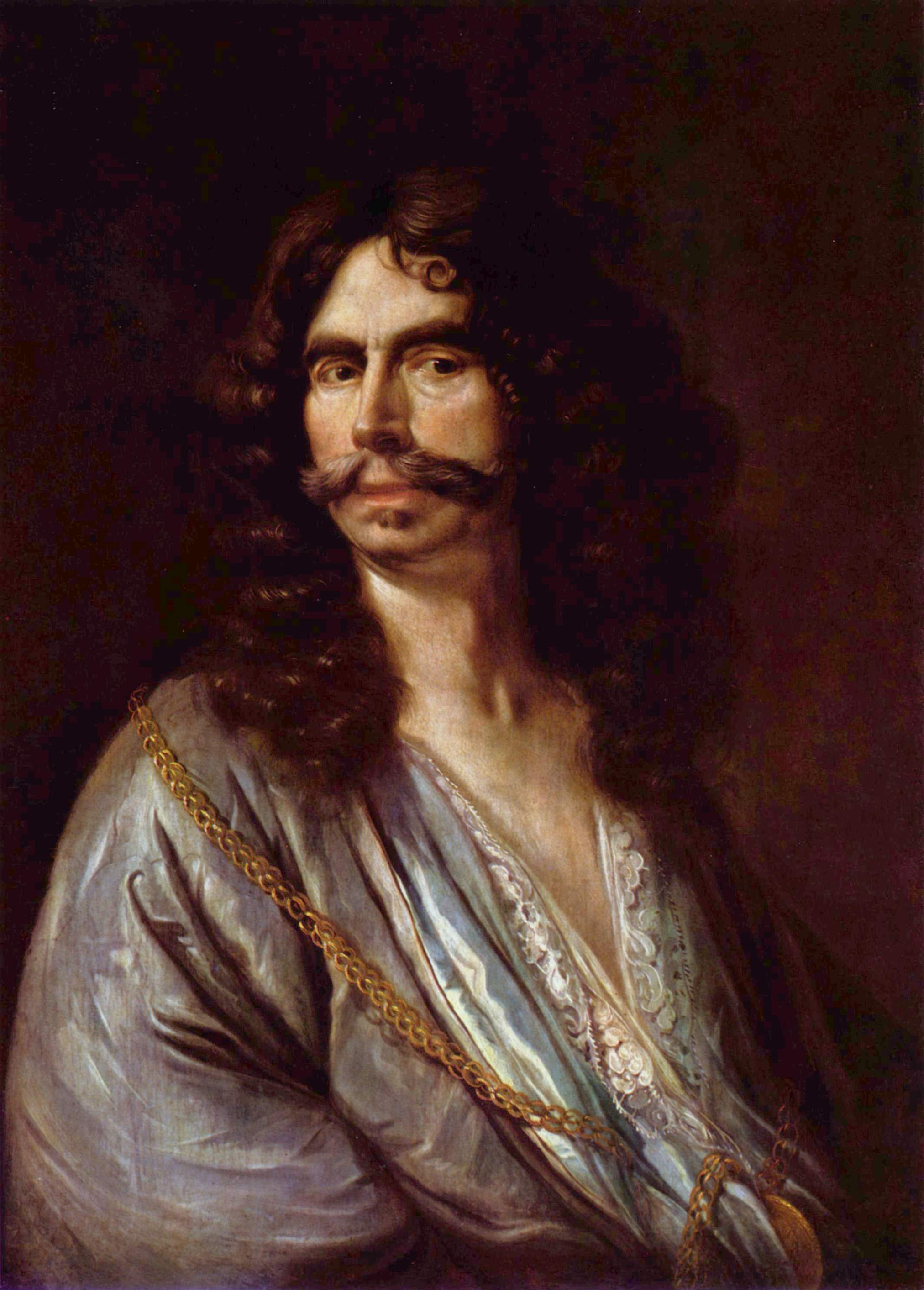
- Self-portrait, 1682
- Born: 29 September 1631; Otterberg
- Died: 3 October 1685 (aged 54); Frankfurt
- Known for: Painting
- Movement: Baroque

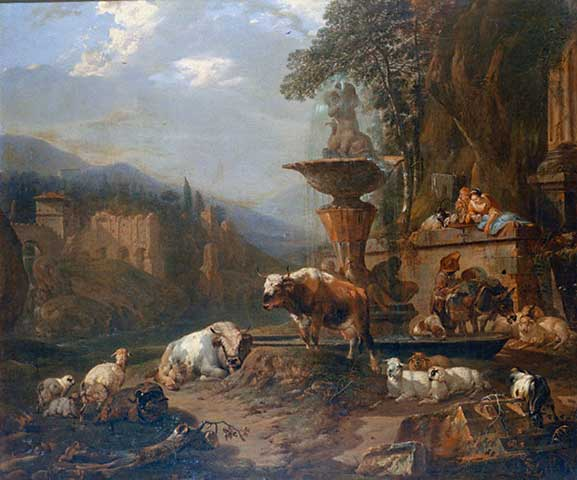
Italianate landscape

Johann Heinrich Roos (29 September 1631 – 3 October 1685) was a German Baroque era landscape painter and etcher.

== Biography ==
Roos was born in Otterberg, a town in the Palatinate in 1631. His family had emigrated to Amsterdam due to the Thirty Years' War in 1640. He trained with Guilliam du Gardijn, Cornelis de Bie and Barent Graat, but the landscape painters Nicolaes Berchem and Karel Dujardin were more of an influence on him. In 1653 the Roos family returned to Germany, where Johann and his brother Theodor Roos worked together on a commission for a cloister in Mainz.

Between 1654 and 1659, Johann worked for Ernst, Landgrave of Hesse-Rheinfels (son of Maurice, lived 1623–1693), where he painted a portrait of A Prince (1654, Heidelberg, Kurpfälzisches Museum) and religious scenes. In 1664 he was invited to paint at the court of Charles I Louis, Elector Palatine. Due to unsatisfactory working conditions, he moved with his family to Frankfurt in 1667 and was very successful, but lost everything in a fire in 1685. He died trying to save his belongings. Four sons and a daughter survived to become good painters.

Though not registered as a pupil of Rembrandt, he made a copy of a painting by Rembrandt that he saw presumably in Amsterdam while he trained there from 1647 to 1653:

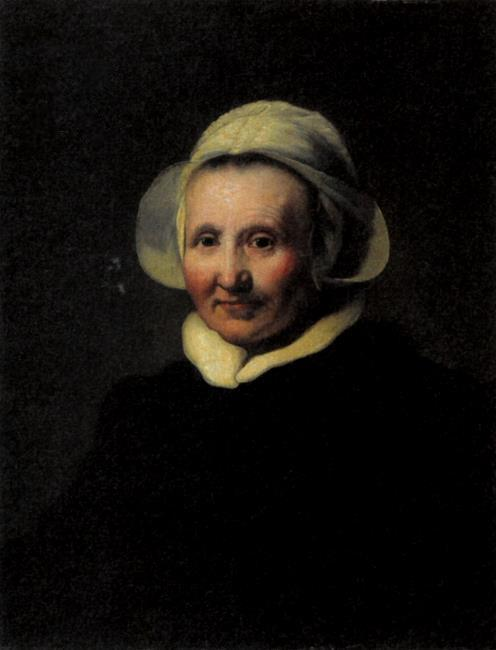
by Roos

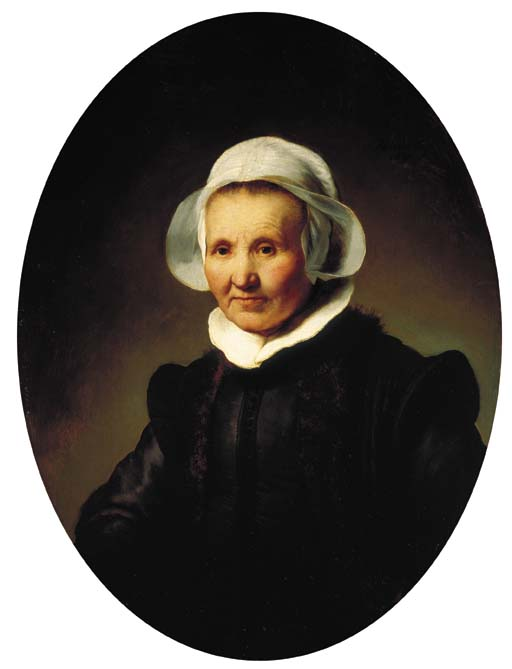
by Rembrandt

== Works ==
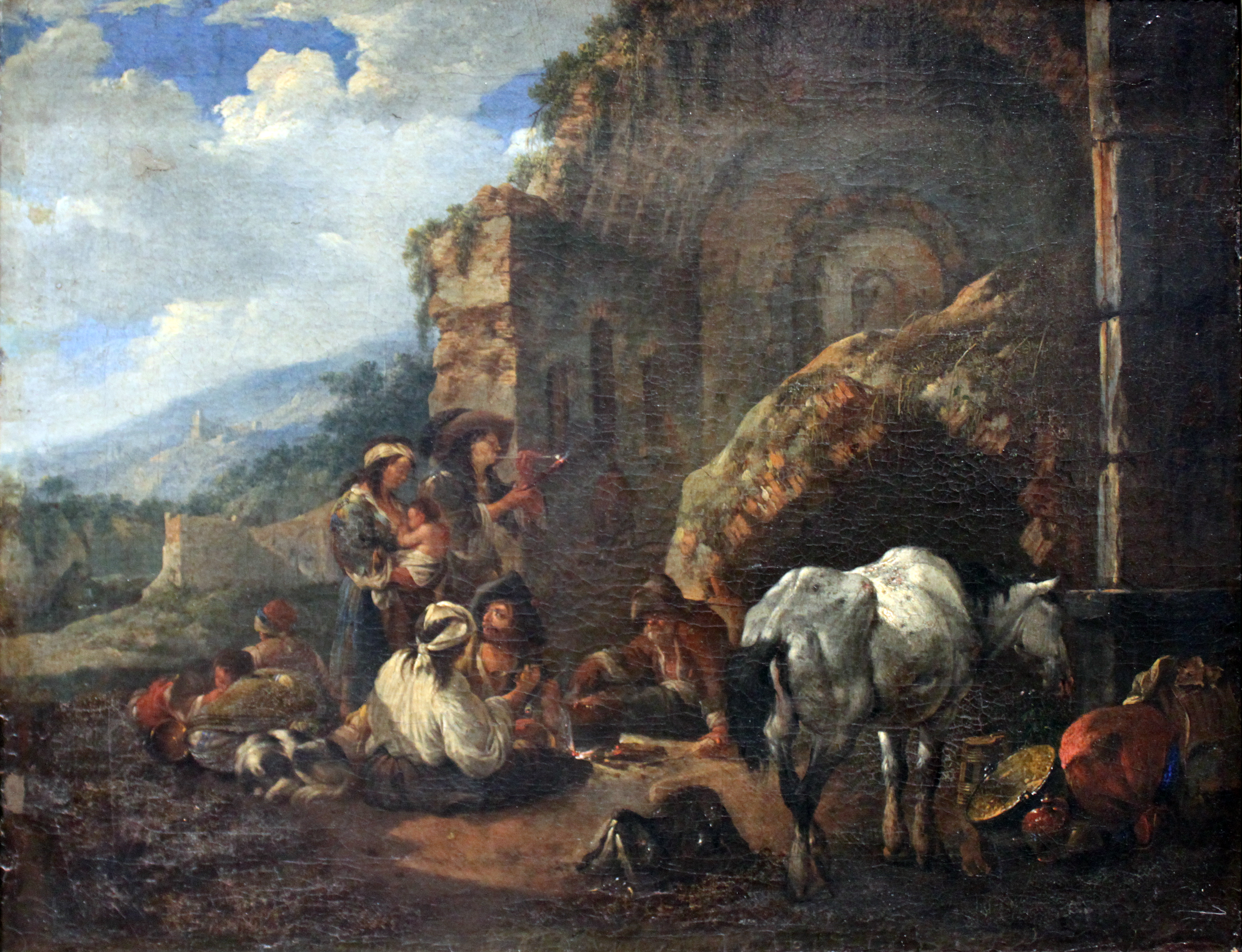
Gypsy Camp in a Roman Ruin, 1671, Städelsches Kunstinstitut

Roos specialized in pastoral idylls, idealized landscapes with ancient ruins. He found inspiration in engravings. These pastoral scenes represent the longing of Roos for harmony between men and animals with nature. Among biblical, historical and genre scenes, Roos preferred subjects involving animals: the shepherds of the nativity, Venus and Adonis. Roos was also one of the finest German portrait painters of his time. He painted princes, noble ladies and officers, but also Frankfurt middle classes. Roos worked too from many individual drawings (Albertina, Vienna), mostly of domestic animals. He intensified the individuality of each species.

== Gallery of animals (ca. 1668–1670) ==
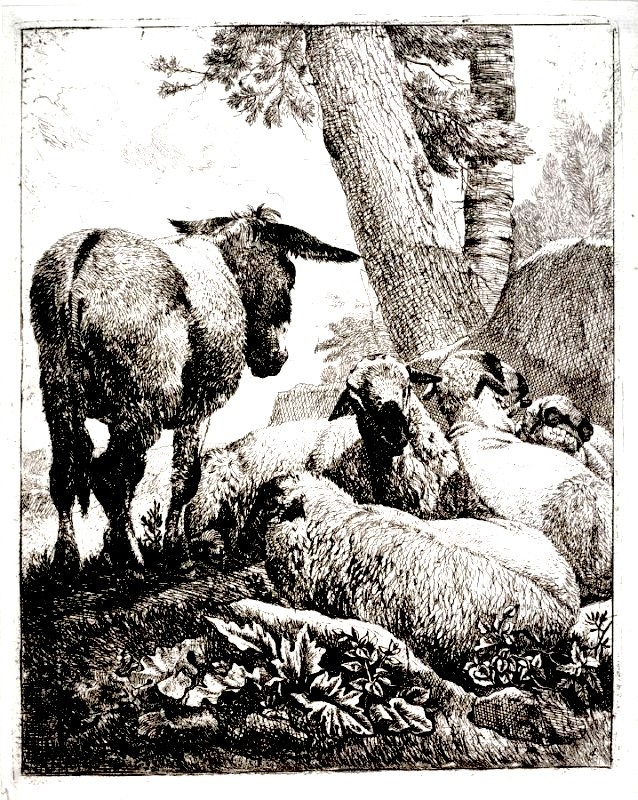

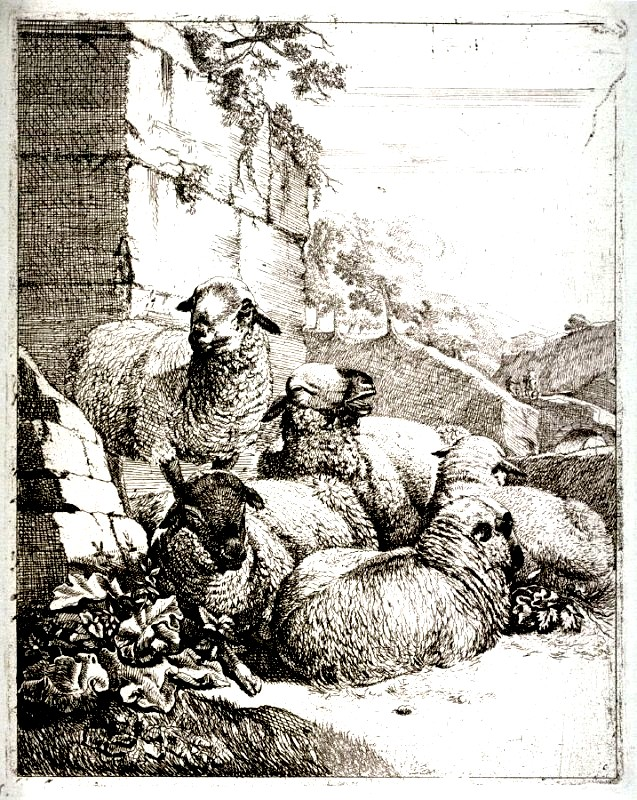

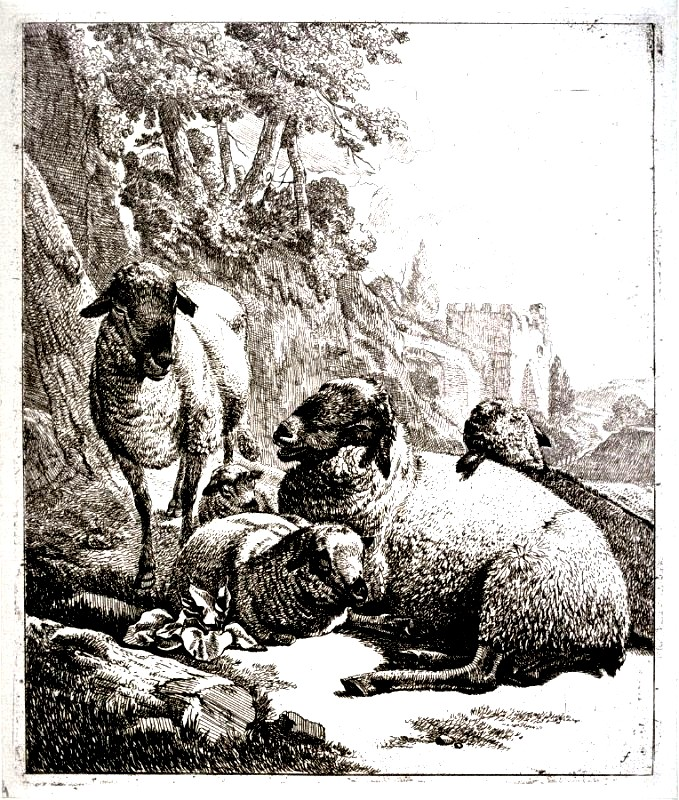

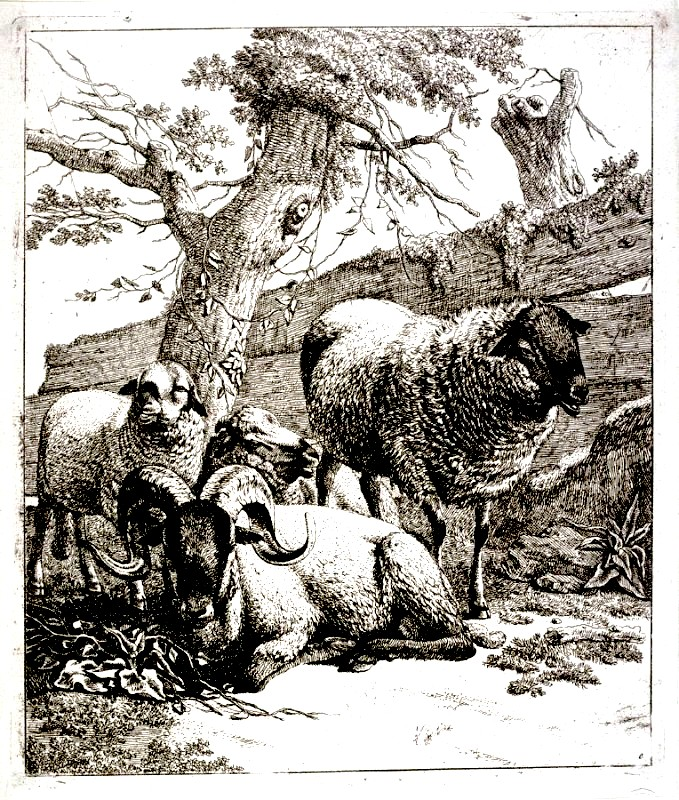

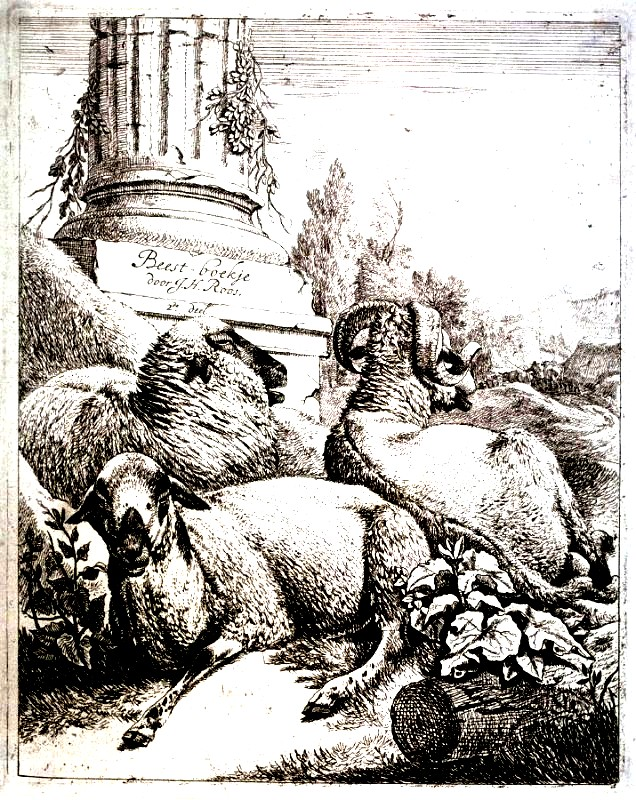

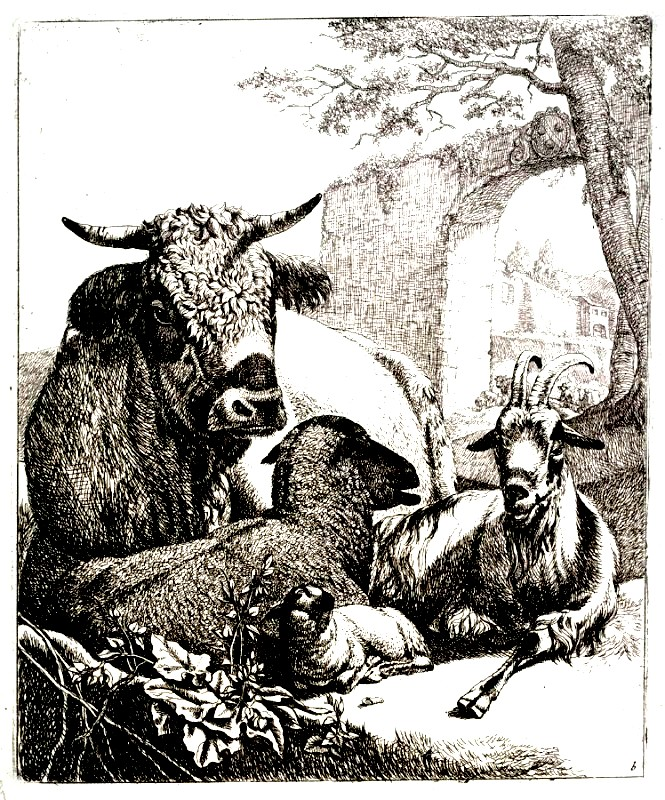

== Public collections ==
Roos is represented in the following collections : Kunsthistorisches Museum, Vienna; Städelsches Kunstinstitut, Frankfurt; Allen Memorial Art Museum, Oberlin, Ohio; Fine Arts Museum of San Francisco; Detroit Institute of Arts, Michigan; Dulwich Picture Gallery, London; Crocker Art Museum, California; Indianapolis Museum of Art, Indiana; Dallas Museum of Art, Texas; Palazzo Bianco, Genoa, amongst others.

== Family ==
His sons Philipp Peter Roos (Rosa di Tivoli) and Johann Melchior Roos were also renowned painters. Their works are represented in museums at Frankfurt, Cologne, Dessau, Darmstadt and Stuttgart.

Roos family tree

Johann Heinrich Roos; 1631–1685	Theodor Roos; 1638–1687
Philipp Peter Roos; 1655–1706	Johann Melchior Roos; 1663–1731	Franz Roos; 1672–1715
Jakob Roos; 1682-1707	Cajetan Roos; 1690-1770
Joseph Roos; 1726-1805
