= Michel Roos =

French chess player

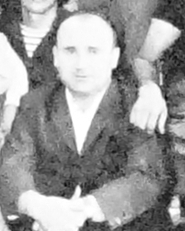
- Roos in 1964

Personal information
- Full name: Michel Adolphe Roos
- Born: 27 August 1932 Strasbourg, France
- Died: 7 September 2002 (aged 70) Strasbourg, France

Chess career
- Country: France
- FIDE rating: 2093 (October 2001)
- Peak rating: 2225 (January 1982)

Michel Adolphe Roos (27 August 1932 – 7 September 2002) was a French chess player and doctor. He won the French Chess Championship in 1964 and the French Correspondence Chess Championship in 1957.

== Biography ==
Roos received a medical degree and was a professor at University of Strasbourg in Strasbourg, specializing in histology. He founded the biostatistics laboratory at the University of Strasbourg and for some time he was vice president of the University.

He started playing chess in Strasbourg Chess Club under the leadership of aston Wolf (bronze medalist of the 1956 French Chess Championship). In the 1970-1980s he was the chairman of the club. Due to his main job, Roos played mainly in domestic French competitions or in correspondence chess tournaments. He took part in the individual French Chess Championship finals many times and won five medals: gold (1964), silver (1958) and three bronze (1966, 1971, 1981). In 1957, Roos won the French Correspondence Chess Championship.

Roos played for France in the World Student Team Chess Championship:

- In 1959, at second board in the 6th World Student Team Chess Championship in Budapest (+3, =4, -6).

He is the founder of a whole chess dynasty. His wife Jacqueline Roos (died 2016) was an International Correspondence Chess Grandmaster (2000), his daughter Céline (1953–2021) was a Woman International Master (WIM), and his sons Jean-Luc (born 1955), Louis (born 1957), and Daniël (born 1959) are International Masters (IM).
