= Eva Roos =

Eva Roos, née Vedder (1872–1956) was an artist and illustrator, mainly of children's books. She is believed to have lived and worked in the Hampstead area of London in the late 19th and early 20th centuries.

Books illustrated by Roos include:

- East Lynne by Mrs Henry Wood published 1900s (?) by Collins, London. Features 8 illustrations by Eva Roos.
- Helen's Babies by John Habberton. First published by Grant Richards, London 1911. Features sixty illustrations by Eva Roos. Republished in 1919 by Chatto & Windus.
- The Emperor's Medal, a story for children by D. S. Batley, published by T. C. & E. C. Jack, London, 1907. Features six illustrations by Eva Roos.
- The Water Babies by Charles Kingsley. Published in 1908 edition.
- The Happy go luckies by M. H. Legh. Published in 1905.
- The Noisy Years by Jessie Dearmer. Published in 1902.

Roos also exhibited five works in the Royal Academy of Arts.
