= Louis Roos =

French chess player (born 1957)

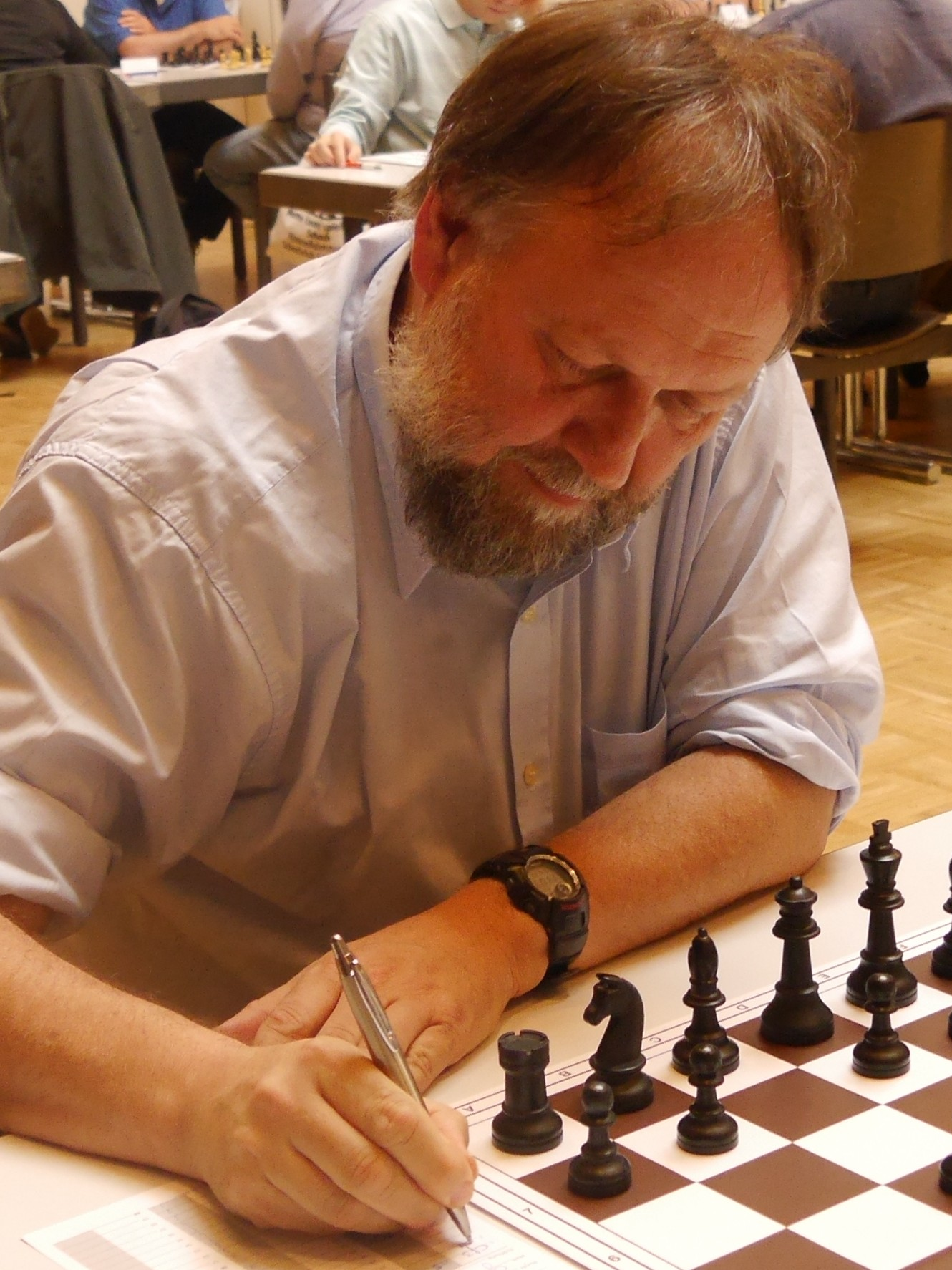
- Roos in 2016

Personal information
- Born: 7 December 1957 (age 68) Strasbourg, France

Chess career
- Country: France
- Title: International Master (1982)
- FIDE rating: 2286 (December 2021)
- Peak rating: 2455 (January 1994)

Louis Roos (born 7 December 1957) is a French chess player who holds the FIDE title of International Master (IM, 1982). He won the French Chess Championship in 1977.

== Biography ==
Roos comes from a French chess family. His father Michel Roos (1932–2002) won the French Chess Championship in 1964, his mother Jacqueline Roos (died 2016) was an International Correspondence Chess Grandmaster (2000), his sister Céline (1953–2021) was a Woman International Master (WIM), and his brothers Jean-Luc (born 1955) and Daniël (born 1959) are International Masters (IM).

From 1975 to 1977, Roos represented France three times at the World Junior Chess Championship and European Junior Chess Championships. He took part in the individual French Chess Championship finals many times and won three medals: gold (1977) and two bronze (1976, 1980).

In 1978 in Amsterdam he participated in World Chess Championship Zonal tournament. In 1999, he ranked second in the Open chess tournament in Bischwiller.

Roos played for France in the Chess Olympiads:

- In 1978, at fourth board in the 23rd Chess Olympiad in Buenos Aires (+3, =0, -4),
- In 1980, at fourth board in the 24th Chess Olympiad in La Valletta (+1, =5, -2).

He played for France in the European Team Chess Championship preliminaries:

- In 1977, at sixth board in the 6th European Team Chess Championship preliminaries (+1, =0, -3).

Roos played for France in the World Youth U26 Team Chess Championship:

- In 1983, at fourth board in the 4th World Youth U26 Team Chess Championship in Chicago (+5, =0, -4).

He played for France in the Men's Chess Mitropa Cup:

- In 1977, at first board in the 2nd Chess Mitropa Cup in Bad Kohlgrub (+1, =3, -1) and won team bronze medal.
