= Roo (disambiguation) =

Roo is a fictional character in the Winnie-the-Pooh stories.

Roo or ROO may also refer to:

== People ==
- Ago Roo (born 1946), Estonian actor
- Andrés Quintana Roo (1787–1851), Mexican liberal politician and author
- Jo de Roo (born 1937), Dutch former road racing cyclist
- Remi De Roo (born 1924), Canadian retired Roman Catholic bishop
- Roo Borson, pen name of Canadian poet Ruth Elizabeth Borson (born 1952)
- Roo Dorr (1909-c. 1961), Australian rugby union player nicknamed "Roo"
- Nick Riewoldt (born 1982), Australian rules footballer nicknamed "Roo"
- Wayne Rooney (born 1985), English football player nicknamed "Roo"

== Fictional characters ==
- Auntie Roo, in the 1961 film Whoever Slew Auntie Roo?
- Roo Stewart, in the Australian soap opera Home and Away

== Other uses ==
- Roo, shortened name for kangaroo
- ROO, IATA code for Rondonópolis Airport, Brazil
- ROO, ISO 639-3 code for the Rotokas language, spoken on the island of Bougainville, Papua New Guinea
- Roo bar or bull bar, a protective device for a motor vehicle
- RoO, abbreviation of Rules of origin in international trade

== See also ==
- Roe (disambiguation)
- Roos (disambiguation)
- Roux (disambiguation)
- Rou, Norman name of Rollo, 10th century Viking leader, first ruler of Normandy
- Rooing, a variation of sheep shearing where the fleece is plucked by hand
- Rewe (disambiguation)
- Rew (disambiguation)
- Ru (disambiguation)
- Rue (disambiguation)
