= Rue (surname) =

Rue or Rué is a surname. Notable people with the surname include:

- Gérard Rué (born 1965), French former cyclist
- Jean-Baptiste Rué (born 1974), French former rugby union player
- Joe Rue (1898-1984), American Major League Baseball umpire
- Joseph Rue, French World War II vice-admiral
- Lea Rue, stage name of Belgian singer-songwriter Emma Lauwers (born 1993)
- Loyal Rue (born 1944), American philosopher and writer
- Marcel Rué (born 1926), Monegasque sports shooter
- Nancy Rue, American Christian novelist
- Rob Rue, American politician
- Rosemary Rue (1928-2004), British physician and civil servant
- Sander Rue (born 1954), American politician
- Sara Rue, American television actress born Sara Schlackman in 1979
