= Daniël Roos =

French chess player (born 1959)

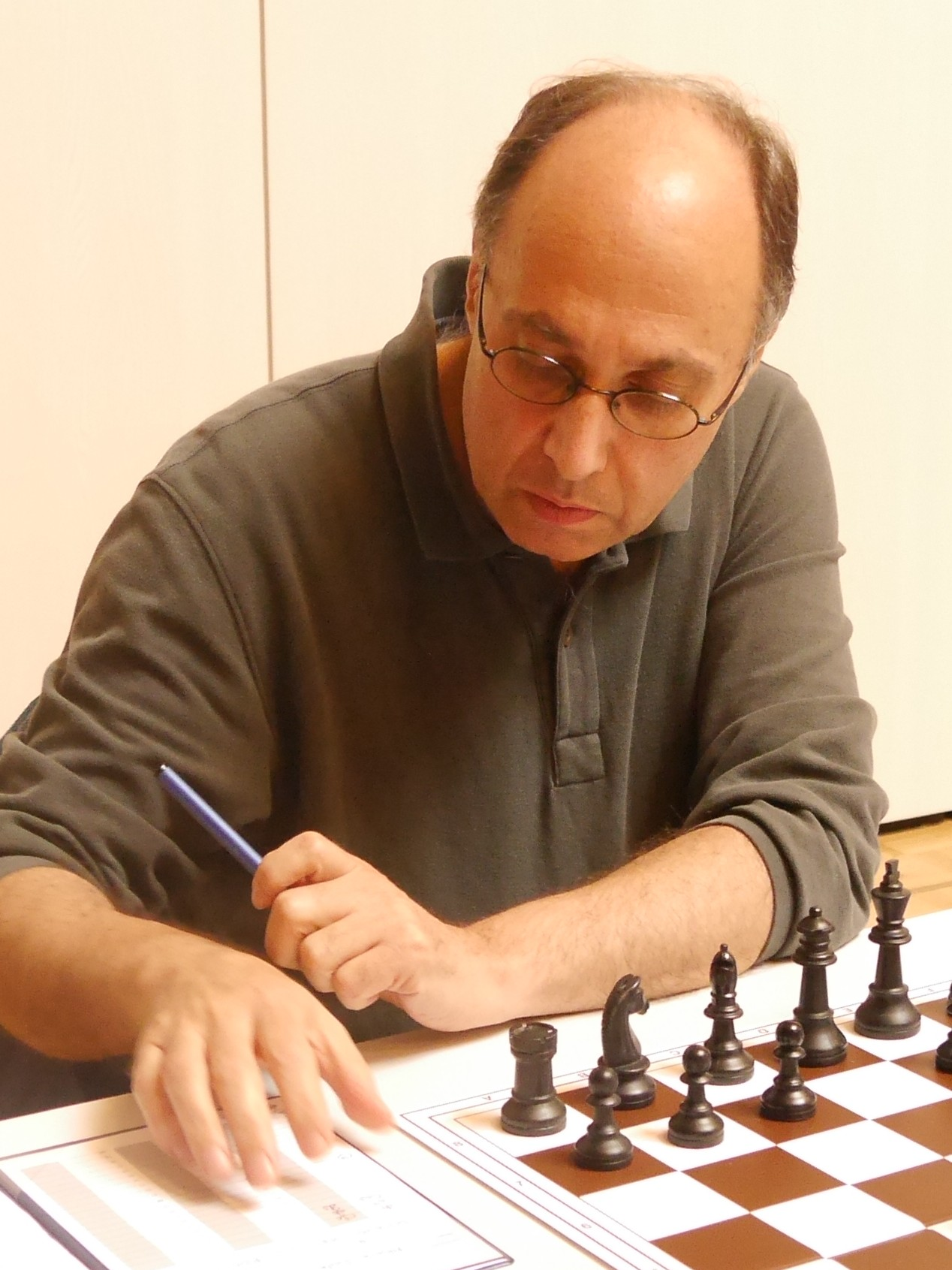
- Roos in 2016

Personal information
- Born: 9 August 1959 (age 67) Strasbourg, France

Chess career
- Country: France
- Title: International Master (1982)
- FIDE rating: 2319 (December 2021)
- Peak rating: 2455 (July 1994)

Daniël Roos (born 9 August 1959) is a French chess player who holds the FIDE title of International Master (IM, 1982). He was an individual gold medalist at the 25th Chess Olympiad in 1982.

== Biography ==
Roos comes from a French chess family. His father Michel Roos (1932–2002) won the French Chess Championship in 1964; this success was repeated by his brother Louis in 1977. His mother Jacqueline Roos (died 2016) was International Correspondence Chess Grandmaster (2000), his sister Céline (1953–2021) was a Woman International Master (WIM), his brothers Jean-Luc (born 1955) and Louis (born 1957) are International Masters (IM).

In 2009, in Salzburg, he shared 2nd - 5th place in International Chess Tournament 24. Schwarzacher Open. In 2011, in Baden-Baden he ranked 3rd in International Chess Tournament Sommer-Open.

Roos played for France in the Chess Olympiads:

- In 1980, at second reserve board in the 24th Chess Olympiad in La Valletta (+1, =5, -1),
- In 1982, at first reserve board in the 25th Chess Olympiad in Lucerne (+8, =2, -1) and won individual gold medal.

He played for France in the World Youth U26 Team Chess Championship:

- In 1981, at first board in the 3rd World Youth U26 Team Chess Championship in Graz (+2, =7, -2),
- In 1983, at first board in the 4th World Youth U26 Team Chess Championship in Chicago (+3, =1, -4).

Also, Roos seven times played for France in the Chess Mitropa Cup (1977-1979, 1984-1988) and in team competition won silver (1987) and bronze (1977) medals, but in individual competition won gold (1977) medal.

In 1982, he was awarded the FIDE International Master (IM) title.
