= Joseph Roos =

Austrian-American journalist and publicist (1908-1999)

- Born: Joseph Roos; December 10, 1908; Vienna, Austria
- Died: December 11, 1999 (aged 91); Los Angeles, California
- Occupations: Journalist and Publicist
- Known for: Anti-Discrimination Activist and Anti-Nazi Spy
- Spouse: Alvina Roos (d. 2002)
- Children: Leonard M. Roos

Joseph Roos (December 10, 1908 – December 11, 1999) was an American journalist, publicist, and Hollywood story editor. He wrote hundreds of radio scripts and won a Peabody Award. He fought against discrimination and was well-known for his work as a community activist in the 1950s, 1960s, and 1970s. Roos was executive director of the Jewish Federation Council of Greater Los Angeles, Community Relations Committee, and vice president of the American Jewish Congress. He is best known for his anti-Nazi spying activities in the 1930s and 1940s which resulted in the successful prosecution of American Nazis and the prevention of dozens of acts of sabotage and assassinations.

== Early life ==
Joseph Roos was born in Vienna, Austria, in 1908, and while still an infant, moved with his parents to Berlin. While the Roos extended family was made up of religious Jews and distinguished rabbis, Joseph Roos identified as a secular Jew. In 1927, Roos emigrated to the United States, settling in Chicago where he became a journalist.

== Career ==
Roos began his journalistic career as a reporter for the German language Illinois Staats-Zeitung. Later he was employed as a journalist by the Chicago Daily News and the Chicago Herald-Examiner. At around the same time he and his uncle, Julius Klein, started the anti-Nazi newspaper the National Free Press and began spying on local Nazi groups. Roos caught the attention of George C. Marshall, who had him trained in espionage and provided him with federal resources. Roos also received authorization for his growing spy network from Illinois governor Henry Horner, and ultimately provided state and federal authorities with dozens of intelligence reports on Nazi activities in the Midwest.

Roos moved to Los Angeles in 1934 to work in Hollywood as a writer and editor, but he found himself again involved in anti-Nazi spying, which included infiltration of the Silver Legion of America, the Ku Klux Klan, the isolationist group America First, and the German American Bund. Along with his secret activities before and during the war, Roos also developed a national profile with his publication of the News Research Service newsletter, which published a continual stream of documentation of Nazi activity in the U.S. and allowed him to develop close relationships with politicians, activists, and journalists such as Walter Winchell.

In 1950, Roos became the executive director of the Jewish Federation Council of Greater Los Angeles, Community Relations Committee, succeeding Leon L. Lewis, and was involved with social and political issues in Southern California such as school busing, discrimination, and prayer in schools. Roos served in this capacity until 1969. He eventually formed his own public relations business, and consulted with many organizations both locally and nationally. Every year since 1985 the Public Relations Society of America, Los Angeles chapter, has given out the Joseph Roos Community Service Award to honor his work in the community.

== Personal life ==
Joseph Roos was married to Alvina Roos, and the couple had one son, Leonard M. Roos. Roos died of natural causes on December 11, 1999, in Los Angeles, California.

== Legacy ==
Every year since 1985 the Public Relations Society of America, Los Angeles chapter, has given out the Joseph Roos Community Service Award to honor his work in the community. His archival papers are held by USC Libraries Special Collections at the University of Southern California.

== In popular culture ==
Joseph Roos and his work spying on Nazis in the 1930s and early 1940s is fictionalized in the 2022 novel Mother Daughter Traitor Spy by Susan Elia MacNeal where he is renamed "Jonah Rose."
