= Victor Kahn =

Russian–French chess master

Victor Kahn (Russian: Виктор Кан; 1889 in Moscow – 6 October 1971 in Nice) was a Russian–French chess master.

He was born in Moscow but left Russia in 1912 eventually ending up in France going via Sweden, Denmark and Germany. He won the Copenhagen Championship in 1916. He also played at Hamburg 1916. He tied for 8-9th at Copenhagen 1918.

After World War I, he tied for 1st-2nd at Haarlem 1919. He took 10th at Paris 1920 (Frederic Lazard won). In 1921, he took 3rd in Utrecht (Quadrangular; Adolf Olland won). In 1922, he tied for 2nd-3rd in Paris (André Muffang won). In 1923, Kahn won in Paris (Cercle Philidor Tournament).

In 1924, he tied for 4-7th in Paris (Eugene Znosko-Borovsky won). In 1925, he tied for 5-7th in Paris City Championship (Abraham Baratz and Vitaly Halberstadt won), took 4th in Scarborough (Max Romih won), tied for 1st-2nd with Bertrand in Paris. In 1926, he tied for 3rd-4th in Paris Championship (Leon Schwartzmann won), tied for 3rd-4th in Paris (Peter Potemkine and Halberstadt won), tied for 5-6th in Scarborough (Alexander Alekhine won), and took 3rd in Paris Baratz won). In 1927, he tied for 8-9th in Paris Championship (Baratz won). In 1930, he tied for 3-5th in Paris Championship (Josef Cukierman won).

After settling in Nice, he acquired French nationality. In 1932, he took 9th in La Baule (11th FRA-ch; Maurice Raizman won). In 1933, he tied for 3rd-4th in Sarreguemines (12th FRA-ch; Aristide Gromer won). In 1934, he won the 13th French Championship in Paris, tied for 1st-2nd with Raizman in 16th Paris Championship, and took 2nd, behind Znosko-Borovsky, in Nice. In 1935 he lost a match against Spanish player Ramon Rey Ardid (+0 –2 =4) in Zaragoza, he tied for 1st-2nd with George Koltanowski in Mollet. In 1937, he took 3rd in Nice (Quadrangular; Alekhine won), and took 3rd in Toulouse (16th FRA-ch; Gromer and Amédée Gibaud won). In 1938, he took 4th in Nice (17th FRA-ch; Raizman and Gromer won).

Kahn played in several Chess Olympiads. He represented Russia in 1st unofficial Chess Olympiad at Paris 1924, and played for France four times.

- In 1931, at third board in 4th Olympiad in Prague (+1 –7 =5);
- In 1933, at third board in 5th Olympiad in Folkestone (+3 –3 =6);
- In 1935, at fourth board in 6th Olympiad in Warsaw (+1 –4 =4);
- In 1939, at third board in 8th Olympiad in Buenos Aires (+4 –9 =5).
