= Tihomil Drezga =

Croatian chess player

Personal information
- Born: Tihomil Drezga; 1903 Šibenik, Croatia
- Died: 08/14/1981 Erie, Pennsylvania, United States

Chess career
- Country: Croatia

Tihomil Drezga (Dresga, Drezza) (December 10, 1903– August 14, 1981) was a Croatian chess master.

He was born in Šibenik, Croatia, and graduated from a gymnasium in Split. Then he studied international law at the Sorbonne in Paris and received a doctorate of law.

In 1927/28, he won in the Lites Chess Club in Paris, followed by Josef Cukierman, Vitaly Halberstadt, Victor Kahn, etc.; won two games for French team in 2nd Chess Olympiad at The Hague 1928; tied for 6-7th in the 4th Paris City Chess Championship 1928 (Abraham Baratz won), and won, ahead of Eugene Znosko-Borovsky, in the 5th Paris-ch 1929.

After spending some years in France, Drezga returned to Yugoslavia. He took 2nd at Zagreb 1934, took 9th at Maribor 1934 (Vasja Pirc and Lajos Steiner won), and took 2nd, behind Petar Trifunović, at Zagreb 1935.

He graduated in 1922 in Šibenik, studied law and political science in Paris, and received his doctorate in 1931 at the Sorbonne with his thesis Les Problèmes Fondamentaux du Droit des Gens et la Cour Permanente de Justice Internationale. From 1932 to 1937 he was a district judge in Zagreb and Đurđevac, from 1937 to 1941 he was a lawyer in Zagreb and Vrbovsko. In 1942 he joined the Ministry of Foreign Affairs of the Independent State of Croatia, founded its legal department, which he headed until the end of the war; he equipped a rich library with works on international law and diplomacy, which was transferred to the Ministry of Foreign Affairs in Belgrade after the war. At the same time, from 1943 to 1945 he was a professor of international law at the Faculty of Law in Zagreb. After the war he was tried and imprisoned for not being communist until 1947 in Stara Gradiška. In the summer of 1948 he fled to Italy and in Rome in 1949 he graduated from the Vatican Library School. From 1952 to 1955 lives in Los Angeles, 1955/56. taught at Alliance College in Cambridge Springs, Pennsylvania, 1956–65. he was a professor at Gannon College in Erie and from 1965 until his retirement in 1969 again at Alliance College. — During the war, he published articles on the dismantling of the Treaties of Rome, on the origin, recognition and international position of the NDH (Readiness, 1943, 83; 1944, 149–150; 1945, 163–164). Prepared for printing the International Treaties of the Independent State of Croatia 1941, 1942, 1943 (1–3; Zagreb 1942–1944). During his stay in Rome, he published articles on the position of the Croatian state in the international system of Gregory VII (1950) and on Croats in Italian literature (1951) in L'Osservatore Romano. He wrote about the role of religion in shaping the international community (Doctor Communis. Acta et commentationes Pontificiae Academiae Romanae S. Thomae Aquinatis, vol. 3–4, 1950), about the Gratian decree and the Croats (Studia Gratiana, Bologna 1956–57, 4), about the international legal aspect of the case of A. Artuković (Danica, Chicago 1951; Croatia, Buenos Aires 1951), about Pope Gregory VII. and to the Croatian king Dmitri Zvonimir (Hrvatska revija. Jubilarni zbornik 1951–1975, Munich—Barcelona 1975). He is the author of works on H. Sienkiewicz and I. Gundulić (Alliance Journal, Cambridge Springs 1956) and the study Paulus Vladimiri Epistula (The Polish Review, New York 1975, 4). He died in Erie, Pennsylvania on one of his son’s 45th birthday.
