= Léon Monosson =

Léon Monosson (21 December 1892, Shchedrin – 17 February 1943, Auschwitz) was a Belarusian–French chess master.

Born in Shtetl Shchedrin, near Bobruisk (Belarus), he took 10th in Petrograd (St. Petersburg) 1921 Then he emigrated to France.

Dr Monosson was Paris Champion in 1935, He also took 5th in the 4th Paris City Chess Championship 1928 (Abraham Baratz won), and took 5th at Paris 1938 (L'Echiquier, Baldur Hoenlinger won).

In January 1940, he played with Wilhelm Orbach, Josef Cukierman, etc., in Paris (Savielly Tartakower won). During World War II, he was deported from France to Auschwitz concentration camp where he died in 1943.
