= Gustave Lazard =

French chess player, problemist, and organizer

Gustave Lazard (1876 - 1948) was a French chess master, problemist and organizer.

Lazard was born at Aachen, Germany on December 7, 1876.

He was an elder brother of Frédéric Lazard. His chess career took place in Paris. He tied for 5-6th in 1907 (Frank Marshall won), took 8th in 1908 (J. Grommer won), took 9th in 1909 (Arnold Aurbach won), took 7th in 1909 (H. Weinstein won), took 7th in 1910 (F. Lazard won), and took 9th in 1912 (F. Lazard and J. Grommer won).

After World War I, he shared 7th at Paris 1920 (F. Lazard won), took 8th in 1922 (André Muffang won), took 12th in the 1926 Paris City Chess Championship (Leon Schwartzmann won), tied for 10-12th in the 1927 Paris-ch (Abraham Baratz won), took 12th in the 1928 Paris-ch (Baratz won), tied for 3rd-5th in the 1930 Paris-ch (Josef Cukierman won).

He was a president of a chess club Cercle Philidor in Paris.

Lazard died November 30, 1948, in Paris.
