= Vitaly Halberstadt =

Ukrainian-French chess player (1903–1967)

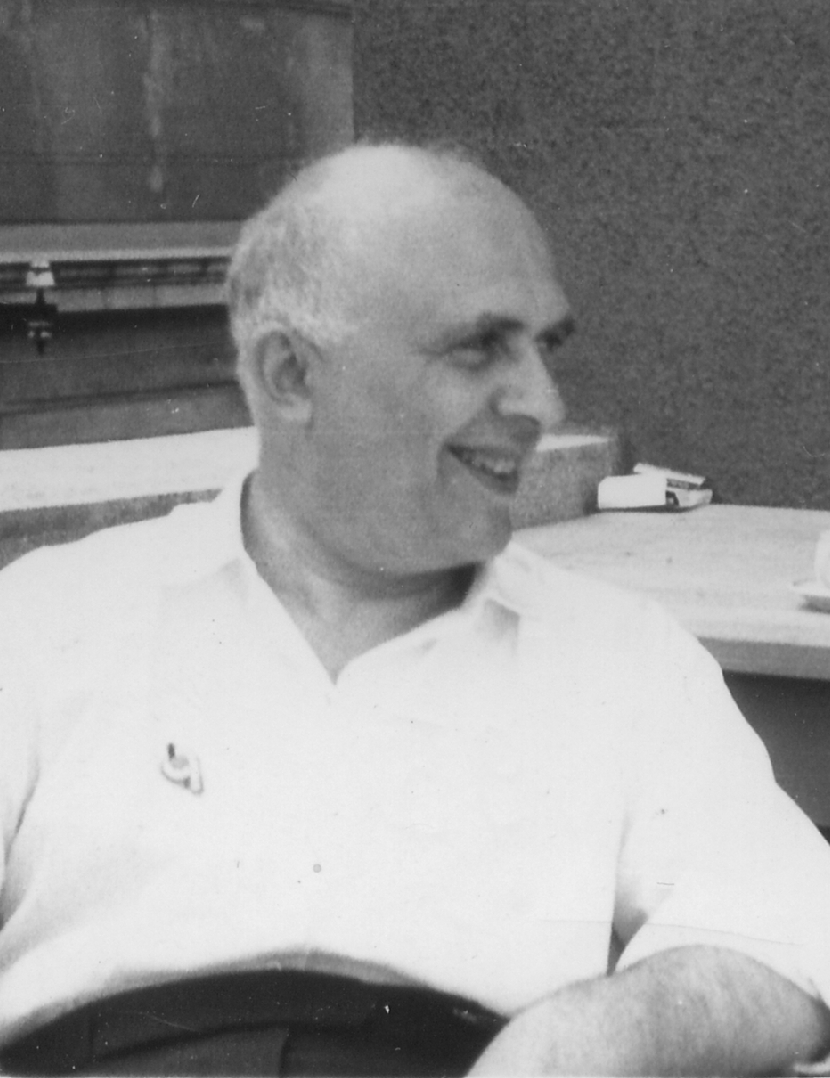
Vitaly Halberstadt

Vitaly Halberstadt (20 March 1903, Odessa – 25 October 1967, Paris) was a French chess player, theorist, problemist, and a noted endgame study composer.

Born in Odessa, in the Kherson Governorate of the Russian Empire (present-day Ukraine), he emigrated to France after the Russian Civil War.

== Chess games ==
Chess games during Halberstadt's career
Year	Placement	Competition or location	Victor of year
1925	1st place (shared with Abraham Baratz)	Paris City Chess Championship	Halberstadt and Baratz
1926	2nd place	Paris City Chess Championship	Leon Schwartzmann
1926	5-6th places	Hyères	Abraham Baratz
1926	1st place (shared with Peter Potemkine)	Paris	Halberstadt and Potemkine
1927	5-7th places	Paris City Chess Championship	Abraham Baratz
1928	10-11th places	Paris City Chess Championship	Abraham Baratz
1928	1st-3rd places (tied with Marcel Duchamp and J.J. O'Hanlon)	Hyères	Halberstadt, Duchamp and O'Hanlon
1930	8th place	Paris City Chess Championship	Josef Cukierman
1931	6th place	Paris City Chess Championship	Eugene Znosko-Borovsky
1932	3rd place	Paris City Chess Championship	Oscar Blum
1938	9th	Paris (L'Echiquier)	Baldur Hoenlinger

== Publications ==
In 1932, Halberstadt published with Marcel Duchamp "L'Opposition et les cases conjugées sont réconciliées", a chess manual dedicated to several special end-game problems, for which Duchamp designed the layout and cover. In this book, Duchamp and Halberstadt addressed the complication of the so-called "heterodox opposition", which is a precisely organized endgame that involved two kings and a handful of pawns. This concept has established a figure of immobilized reversibility between two subjective positions and two players. Within a condition where only two kings remain, the duo described the move in the following manner:

The king 'may act in such a way as to suggest he has completely lost interest in winning the game. Then the other king, if he is a true sovereign, can give the appearance of being even less interested.' Until one of them provokes the other into a blunder.

Halberstadt was also the author of "Curiosités tactiques des finales" (1954).
