= Oscar Blum =

Lithuanian-French chess player

- Born: October 15, 1887
- Occupation: chess player

Oscar Blum (1886 – ?) was a Lithuanian–French chess master. He was pushed off Lenin's 1917 train by Lenin himself This incident is mentioned in Ben Kingsley's Lenin movie (Lenin...The Train), and in James Wollrab: Russian Winter p. 206

In 1923 his book Russiche Köpfe was published in Germany. He described Grigory Zinoviev as a dreamer, a sleepwalker, who lived in a world of pure literature.

== Chess ==
He won, ahead of Nicolas Rossolimo and Vitaly Halberstadt, in the 8th Paris City Chess Championship in 1932. Dr Oscar Blum played at Folkestone 1933. He participated not in the 5th Chess Olympiad but in the General Congress, finishing second, half a point behind Eugene Znosko-Borovsky.
