= Frédéric Lazard =

French chess player

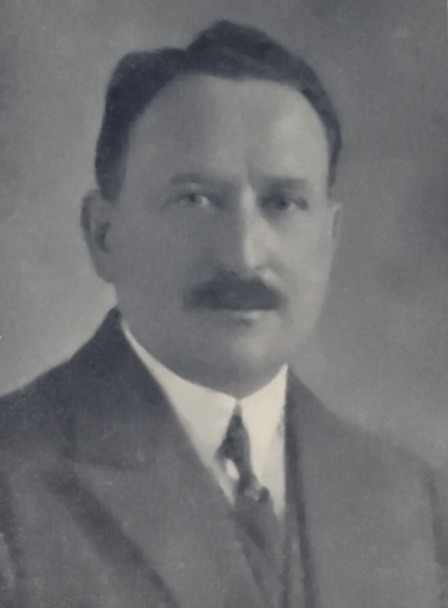
Frédéric Lazard, 1929

Frédéric Lazard (20 February 1883, in Marseille – 18 November 1948, in Le Vésinet) was a French chess master, problemist and journalist.

He lived in Paris, where he played in many local tournaments. He took twice 4th place in 1905, shared 3rd in 1908, took 3rd (Arnold Aurbach won) in 1909, shared 2nd behind H. Weinstein in 1909, won ahead of Amédée Gibaud in 1910, tied for 1st with Aristide Gromer in 1912, took 4th in 1914, and shared 2nd, behind Alphonse Goetz, at Lyon 1914.

In 1912, he drew a match with Gibaud (3–3), and lost to Edward Lasker (0.5–2.5). In 1913, he drew with Smirnov (1.5–1.5).

After World War I, he won at Paris 1920, took 2nd at Paris 1922 (Triangular, André Muffang won), represented France in 1st unofficial Chess Olympiad at Paris 1924, took 9th at Strasbourg 1924 (French Chess Championship, Robert Crépeaux won), tied for 2nd-3rd at Nice 1925 (FRA-ch, Crépeaux won), shared 1st with André Chéron at Biarritz 1926 (FRA-ch), took 13th in the 1927 Paris City Chess Championship (Abraham Baratz won), tied for 10-11th in the 1928 Paris-ch (Baratz won), took 7th at Paris 1929 (Savielly Tartakower won), tied for 3rd-5th in the 1930 Paris-ch (Josef Cukierman won), and took 10th at Paris 1933 (Alexander Alekhine won).

He published a chess book entitled Mes problèmes et études d'échecs (1928).

He was a younger brother of Gustave Lazard.

== Apocryphal game ==
Gibaud vs. Lazard (apocryphal),
Paris 1924

Position: h1 white rook, g1 white knight, f1 white bishop, e1 white king, d1 white queen, c1 white bishop, a1 white rook, g2 white pawn, f2 white pawn, e2 white pawn, d2 white knight, c2 white pawn, b2 white pawn, a2 white pawn, h3 white pawn, e3 black knight, e5 white pawn, h7 black pawn, g7 black pawn, f7 black pawn, d7 black pawn, c7 black pawn, b7 black pawn, a7 black pawn, h8 black rook, f8 black bishop, e8 black king, d8 black queen, c8 black bishop, b8 black knight, a8 black rook

Position following 1. d4 Nf6 2. Nd2 e5 3. dxe5 Ng4 4. h3 Ne3

A very short miniature attributed to Amédée Gibaud and Lazard is frequently reproduced in chess literature, sometimes with the claim that it was the shortest game ever played between masters in a formal setting. In its shortest and most commonly reproduced version, the game consists of four moves by each player. Black (Lazard) rapidly develops his king's knight to e3 after White (Gibaud) weakens the defense of the square.

Gibaud vs. Lazard (apocryphal), Paris 1924
1. d4 Nf6 2. Nd2 e5 3. dxe5 Ng4 4. h3 Ne3 0–1 (Resignation)

In the final position White is unable to prevent the capture of his queen, because doing so would allow Black to force checkmate: 5. fxe3 Qh4+ 6. g3 Qxg3#.

The four-move, "formal" version of the game is not accepted as a real historical event. Gibaud denied having ever lost a serious game in four moves, instead suggesting that he may have lost a casual skittles game against Lazard involving similar positional themes, albeit with more than four moves played. Gibaud also suggested that his game with Lazard might have been confused with a previously published "theoretical" miniature. Although the four-move version of the game is not accepted as historically accurate, it illustrates several principles of gameplay: the possibility for rapid development to cause serious problems for an opponent, the importance of not weakening the defense of critical squares, and the importance of defending a structural weakness on the kingside in the initial phase of the game (especially involving the f- and g- pawns), which if left unguarded may lead to a quick checkmate, akin to Fool's mate.
