= Laurent Guidarelli =

French chess grandmaster (born 1981)

Personal information
- Born: June 18, 1981 (age 45) Carpentras, France

Chess career
- Country: France
- Title: Grandmaster (2014)
- FIDE rating: 2458 (July 2026)
- Peak rating: 2511 (November 2015)

Laurent Guidarelli is a French chess grandmaster.

== Chess career ==
He captained the Cannes team in the 2008 French Chess Club Championships, and was an organizer of the 2013 French Youth Chess Championships. He is a coach at the Orange Chess Club.

In April 2022, he was announced as the trainer for the French team for the Mitropa Cup.

In July 2024, he was part of the team who supervised the Île de loisirs du Val-de-Seine training camp, alongside Quentin Loiseau, Christine Flear, Romuald De Labaca, Silvia Alexieva, Olivier Renet, Adrien Demuth, Matthieu Bissières, Yovann Gatineau, and Axel Delorme.
