= Abergel =

Abergel (Arabic: أبيرجل, Hebrew: אברג'ל), also spelled Abargil, Abergil, Abourgil, Abourgal, Abourjal, Abirjal, Aberjel) is a Moroccan Jewish surname. It is very common among the Moroccan Jews and may be found also among Algerian and Tunisian Jews of Moroccan descent. The name comes from Moroccan Arabic word "Bourjila" which means the "One-footed".

Notable people with the surname include:

- Avital Abergel (born 1977), Israeli actress
- Laurent Abergel (born 1993), French footballer
- Linor Abargil (born 1980), Israeli beauty pageant winner
- Nir Abergel (born 1990), Israeli footballer
- Rebecca Abergel, French chemist
- Reuven Abergel (born 1943), Israeli activist
- Thal Abergel (born 1982), French chess grandmaster
- Yaniv Abargil (born 1977), Israeli footballer

== See also ==
- Abargil
