= Chess Forum =

Chess Shop

Coordinates: 40.7292242°N 73.999317°W

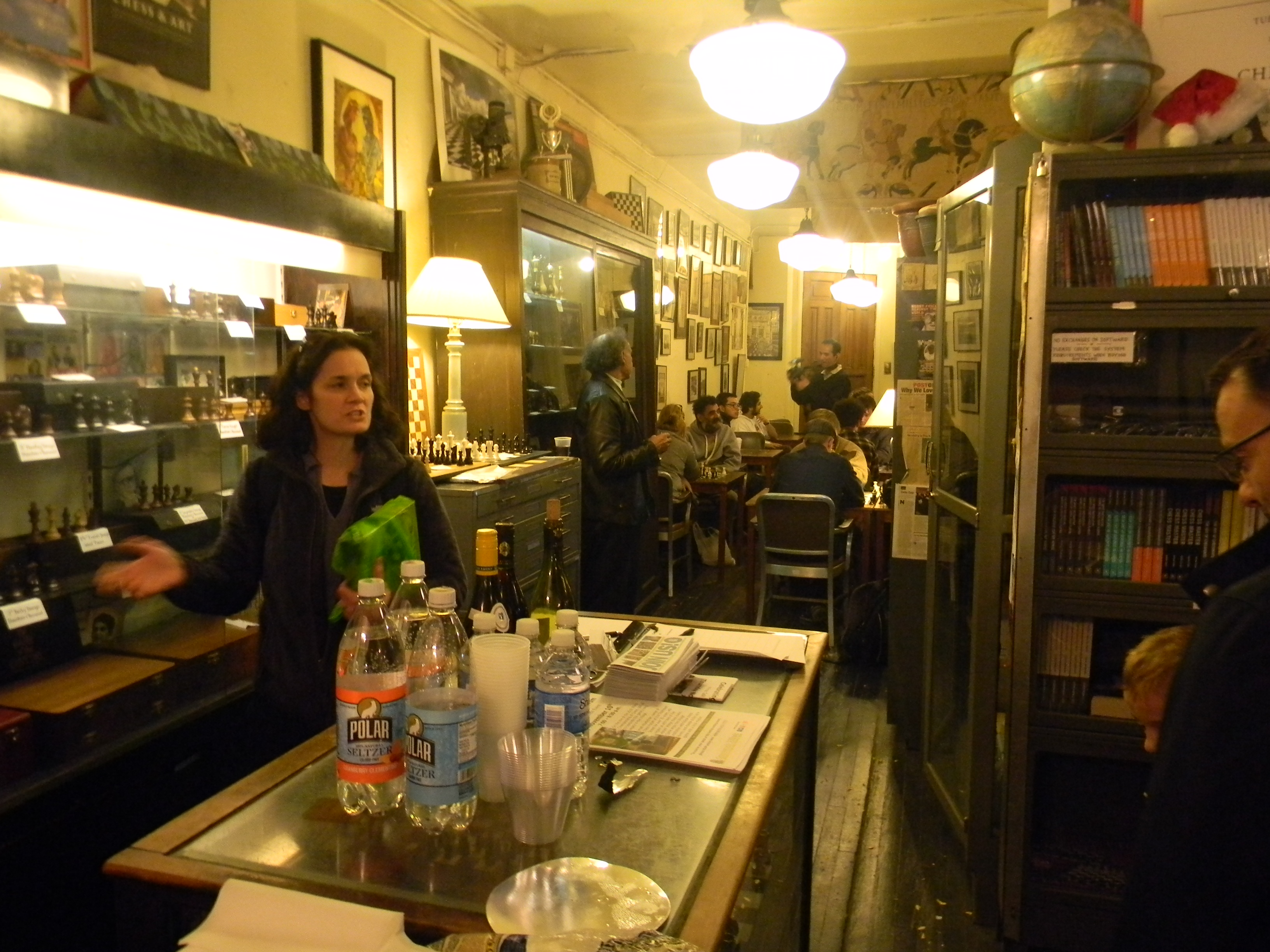
Chess Forum in 2016

Chess Forum is a chess shop in Greenwich Village, Lower Manhattan. It was founded in 1995 by Palestinian refugee Imad Khachan at 219 Thompson Street across from the Chess Shop with which Chess Forum had a rivalry. The site had previously been occupied by Rossolimo's Chess Studio in the 1970s. As well as selling boards and pieces for chess, backgammon, and related games, Chess Forum rents tables to players and also offers lessons. It has been dubbed as the last remaining chess shop in New York City. Around 2020, Chess Forum had been on the verge of bankruptcy, but the release of the Netflix series The Queen's Gambit brought a resurgence in customers.
