= Peter Potemkine =

Russian Empire chess master

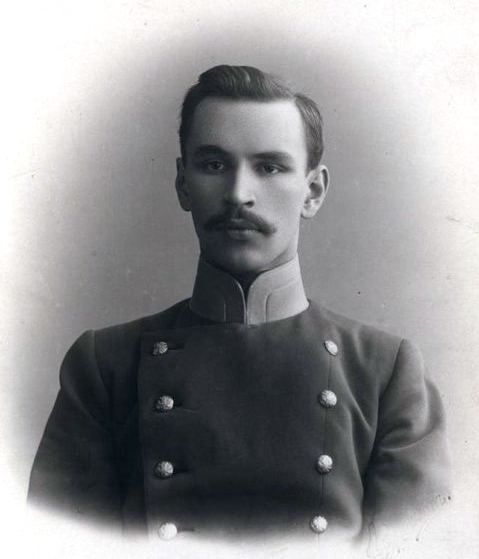
Peter Potemkine

Peter Petrovich Potemkine (Russian: Пётр Петрович Потёмкин, romanized: Pyotr Petrovich Potyomkin; 1886–1926) was a Russian chess master.

He took 7th at St. Petersburg 1904 (Mikhail Chigorin won), took 5th at St Petersburg 1907 (Eugene Znosko-Borovsky won, and took 8th at St Petersburg 1913 (Andrey Smorodsky won). In winter 1912, he played with Alexander Alekhine and Vasily Osipovich Smyslov (father of Vasily Smyslov) in Sankt Petersburg. In 1920, he tied for 3rd-6th in Moscow (Alexei Alekhine won).

Count Potemkine was a White émigré living in France. He officially represented Russia in 1st unofficial Chess Olympiad at Paris 1924.

He tied for 7-8th at Prague 1923 (Karel Skalička won), tied for 4-7th at Paris 1924 (Znosko-Borovsky won), tied for 5-6th at Paris 1925 (Victor Kahn won), and shared 1st with Vitaly Halberstadt at Paris 1926.

In 1926, Le Cercle d'échecs Potemkine was established in Paris.
