= Christophe Sochacki =

French chess grandmaster (born 1994)

Personal information
- Born: June 19, 1994 (age 32) Paris, France

Chess career
- Country: France
- Title: Grandmaster (2022)
- FIDE rating: 2487 (July 2026)
- Peak rating: 2494 (June 2021)

Christophe Sochacki is a French chess grandmaster.

== Chess career ==
In July 2011, he earned his first GM norm at the Paris City Chess Championship. He earned his next GM norms at the Top 12 Team Championship in June 2013 and the National Team Championship in March 2019.

In April 2012, he successfully employed the rare Portsmouth Gambit in the third round of the French Cadet Chess Championship.

In August 2017, he won the Charleroi Blitz Tournament with a perfect score of 11/11.
