= Paris City Chess Championship =

Chess competition

The first Paris City Chess Championship was held in 1925. Since 1989 the title of Paris Champion has been awarded to the highest-placed French player licensed in Île-de-France for the current and previous season.

#	Year	Winner
1	1925	Abraham Baratz; Vitaly Halberstadt
2	1926	Leon Schwartzmann
3	1927	Abraham Baratz
4	1928	Abraham Baratz
5	1929	Tihomil Drezga
6	1930	Josef Cukierman
7	1931	Eugene Znosko-Borovsky
8	1932	Oscar Blum
9	1933	Alexander Alekhine
10	1934	Nicolas Rossolimo
11	1935	Léon Monosson
12	1936	Nicolas Rossolimo
13	1937	Volodia Matveeff
14	1938	Maurice Raizman
	1939–40	not held
17	1941	Volodia Matveeff
18	1942	Robert Crépeaux
19	1943	Constant Schoen
20	1944	César Boutteville
21	1945	César Boutteville
22	1946	César Boutteville
23	1947	Nicolas Rossolimo
24	1948	Nicolas Rossolimo
25	1949	Nicolas Rossolimo
26	1950	Jacques Planté
27	1951	Stepan Popel
28	1952	César Boutteville
29	1953	Stepan Popel
30	1954	Stepan Popel
31	1955	Pierre Rolland
32	1956	Borko Simonovic
33	1957	Jacques Ratner
34	1958	Guy Mazzoni
35	1959	Gérard Linais
36	1961	César Boutteville
37	1962	François Molnar
38	1963	François Molnar
39	1964	François Molnar
40	1965	Bogdan Ducic
41	1966	Miodrag Todorcevic
42	1967	Miodrag Todorcevic
43	1968	Claude Jean
44	1969	Bernard Huguet
45	1970	Kristian Cormier
46	1971	Alexanadar Obradovic
47	1972	César Boutteville
48	1973	Miodrag Todorcevic
49	1974	Miodrag Todorcevic
50	1975	Jacques Maclès
51	1976	Miodrag Todorcevic
52	1977	Georges Noradounguian
53	1978	Christian Lécuyer
54	1979	Alain Villeneuve
55	1980	Israel Zilber (off contest); Nicolas Giffard
56	1981	Didier Sellos
57	1982	Éric Prié
58	1983	Éric Prié
59	1984	Olivier Renet
60	1985	Slim Belkhodja
61	1986	Nabil Doghri
62	1987	Jacques Maclès
63	1988	Didier Sellos
64	1989	Christophe Bernard
65	1990	Manuel Apicella
66	1991	Jacques Elbilia
67	1992	Éric Prié
68	1993	Laurent Vérat
69	1994	Jacques Demarre
70	1995	Olivier Renet
71	1996	Éric Prié
72	1997	Éloi Relange
73	1998	Éloi Relange
74	1999	Ashot Anastasian (off contest); Éloi Relange
75	2000	Stanislav Savchenko (off contest); Joël Lautier
76	2001	Christian Bauer (off contest); Luc Bergèz
77	2002	Yochanan Afek (off contest); Laurent Fressinet
78	2003	Alberto David (off contest); Thal Abergel
79	2004	Jean-Marc Degraeve
80	2005	Alberto David (off contest); Laurent Fressinet
81	2006	Murtas Kazhgaleyev (off contest); Daniel Fridman
82	2007	Maxime Vachier-Lagrave
83	2008	Maxime Vachier-Lagrave
84	2009	Murtas Kazhgaleyev (off contest); Sergey Fedorchuk
85	2010	Sebastien Feller
86	2011	Arun Prasad (off contest); Sergey Fedorchuk
87	2012	Sergey Fedorchuk
88	2013	Adrien Demuth
89	2014	Sergey Fedorchuk
90	2015	S. P. Sethuraman (off contest); Olivier Renet
91	2016	Jules Moussard
92	2017	Bilel Bellahcene
93	2018	Jules Moussard
94	2019	Jules Moussard
