= Olivier Renet =

French chess grandmaster (born 1964)

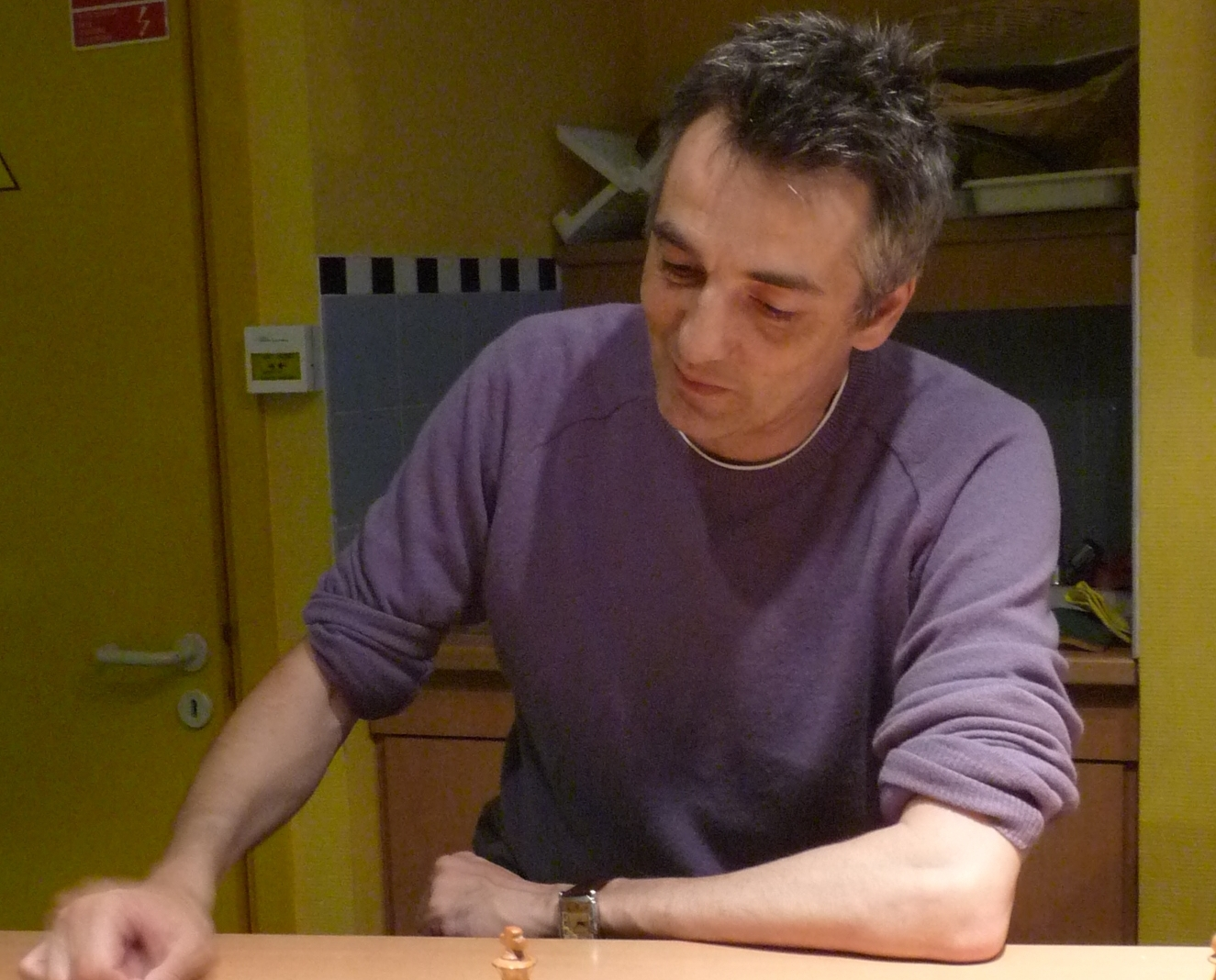
- Renet in 2010

Personal information
- Born: December 21, 1964 (age 61) Paris, France

Chess career
- Country: France
- Title: Grandmaster (1990)
- Peak rating: 2535 (January 1993)

Olivier Renet (born December 21, 1964) is a French chess grandmaster.

== Chess career ==
In 1990, he was defeated by Alexei Shirov, who used an idea from the later-disgraced former grandmaster Igors Rausis.

He was one of Romain Édouard's coaches, whom he met in the French Youth Team Championships.

In July 2019, he was the 8th seed in the Corsica Open International Chess, where he lost to Raunak Sadhwani, who eventually won the bronze medal.

In July 2024, he was part of the team who supervised the Île de loisirs du Val-de-Seine training camp, alongside Quentin Loiseau, Christine Flear, Romuald De Labaca, Silvia Alexieva, Laurent Guidarelli, Adrien Demuth, Matthieu Bissières, Yovann Gatineau, and Axel Delorme.
