= Yochanan Afek =

Israeli chess player (born 1952)

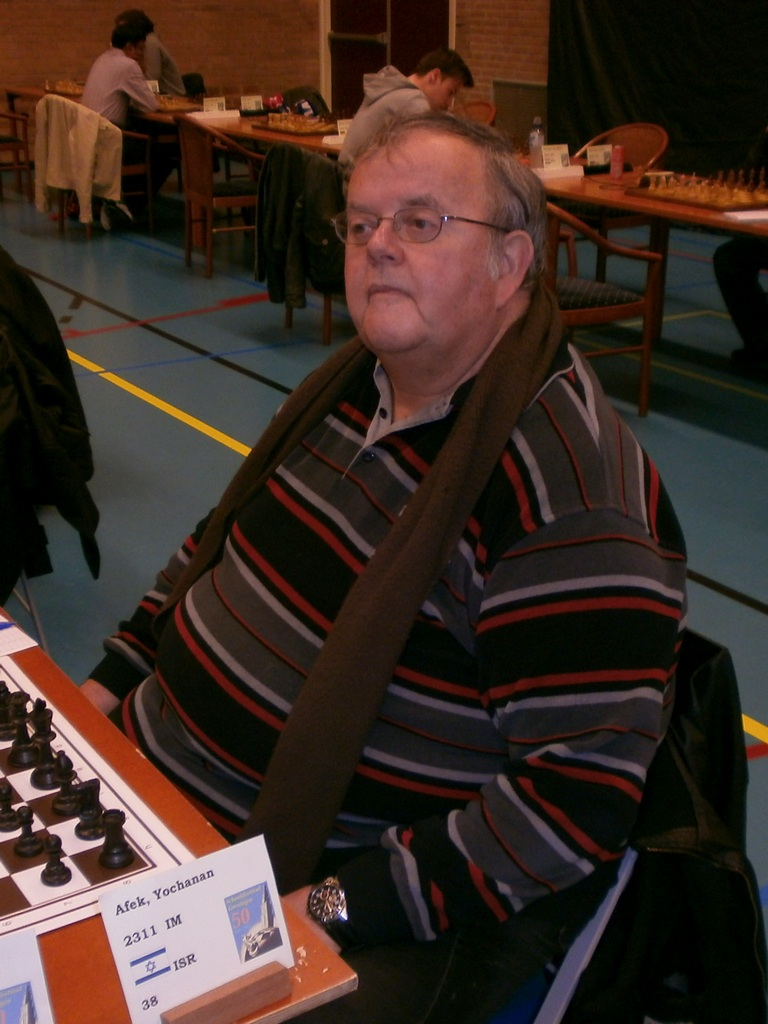
- Afek in 2012

Personal information
- Native name: יוחנן אפק
- Born: 16 April 1952 (age 74) Tel Aviv, Israel

Chess career
- Country: Israel
- Title: International Master (1993)
- Peak rating: 2430 (July 1993)

Yochanan Afek (Hebrew: יוחנן אפק; born Yohanan Kopelovich, 16 April 1952) is an Israeli chess player, composer, trainer and arbiter. He is the only person to possess international titles at five different facets of chess, being an International Master, International Grandmaster of chess composition, International Arbiter, FIDE master in problem solving (2005), and International Judge for chess compositions. In 2002, he won Paris City Chess Championship (off contest). Afek won the prestigious Art chess tournament in Amsterdam organized by the foundation for aristocratic art and culture (stichting Aristocratische Cultuur en Kunst) where various grandmasters participated.

The second chapter of Tibor Karolyi's 2009 book Genius in the Background is devoted to him.

Afek described pioneering Israeli master Moshe Czerniak as “my teacher”.

== Bibliography ==
- Neiman, Emmanuel; Afek, Yochanan (2011). Invisible Chess Moves. New In Chess. ISBN 978-9056913687.
- Afek, Yochanan (2017). Extreme Chess Tactics. Gambit Publications. ISBN 978-1911465126.
- Afek, Yochanan (2018). Practical Chess Beauty. Quality Chess. ISBN 978-1784830755.
