= Abargil =

Abargil is a surname. Notable people with the surname include:

- Linor Abargil (born 1980), Israeli beauty pageant winner
- Yaniv Abargil (born 1977), Israeli footballer
- Abergil crime family

== See also ==
- Abergel
