= Bernard Huguet =

French chess player

Personal information
- Born: 30 March 1933 (age 93)

Chess career
- Country: France

Bernard Huguet (born 30 March 1933), is a French chess FIDE Master (FM), French Chess Championship medalist (1967), Paris City Chess Championship winner (1969), Chess Olympiad individual bronze medal winner (1968).

== Biography ==
In the 1960s, Bernard Huguet was one of the best French chess players. In 1969 he won Paris City Chess Championship. He has played in individual French Chess Championship finals many times and won a bronze medal in 1967. In 1969 in Algarve he participated in World Chess Championship Zonal tournament and shared 9th–10th place.

Bernard Huguet played for France in the Chess Olympiads:

- In 1966, at first reserve board in the 17th Chess Olympiad in Havana (+3, =5, -5),
- In 1968, at third board in the 18th Chess Olympiad in Lugano (+9, =2, -2) and won individual bronze medal,
- In 1972, at fourth board in the 20th Chess Olympiad in Skopje (+3, =5, -5).

Until 2008, Bernard Huguet regularly participated in senior chess tournaments: French Senior Chess Championships (2002, 2004), European and World Senior Chess Championships (2001, 2002).
