= Jacques Maclès =

French chess player (born 1945)

Personal information
- Born: 8 July 1945 (age 81)

Chess career
- Country: France
- Title: FIDE Master (1983)
- FIDE rating: 2301 (February 2013)
- Peak rating: 2375 (January 1988)

Jacques Maclès (born 8 July 1945) is a French chess FIDE master (FM), French Chess Championship winner (1970) and Paris City Chess Championship winner (1975).

== Biography ==
In 1965, in Barcelona, Jacques Maclès participated in the 8th World Junior Chess Championship and ranked 17th. He also participated in a number of international chess competitions held in the 1960s-1980s in France. Jacques Maclès won the French Chess Championship in 1970 and the Paris City Chess Championship in 1975.

Jacques Maclès played for France in the Chess Olympiad:

- In 1974, at the first board in the 21st Chess Olympiad in Nice (+6, =7, -4).
