= Éric Prié =

French chess grandmaster (born 1962)

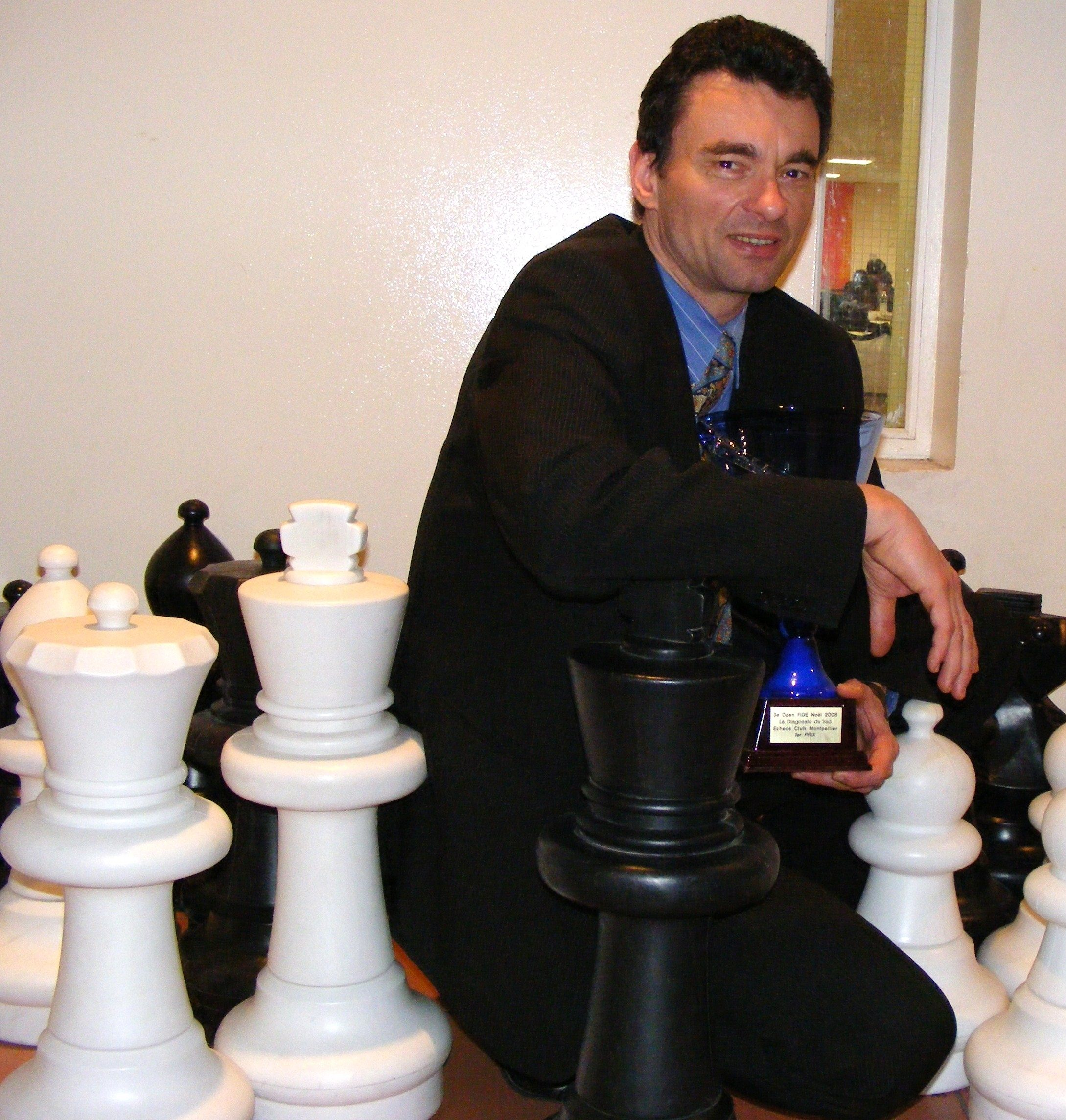
- Éric Prié receiving first prize in the 2008 Montpellier international open.

Personal information
- Born: March 4, 1962 (age 64)

Chess career
- Country: France
- Title: Grandmaster (1995)
- Peak rating: 2532 (October 2007)

Éric Prié (French pronunciation: [eʁik pʁiˈje]), born 14 March 1962 in Paris, is a French chess player, International Grandmaster since 1996, currently playing for Montpellier Échecs. He won the title of French Champion in 1995 and of Paris Champion in 1982, 1983, 1992 and 1996. He was part of the French team in the 29th, 31st, and 32nd Olympiads.

On the March 2011 FIDE list, Prié has an Elo rating of 2508, ranking 737th in the world and 26th in France.

== Chess Activities ==
=== In the French Chess Federation ===
Prié is an FFE trainer and teacher to trainers. He was the national technical director of the French federation from September 1998 to October 2001, then national trainer to the young players until July 2005. As such, he was one of the trainers of Étienne Bacrot, Laurent Fressinet, Maxime Vachier-Lagrave and Marie Sebag.

=== Blindfold Play ===
Prié is considered France's top blindfold player. He gave many simultaneous exhibitions without seeing the board, against up to 16 opponents.

=== Verses ===
Prié wrote several texts in verses, some of which related to chess, such as those dedicated to the young French player Jules Moussard and the former president of the French Chess Federation, Jean-Claude Loubatière.

== The Prié Attack ==
Position: a8 black rook, b8 black knight, c8 black bishop, d8 black queen, e8 black king, f8 black bishop, g8 black knight, h8 black rook, a7 black pawn, b7 black pawn, c7 black pawn, e7 black pawn, f7 black pawn, g7 black pawn, h7 black pawn, d5 black pawn, d4 white pawn, a3 white pawn, b2 white pawn, c2 white pawn, e2 white pawn, f2 white pawn, g2 white pawn, h2 white pawn, a1 white rook, b1 white knight, c1 white bishop, d1 white queen, e1 white king, f1 white bishop, g1 white knight, h1 white rook

The Prié Attack

Prié gave his name to an opening, the Prié Attack (ECO D00, Closed Game) : 1.d4 d5 2.a3 (diagram). He explained that this move prevents Black from playing the useful move Bb4 and, in some variations, prepares the b2-b4 pawn advance. The latter idea is akin to playing a Slav Defense, Chebanenko Variation (also called Chameleon Variation), with reversed colors. Other move orders transpose into this system, e.g. 1.d4 e6 2.a3 d5.

This opening addresses the problem of excessive theoretical preparation among high-level chess players by playing a sane but unusual system, which forces Black to think from the start of the game instead of reciting moves learnt by heart. Prié reached that goal by successfully playing his opening against amateurs, but also against titled players.

=== Notable Game ===
Prié vs. Flear, Lattes 2005

Position: d8 black rook, b7 black bishop, f7 black king, b6 black pawn, d6 black rook, g6 black pawn, h6 black pawn, a5 black pawn, d5 black pawn, d4 white rook, g4 white pawn, a3 white pawn, e3 white pawn, f3 white bishop, g3 white king, b2 white pawn, f2 white pawn, d1 white rook

Position after 29…Rd7-d8

The following game was played by Éric Prié against British grandmaster Glenn Flear in 2005, in Lattes.

1.d4 d5 2.a3 Nf6 3.Nf3 Nbd7 4.Bf4 g6 5.h3 Bg7 6.e3 0–0 7.Nbd2 b6 8.c3 Bb7 9.Qb3 Ne4 10.Rd1 Nxd2 11.Rxd2 e5 12.dxe5 Qe7 13.Be2 Nxe5 14.Nxe5 Bxe5 15.Bxe5 Qxe5 16.0–0 Rfd8 17.Rfd1 Rd6 18.Bf3 Rad8 19.Qa4 a5 20.c4 c6 21.cxd5 cxd5

Black now has an isolated central pawn, but he cannot use the c and e columns. Moreover, White can efficiently blockade this pawn, which is thus a weakness for Black.

22.Rd4 Qe7 23.Rc1 Qd7 24.Qxd7 R8xd7 25.Rcd1 f5 26.g4 fxg4 27.hxg4 h6 28.Kg2 Kf7 29.Kg3 Rd8 (diagram)

30.e4!!

In spite of appearance, it turns out that the d5-pawn is not sufficiently protected.

30...Ke6 31.exd5+ Bxd5 32.Bxd5+ Rxd5 33.Re1+ Kf6 34.Rf4 Kg5 35.Rf7 Rd3+ 36.f3 R8d5 37.Re6 h5 38.Rff6 hxg4 39.Rxg6+ Kf5 40.Kh4!!

Threatening Rgf6 mate.

40...Kf4 41.Rgf6+ Rf5 42.fxg4 Rxf6 43.Rxf6+ Ke4 44.Rxb6 1–0 (Black resigns).
