= Pierre Rolland (chess player) =

French chess player (1926–1967)

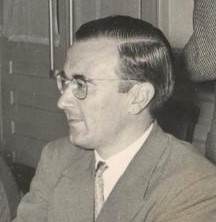

Personal information
- Born: Pierre Auguste Marie Rolland; September 9, 1926 Bram, Aude
- Died: 10 February 1967 (aged 40) Castelnau-Rivière-Basse

Chess career
- Country: France

Pierre Auguste Marie Rolland (9 September 1926 — 10 February 1967) was a French chess player who won the French Chess Championship in 1956. He competed in several French championships, finishing 3rd in 1959, 2nd in 1961 and 1962, 3rd= in 1963, 2nd= in 1965, and 1st= in 1966 (losing on tiebreak). He also won the 1955 Paris championship. He was a professor of philosophy.

At his only international tournament in Le Havre, 1966, Rolland performed creditably, scoring 6/11 and defeating grandmasters Aleksandar Matanovic and Milko Bobotsov, which qualified him for an International Master norm. (The tournament was convincingly won by Bent Larsen). He was invited to play in the Monaco 1967 chess tournament alongside Bobby Fischer, Vasily Smyslov and other leading grandmasters, but died in a car crash two months before it began.

== Bibliography ==
- Roux, Tristan (1974). Florilège des échecs en France [Anthology of French chess]. Paris: Payot. p. 156. ISBN 978-2-228-15200-6.
