= Abraham Baratz =

Romanian-French chess player

Abraham Baratz (14 September 1895, Bessarabia – 1975, Paris) was a Romanian–French chess master.

== History ==
In 1924, Baratz took 2nd, behind Eugene Znosko-Borovsky, in Paris. In 1925, he tied for 1st with Vitaly Halberstadt in the 1st Paris City Chess Championship. In 1925, he took 3rd in Paris (Victor Kahn and Bertrand won). In January 1926, he won ahead of Dawid Janowski in Hyères. In 1926, he took 2nd, behind Leon Schwartzmann, in Paris (2nd Championship). In 1926, he took 5th in Scarborough (el.). In 1926, he won ahead of Max Romih in Paris. In March 1927, he took 4th in Hyères. In 1927, he won in the 3rd Paris Championship. In 1927/28, he tied for 1st-2nd with George Koltanowski in Hastings (Major). In 1928, he won in the 4th Paris Championship, followed by Josef Cukierman, Schwartzmann, etc. In 1929, he tied for 2nd-4th, behind Savielly Tartakower in Paris. In 1930, he tied for 1st-2nd with Wechsler in Bucharest. In 1930, he took 2nd, behind Taubmann, in Bucharest (Quadrangular). In 1930/31, he took 6th in Hastings (Major; Salo Flohr won).

Baratz played twice for Romania in the Chess Olympiads; at first board (+6 –4 =5) at Hamburg 1930, and at third board (+7 –3 =7) at Prague 1931. Then he emigrated to France.

In 1931, he tied for 2nd-3rd with Stefano Rosselli del Turco, behind Brian Reilly, in Nice. In 1933, he tied for 3rd-4th with Andor Lilienthal in Paris (Alexander Alekhine won). In 1938, he took 3rd in Paris (L'Echiquier; Baldur Hoenlinger won). In 1939, he took 4th in Paris (15th Championship; Nicolas Rossolimo won).
