= Miodrag Todorčević =

Serbian-French chess grandmaster and coach (born 1940)

Personal information
- Born: November 10, 1940 (age 85) Belgrade, Serbia

Chess career
- Country: Yugoslavia/Serbia (until 1968; 1977–2003); France (1968–1977); Spain (since 2003)
- Title: Grandmaster (1989)
- Peak rating: 2550 (January 1990)
- Peak ranking: No. 75 (January 1990)

Miodrag Todorčević (Миодраг Тодорчевић; born 10 November 1940, in Belgrade) a Serbian-French chess grandmaster and coach.

In his chess career, he represented Yugoslavia/Serbia (till 1968 and 1977–2003), France (1968–1977), and Spain (since 2003).

He won five times in Paris City Chess Championship (1966, 1967, 1973, 1974, 1976) and won French Chess Championship at Dijon 1975.

Todorcevic played twice for France in Chess Olympiads in 1972 and 1974. In 1987, Todorcevic participated in an Interzonal Tournament in Szirak, Hungary, and scored 50%.

He was awarded the Grandmaster title in 1989. His current Elo rating is 2450.
