= Joël Lautier =

French chess grandmaster and businessman (born 1973)

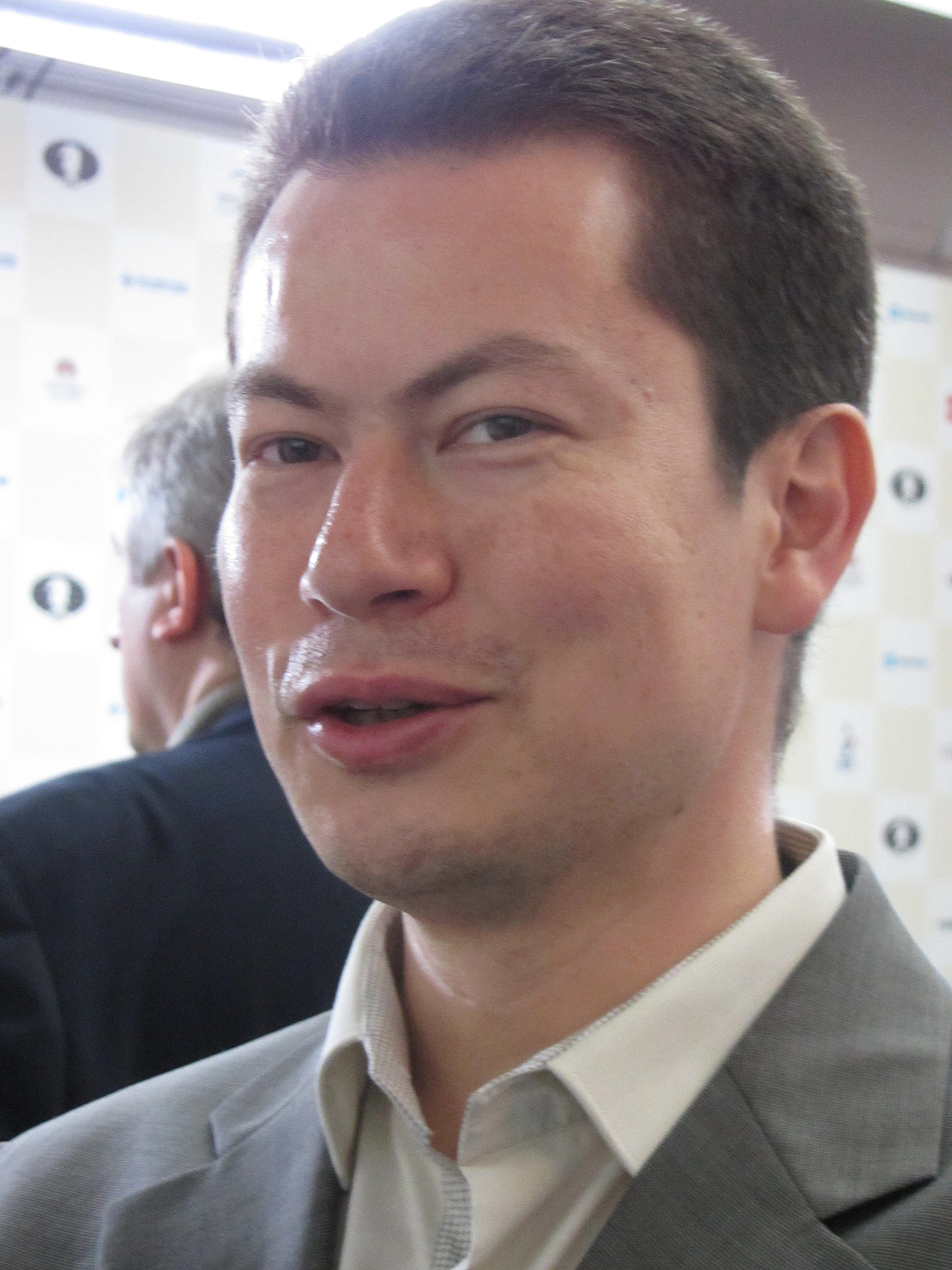
- Lautier in 2012

Personal information
- Born: April 12, 1973 (age 53) Scarborough, Ontario, Canada
- Spouses: Almira Skripchenko (m. 1997; div. 2002) Alissa Lautier (m. 2007)

Chess career
- Country: France
- Title: Grandmaster (1990)
- Years active: 1985–2009
- FIDE rating: 2658 (November 2026)
- Peak rating: 2687 (January 2002)
- Peak ranking: No. 13 (January 1995)

Joël Lautier (French pronunciation: [ʒɔɛl lotje]) is a French chess grandmaster and one of the world's leading chess players in the 1990s and early 2000s. In 1986, he won the U-14 World Youth Chess Championship in Puerto Rico, Argentina. In 1988, he won the World Junior Chess Championship, ahead of stars such as Vasily Ivanchuk, Boris Gelfand and Gregory Serper. He is the youngest player ever to win the World Junior Championship at the age of 15. He is one of the few players who has a lifetime positive score against Garry Kasparov. He was one of the people instrumental in Kramnik winning the 2000 World Championship against Kasparov by preparing the infamous 'Berlin Wall'. He also won the French Chess Championship twice in 2004 and 2005. He was the first president of the Association of Chess Professionals when it was founded in June 2003. In 2006, Lautier gave up competitive chess to pursue a career in investment banking. Since 2009 he has been CEO of the Moscow-based investment banking firm RGG Capital.

== Early life ==
Joel Lautier was born in Ontario, Canada on April 12, 1973. His father was French and his mother was Japanese. Later on, the family moved to France. He started playing chess when he was three and a half years old. His father introduced him to the game of chess. His father was a pretty decent player – rated around 2200 who often gave him interesting puzzles and quizzes and kept him interested in the game. He progressed quite quickly due to this. When he was 11, he started to beat his father on a regular basis. He dropped out of school when he was 16 as he wanted to focus more on chess tournaments.

== Chess career ==
Lautier won the Paris Championship for under-10 and then the under-10 French national title. In 1986, he participated in the U-14 World Championship in Puerto Rico, Argentina. Interestingly, his main competitors in that tournament were Sofia Polgar and Judit Polgar. He beat Sofia and drew against Judit. Eventually, he won the event with a good margin of 1½ points, ahead of both the Polgar sisters. He worked with his father until he got his first world title in 1986, and then he trained with an IM named Didier Sellos.

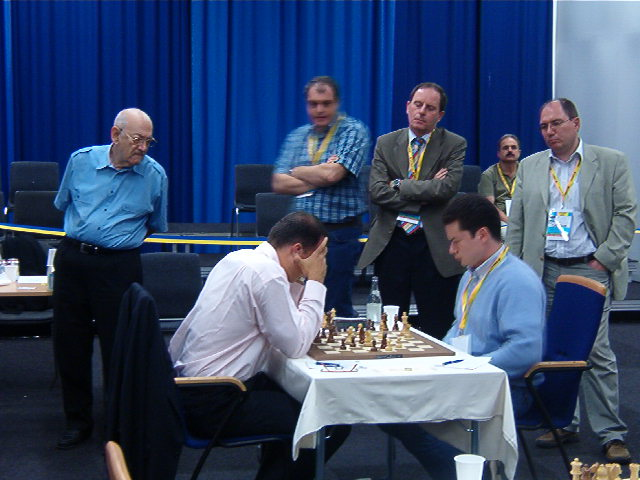
Lautier playing with Sokolov with Korchnoi looking at the board

In 1988, at the age of 15, he won the World Junior Chess Championship in Adelaide, Australia. In this tournament, Joel was competing against stars such as Boris Gelfand, Vasyl Ivanchuk, Vladimir Akopian, Gregory Serper and Susan Polgar. Gelfand, Ivanchuk and Serper tied with him for the first place, but the tiebreak was the most number of wins and thanks to that Lautier became the youngest World Junior Champion; a record which is intact to date. The same year he became an International Master.

In 1990, he became an International Grandmaster and also won the zonal tournament with 10/12 which qualified him to the inter-zonal. He started well at the inter-zonal with 3½/4, beating strong players like Michael Adams, Vaganian and Yudasin but he lost to Viswanathan Anand and Alexei Shirov towards the end of the tournament and failed to qualify for the candidates’ matches. During this time, Lautier also improved his Russian, which he would learn to a fluent level alongside French, English and Japanese.

Lautier was a long-time leader of his national team at Chess Olympiad and, with him at the helm, France turned from a country that finished mid-table in the Tournament of nations into a mighty chess nation. Lautier performed well at the 1993 interzonal tournament, qualifying for the candidates’ matches under FIDE rules. He triumphed in over 30 international tournaments and national club championships in France, Netherlands, Austria, Germany, Switzerland, and Spain. Besides Vasyl Ivanchuk, he is the only grandmaster who defeated every world champion of his time; he beat Anatoly Karpov, Garry Kasparov, Vladimir Kramnik, Alexander Khalifman, Vishwanathan Anand, Ruslan Ponomariov, Rustam Kasimdzhanov, and Veselin Topalov. He is one of the few players who has a positive score of +2−1=7 against Garry Kasparov. He was the second of Vladimir Kramnik during the Classical World Chess Championship 2000 against Garry Kasparov.

Despite all his success, Lautier never competed for the world championship. He served as a trainer as part of Vladimir Kramnik’s team when he helped his friend to overcome Garry Kasparov in the 2000 World Championship. He is one of the founders of the Association of Chess Professionals and was the ACP President from 2004 to 2005. Since 2009, Lautier has been focusing on his business/professional activities.

== Personal life ==
In 1997, he married International Master Almira Skripchenko, who was one of the strongest women chess players in late 1990s and early 2000s. They divorced in 2002. In 2007, he married his second wife Alissa with whom he has a daughter named Naomi and a son named David.

== Business career ==
After his professional chess career, he turned to business in 2006 and became an investment banker in Russia. He founded his own corporate finance advisory firm RGG Capital, which specialised in advising Western companies in cross-border M&A transactions in Russia and other countries of the former Soviet Union. He also graduated in 2014 with an MBA from the Skolkovo school of management in Moscow.

In 2020, he became a non-executive director and member of the supervisory board of the Russian bank Sovcombank. For that reason, the US added him in March 2022 to the list of sanctioned people over the Russian invasion of Ukraine. The same day Anatoly Karpov was also added to the US sanctions list with Lautier. French business newspaper Les Echos called the US sanctioning Lautier 'bizarre' and noted him having already resigned from his position in the bank on 25 February, the day after the bank itself was placed on the sanctions list. As of June 2023, Lautier is no longer on the sanction list after OFAC in the US Department of Treasury accepted a petition he filed challenging the validity of his designation.

He currently resides in Spain, where he has been living for many years.

== Notable games ==
Kasparov vs. Lautier, 1994

Position: g1 white king, f1 white rook, g2 white pawn, f2 white pawn, d2 white bishop, h3 white pawn, e3 white queen, d3 black knight, d4 white knight, c4 black queen, h6 black pawn, e6 black bishop, g7 black pawn, f7 black pawn, f8 black king, d8 black queen

Final position
- Garry Kasparov vs. Joel Lautier, Mar-13, Linares 1994, round 13, Italian Game: Classical Variation, Giuoco Pianissimo, 0–1.
- Joel Lautier vs. Peter Leko, Feb-10, Ubeda 1997, round 5, Sicilian Defense: Scheveningen. Fianchetto Variation (B80), 1–0.
- Veselin Topalov vs. Joel Lautier, Oct-30, Tilburg Fontys 1998, round 7, Sicilian Defense: Lasker-Pelikan. Sveshnikov Variation Novosibirsk Variation, 0–1.
- Joel Lautier vs. Anatoly Karpov, Apr-14, Dortmund 1993, round 4, English Opening: King's English. Four Knights Variation Fianchetto Lines, 1–0.
- Joel Lautier vs. Viswanathan Anand, Mar-01, Linares 1994, round 5, Gruenfeld Defense: Exchange. Modern Exchange Variation, 1–0.
- Joel Lautier vs. Ivan Sokolov, Mar-01, Linares 1995, round 1, Catalan Opening: General, 1–0.
- Joel Lautier vs. Victor Bologan, Mar-11, Enghien-les-Bains 3rd 1999, round 8, Caro-Kann Defense: Accelerated Panov Attack. Modern Variation, 1–0.
