= César Boutteville =

French chess player (1917–2015)

Personal information
- Born: 24 June 1917 Thin-Hao, French Indochina
- Died: 21 May 2015 (aged 97) Versailles, France

Chess career
- Country: France
- Peak rating: 2290 (July 1971)

César Boutteville (24 June 1917 – 21 May 2015) was a French chess master.

== Biography & Career ==
The son of a French father and a Vietnamese mother, Cesar Boutteville was born in Thin-Hao (or Thịnh Hào), nowadays part of Hanoi's urban district Dong Da. He moved with his family to France in 1929. After settling in Boulogne-sur-Mer, the young César continued his education in Roubaix.

He was a six-time winner of both the French Chess Championship (1945, 1950, 1954, 1955, 1959, and 1967) and the Paris City Chess Championship (1944, 1945, 1946, 1952, 1961, and 1972).

Boutteville represented France seven times in Chess Olympiads from 1956 to 1968. He also played in friendly matches against Switzerland (1946), Australia (1946), Czechoslovakia (1947) and the Soviet Union (1954).

He took third at Paris 1962/63 (Albéric O'Kelly de Galway won), shared 10th at Bordeaux, and tied for eighth at Le Havre 1966 (Bent Larsen won).

When he was over 90 years old, after a long break, he returned to play for the Le Chesnay club.

He died in his home in Versailles on 21 May 2015.
