= Brian Reilly =

Irish chess Master, writer and magazine editor

Brian Patrick Reilly (12 December 1901 in Menton, France – 29 December 1991 in Hastings, England) was an Irish chess Master, writer and magazine editor.

He was born at Menton on the French Riviera. The Irish connection goes back to his paternal grandfather, who came from Kells in County Meath.

When in his early twenties, Reilly joined his father's firm in the pharmaceutical business. The company did very well, but was hit hard when Britain left the Gold standard system in the early 1930s. Reilly was interned in Vichy France during World War II. He returned to England after the war ended, and became a full-time chess editor and writer.

Reilly won the Nice Club championship in 1924. He shared 5th place at Hyères 1927 (Wilhelm Orbach won). He took 10th at Nice 1930 (Savielly Tartakower won). In 1931, Reilly won in Nice, and took 5th at Nice (Pentangular, Alexander Alekhine won). He tied for 4-6th at Margate 1935 (Samuel Reshevsky won). In 1935, he took 5th in Barcelona (Salo Flohr and George Koltanowski won), and tied for 5-7th in Rosas (Flohr won). In 1937, he took 4th in Nice (Quadrangular; Alekhine won). In 1938, he took 2nd, behind Karel Opočensky, in Nice.

Reilly represented Ireland in nine Chess Olympiads in 1935, and 1954–1968 (three times at first board). He was 'exceedingly chuffed' with a win against super-class U.S. Grandmaster Reuben Fine during the 6th Olympiad, Warsaw 1935. He won the Irish Championship in 1959 and 1960.

He was the editor of British Chess Magazine from 1949 to 1981, the longest-serving editor of that magazine. He actually purchased control of the magazine in the early 1950s, when it was in financial straits, and turned it into a profitable business.
