= Amédée Gibaud =

French chess player

Amédée (Aimé) Gibaud (5 March 1885, in Rochefort-sur-Mer – 18 August 1957, in Rochefort-sur-Mer) was a French chess master.

He won the French Chess Championship four times (1928, 1930, 1935, 1940) and won the French correspondence championship three times (1929, 1931, 1932). He tied for fourth/fifth at Ramsgate 1929 (Premier A, William Gibson won).

Gibaud played for France in 1st unofficial Chess Olympiad at Paris 1924, and 3rd unofficial Chess Olympiad at Munich 1936.

== Apocryphal game ==
Gibaud vs. Lazard (apocryphal),
Paris 1924

Position: a8 black rook, b8 black knight, c8 black bishop, d8 black queen, e8 black king, f8 black bishop, h8 black rook, a7 black pawn, b7 black pawn, c7 black pawn, d7 black pawn, f7 black pawn, g7 black pawn, h7 black pawn, e5 white pawn, e3 black knight, h3 white pawn, a2 white pawn, b2 white pawn, c2 white pawn, d2 white knight, e2 white pawn, f2 white pawn, g2 white pawn, a1 white rook, c1 white bishop, d1 white queen, e1 white king, f1 white bishop, g1 white knight, h1 white rook

Position following 1. d4 Nf6 2. Nd2 e5 3. dxe5 Ng4 4. h3 Ne3

A very short miniature attributed to Gibaud and Frédéric Lazard is frequently reproduced in chess literature, sometimes with the claim that it was the shortest game ever played between masters in a formal setting. In its shortest and most commonly reproduced version, the game consists of four moves by each player. Black (Lazard) rapidly develops his king's knight to e3 after White (Gibaud) weakens the defense of the square.

Gibaud vs. Lazard (apocryphal), Paris 1924
1. d4 Nf6 2. Nd2 e5 3. dxe5 Ng4 4. h3 Ne3 0–1 (Resignation)

In the final position White is unable to prevent the capture of his queen, because doing so would allow Black to force checkmate: 5. fxe3 Qh4+ 6. g3 Qxg3#.

The four-move, "formal" version of the game is not accepted as a real historical event. Gibaud denied having ever lost a serious game in four moves, instead suggesting that he may have lost a casual skittles game against Lazard involving similar positional themes, albeit with more than four moves played. Gibaud also suggested that his game with Lazard might have been confused with a previously published "theoretical" miniature. Although the four-move version of the game is not accepted as historically accurate, it illustrates several principles of gameplay: the possibility for rapid development to cause serious problems for an opponent, the importance of not weakening the defense of critical squares, and the importance of defending a structural weakness on the kingside in the initial phase of the game (especially involving the f- and g- pawns), which if left unguarded may lead to a quick checkmate, akin to Fool's mate.
