= Didier Sellos =

French chess player (born 1957)

Personal information
- Born: 20 February 1957 (age 69) Paris, France

Chess career
- Country: France
- Title: International Master (1983)
- Peak rating: 2455 (January 1996)

Didier Sellos (born 20 February 1957) is a French chess International Master (IM) (1983), French Chess Championship silver medalist (1979), Paris City Chess Championship two-times winner (1981, 1988).

== Biography ==
In the end of 1970s to the end of 1980s Didier Sellos was one of the leading French chess players. In 1976/1977 in Groningen he participated in European and World Junior Chess Championships. In 1979 in Courchevel Didier Sellos shared 1st with Bachar Kouatly in French Chess Championship but lost additional play-off 1:3. Also he twice won Paris City Chess Championship: in 1981 and 1988. In 1983, Didier Sellos was awarded the FIDE International Master (IM) title.

Didier Sellos played for France in the Chess Olympiad:

- In 1978, at first reserve board in the 23rd Chess Olympiad in Buenos Aires (+3, =2, -2).

Didier Sellos played for France in the World Youth U26 Team Chess Championship:

- In 1981, at fourth board in the 3rd World Youth U26 Team Chess Championship in Graz (+4, =4, -2).

Didier Sellos played for France in the Men's Chess Mitropa Cup:

- In 1977, at third board in the 2nd Chess Mitropa Cup in Bad Kohlgrub (+2, =1, -2) and won team bronze medal,
- In 1979, at first board in the 4th Chess Mitropa Cup in Bern (+1, =1, -4).
