= Leon Schwartzmann =

Polish-French chess player

Leon Schwartzmann (Szwarcman, Szwarzman, Schwarzman, Schwarzmann) (1887, Warsaw – 1942, Auschwitz) was a Polish–French chess master.

He was born in Warsaw, Poland (then Russian Empire) into a Jewish family, and studied in Sankt Petersburg. In 1911, he tied for 5-6th in St Petersburg (Ilya Rabinovich and Platz won). In 1913, he took 2nd, behind Platz, in St Petersburg.

After World War I, he lived in Poland. In 1919, he took 6th in Warsaw (Zdzislaw Belsitzmann won). In 1924, he tied for 3rd-4th with Dawid Przepiórka, behind Alexander Flamberg and Moishe Lowtzky won).

In the middle of the 1920s, he moved to France. In 1926, Schwartzmann won the 2nd Paris City Chess Championship. In 1927, he tied for 2nd-3rd with Henry Grob, behind Wilhelm Orbach, in Hyères. In 1927, he tied for 10-12th in Paris (Abraham Baratz won). In 1928, he tied for 2nd-3rd with Josef Cukierman, behind Baratz, in the 4th Paris Championship. In 1929, he tied for 8-9th in Paris (Savielly Tartakower won). In 1936, he played in the 12th Paris Championship (Nicolas Rossolimo won).

During World War II, he was arrested and transported to Auschwitz, where he was murdered on 3 September 1942.
