= Axel Delorme =

French chess grandmaster (born 1990)

Personal information
- Born: May 8, 1990 (age 36) Lyon, France

Chess career
- Country: France
- Title: Grandmaster (2017)
- FIDE rating: 2481 (July 2026)
- Peak rating: 2528 (February 2018)

Axel Delorme is a French chess grandmaster.

== Chess career ==
In April 2010, he won the French Junior Chess Championship.

Delorme earned his GM norms at the:

- XIII Festival Scacchistico Internazionale "Citta di Amantea" in September 2015
- XVIII Open de Sants, Hostafrancs I la Bordeta Grup A in August 2016
- Xtracon Chess Open in July 2017

In June 2016, he played for the Clichy club in the French Team Championship. The team won the championship, two points ahead of runner-up team Bischwiller.
