= Thal Abergel =

French chess grandmaster (born 1982)

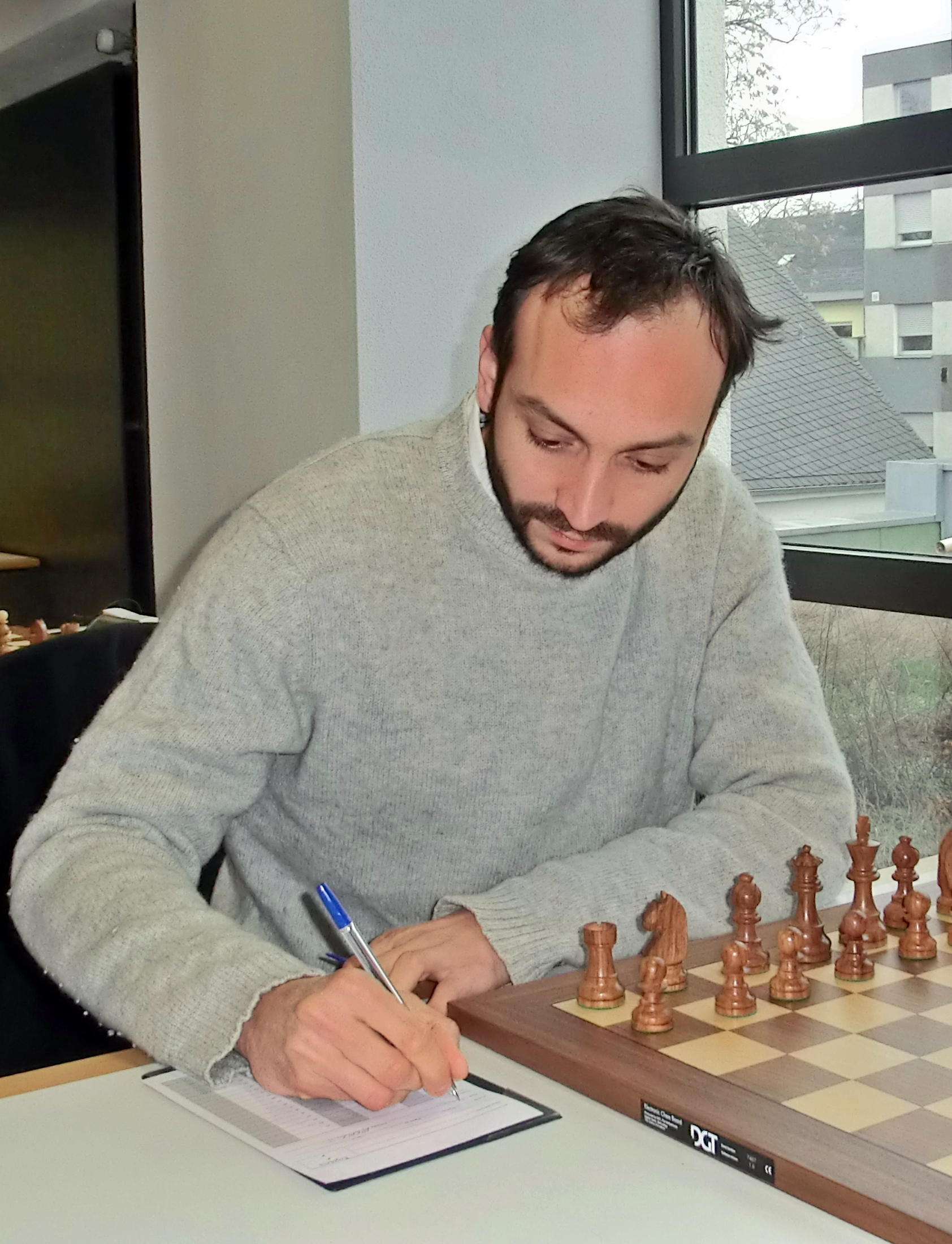
- Thal Abergel, 2014

Personal information
- Native name: טל אברג'יל
- Born: 13 October 1982 (age 43) Haifa, Israel

Chess career
- Country: France
- Title: Grandmaster (2008)
- Peak rating: 2547 (March 2010)

Thal Abergel (Hebrew: טל אברג'יל; born 13 October 1982) is a French chess Grandmaster.

In November 2003 when he was an International master, Abergel won his first 4NCL game in 15 moves.

Thal became a Grandmaster in 2008.
