= Wilhelm Orbach =

German chess player

Wilhelm Orbach (1894, Offenbach am Main – 1944, Auschwitz) was a German chess master. He was murdered in the Holocaust.

He took 3rd at Oeynhausen 1922 (22nd DSB–Congress, B tourn); took 4th at Frankfurt 1923 (23rd DSB–Congress, B tourn); tied for 3rd-4th at Breslau 1925 (24th DSB–Congress, B tourn); won at Frankfurt am Main 1925 (City championship); took 2nd at Ems 1926 (Quadrangular).

Orbach won at Hyères 1927; took 4th at Homburg 1927 (Efim Bogoljubow won); tied for 4-5th at Giessen 1928 (Richard Réti won); took 11th at Duisburg 1929 (26th DSB–Congress, Carl Ahues won); took 12th at Frankfurt 1930 (Aron Nimzowitsch won); took 6th at Paris (L'Echiquier) 1938 (Baldur Hoenlinger won).

He was murdered in the Auschwitz concentration camp.
