= Adrien Demuth =

French-Swiss chess grandmaster (born 1991)

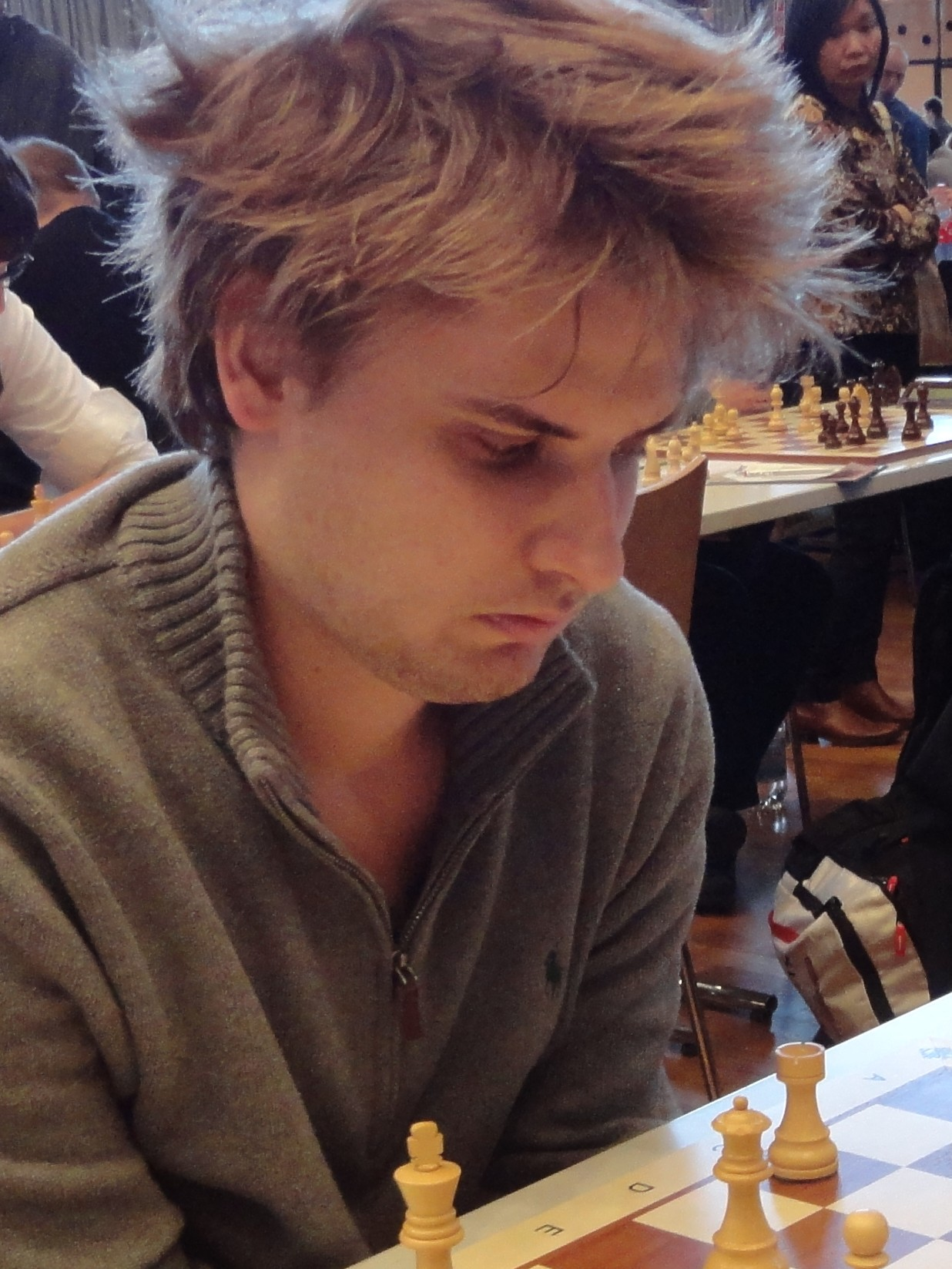
- Adrien Demuth, Karlsruhe 2016

Personal information
- Born: 14 April 1991 (age 35) Saint-Denis, Réunion, France

Chess career
- Country: France (until 2026); Switzerland (since 2026)
- Title: Grandmaster (2015)
- FIDE rating: 2518 (July 2026)
- Peak rating: 2562 (September 2015)

Adrien Demuth (born 14 April 1991) is a French-Swiss chess grandmaster.

== Chess career ==
Born in 1991, Demuth earned his international master title in 2011 and his grandmaster title in 2015. He is the No. 14 ranked French player as of March 2018.
