= Baldur Hönlinger =

Austrian chess player

Personal information
- Born: Rudolf Spielmann; 7 July 1905 Vienna, Austria-Hungary
- Died: 12 March 1990 (aged 84) Wuppertal, West Germany

Chess career
- Country: Austro-Hungarian Empire → Austria

Baldur Hönlinger (Hoenlinger) (7 July 1905 – 12 March 1990) was an Austrian chess master who participated in tournaments and competitions from the 1920s to the 1950s.

A native of Vienna, Baldur Hönlinger played at first board (+8 -3 =4) for Austria in 2nd Chess Olympiad at The Hague 1928.

He won at Vienna 1928, lost a match to Rudolf Spielmann in 1929, took 11th at Rogaška Slatina (Rohitsch-Sauerbrunn) 1929 (Akiba Rubinstein won), shared 1st with Gedeon Barcza at Szolnok 1930, tied for 3rd-4th at Győr 1930 (Isaac Kashdan won), took 2nd, behind Albert Becker, at Vienna 1931 (Trebitsch Memorial), shared 2nd, behind Karl Gilg, at Konstantinsbad 1935, won at Vienna 1936, took 8th at Vienna 1936 (Trebitsch Memorial, Henryk Friedman won), and won at Paris (L'Echiquier) 1938.

After World War II, Hönlinger lived in West Germany. He tied for 9-10th at Weidenau 1947 (Georg Kieninger won), lost a match to Wolfgang Unzicker (2:4) in 1948, shared 14th at Bad Pyrmont 1949 (Efim Bogoljubow won), and tied for 11th-12th at Vienna 1951 (Schlechter Memorial, Moshe Czerniak won).

Baldur Hönlinger died in Wuppertal at the age of 84.
