= Nicolas Rossolimo =

Russian-born chess player (1910–1975)

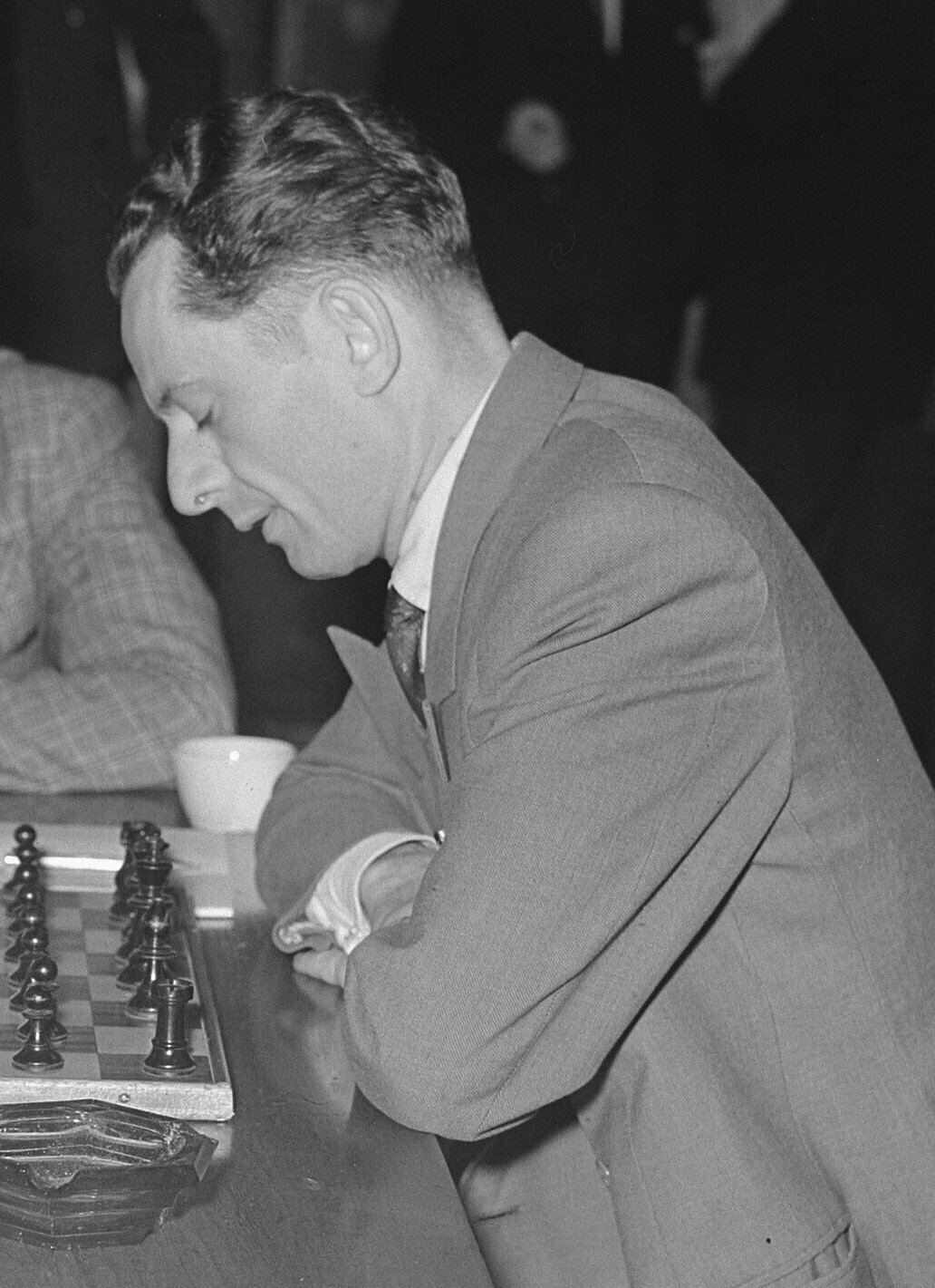
- Rossolimo in 1950

Personal information
- Born: Nikolay Spiridonovich Rossolimo; February 28, 1910 Kiev, Russian Empire
- Died: July 24, 1975 (aged 65) New York City, U.S.

Chess career
- Country: United States (1952–72); France (1930–52; 1972–75); Greece (1929–30); Soviet Union (until 1929)
- Title: Grandmaster (1953)

Nicolas Rossolimo (Russian: Николай Спиридонович Россолимо, romanized: Nikolay Spiridonovich Rossolimo; February 28, 1910 – July 24, 1975) was a Russian-born chess player. After acquiring Greek citizenship in 1929, he was able to emigrate that year to France, and was many times chess champion of Paris. In 1952 he emigrated to the United States, and won the 1955 U.S. Open Chess Championship. He was awarded the title of International Grandmaster by FIDE in 1953. Rossolimo was a resident of New York City until his death.

The Rossolimo Variation of the Sicilian Defence bears his name.

== Biography and chess career ==
Nikolai Spiridonovich Rossolimo was born into an upper-middle-class Russian-Greek family in Kiev, Russia (present-day Ukraine). His father was Spiridon Rossolimo, a Russian painter and portraitist of Greek ancestry, while his mother Kseniya Nikolayevna (née Skugarevskaya) was an aristocratic writer and war correspondent. He was a nephew of the famous Russian neurologist and psychiatrist Grigory Ivanovich Rossolimo. He lived in Moscow during the mid-1920s, and moved to Paris with his Russian mother in 1929.

Having finished second behind former World Champion José Raúl Capablanca in a tournament in Paris in 1938, he won the French Championship in 1948. He was Paris champion a record seven times, and drew two matches in 1948 and 1949 with Savielly Tartakower. In 1955, he won the U.S. Open Championship held in Long Beach, California, on tiebreaks ahead of Samuel Reshevsky. The prize was a new Buick automobile.

Rossolimo played for France in the Chess Olympiads of 1950 and 1972, and for the United States in 1958, 1960, and 1966. FIDE awarded him the International Master title in 1950 and the International Grandmaster title in 1953.

In 1952, he moved to the U.S. with his wife Véra and son Alexander to rejoin his mother and Russian-Greek father in New York. (After moving to the U.S., his first name was often spelled "Nicholas".) In New York, he worked as a waiter, a taxi driver, played the accordion, and worked as a singer and ran a chess studio as well to support himself and his family. The Rossolimo Chess Studio was located in Greenwich Village in Manhattan. It was somewhat like a café that served food and drinks, and also sold chess sets and books, but where members of the public – including famous artists such as Marcel Duchamp – could come and play chess with each other and occasionally play Rossolimo himself for a fee (Rossolimo would play simultaneous chess with many of the patrons).

== Death ==
Rossolimo died of head injuries following a fall down a flight of stairs, just after finishing third in his final event, the 1975 World Open, in New York City. He was buried in a Russian Orthodox cemetery in New Jersey.

=== Chess talent ===
Position: a8 black bishop, c8 black rook, f8 black rook, h8 black king, a7 black pawn, c7 black queen, f7 black pawn, g7 black pawn, h7 black pawn, a6 white pawn, b6 black pawn, e6 black knight, f6 white knight, d5 black pawn, e5 white knight, d4 white pawn, g4 white queen, a3 white rook, b2 white pawn, f2 white pawn, g2 white pawn, h2 white pawn, e1 white rook, g1 white king

Rossolimo vs. Reissman, position after 22...Kh8

The strongest players Rossolimo defeated were Efim Bogoljubov, David Bronstein, and former World Champion Max Euwe, against whom he had two wins and a lifetime plus score. He also scored draws against four world champions: José Capablanca, Max Euwe, Bobby Fischer, and Vassily Smyslov. According to the site Chessmetrics, which estimates historical ratings of players based on results, his highest ranking was 15th in the world, reached in December 1953.

Rossolimo won many brilliancy and "best-game" prizes for his beautiful chess games, and has been called an "artist of chess". He has been quoted to have said (here in translation): "What am I supposed to do, trade in my romantic style and become a hunter of points at any price? No, I will not do so. I will fight for the art of chess. I shall not turn into a monster".

Here is one of Rossolimo's most celebrated brilliancies. Al Horowitz, the late chess columnist for The New York Times, called this game "a brilliancy of astonishing character, elegant and explosive".

Rossolimo vs. Paul Reissman, San Juan 1967
1.e4 e5 2.Nf3 Nc6 3.Bc4 Bc5 4.c3 Nf6 5.d4 exd4 6.cxd4 Bb4+ 7.Bd2 Bxd2+ 8.Nbxd2 d5 9.exd5 Nxd5 10.Qb3 Nce7 11.0-0 c6 12.Rfe1 0-0 13.a4 b6? 14.Ne5 Bb7 15.a5 Rc8 16.Ne4 Qc7 17.a6! Ba8 18.Qh3 Nf4 19.Qg4 Ned5 20.Ra3 Ne6 21.Bxd5 cxd5 22.Nf6+ Kh8 (diagram) 23.Qg6!! Qc2 24.Rh3! 1–0

The Boston Globe wrote: "The truly talented Nicolas Rossolimo played one of the most amazing moves ever in Rossolimo–Reissman: 23.Qg6!!".

=== Legacy ===
Position: a8 black rook, c8 black bishop, d8 black queen, e8 black king, f8 black bishop, g8 black knight, h8 black rook, a7 black pawn, b7 black pawn, d7 black pawn, e7 black pawn, f7 black pawn, g7 black pawn, h7 black pawn, c6 black knight, b5 white bishop, c5 black pawn, e4 white pawn, f3 white knight, a2 white pawn, b2 white pawn, c2 white pawn, d2 white pawn, f2 white pawn, g2 white pawn, h2 white pawn, a1 white rook, b1 white knight, c1 white bishop, d1 white queen, e1 white king, h1 white rook

Rossolimo Variation. Black will continue with 3...g6, 3...d6, or 3...e6.

One of Rossolimo's more enduring innovations is the variation of the Sicilian Defence which bears his name – the Rossolimo Variation: 1.e4 c5 2.Nf3 Nc6 3.Bb5 (see diagram). While generally steering clear of the tactical fireworks common to open Sicilians, the Rossolimo Variation offers White some chance of an opening advantage.

=== Other ===
Rossolimo wrote two books: Les Echecs au coin du feu, a collection of his studies and endgames with a preface by Savielly Tartakower, published in Paris in 1947; and Rossolimo's Brilliancy Prizes, self-published in New York in 1970. He also made a record of songs in Russian, French, and English, with an album cover designed by Marcel Duchamp and produced by the Kismet Record Company. He is the hero of a chapter in the book, Losing Moses on the Freeway. He also held a brown belt in judo and recorded an album of Russian songs.

== Tournaments and matches ==
The following table gives Rossolimo's placings and scores in a number of major tournaments and matches. (The "Score" column gives the number of points / the total possible. The "+" indicates the number of won games, "−" the number of losses, and "=" the number of draws.)

Year	City	Tournament	+W−L=D	Score	Place
1931	Paris	Paris championship	+11−3=2	12/16	3-4
1934	Paris	Paris championship	+12−0=2	13/14	1
1937	Paris	Paris International Exposition			1
1938	Paris	International tournament	+6−1=3	7½/10	2
1939	Paris	International tournament	+9−0=5	11½/14	1
1947	Hilversum	European Zonal tournament	+5−5=3	6½/13	7–8
1948	Paris	French championship	+5−0=3	6½/8	1
1948	Beverwijk	Corus chess tournament	+3-2=4	5/9	3–4
1948	Bad Gastein	International tournament	+12−2=5	14½/19	2–3
1948	Paris	Match with Savielly Tartakower	+1−1=10	6/12	tie
1948/49	Hastings	Hastings International Chess Congress	+4−0=5	6½/9	1
1949	Southsea	International tournament	+8−0=2	9/10	1
1949	Heidelberg	International tournament	+4−1=4	6/9	2
1949	Trenčianske Teplice	International tournament	+9−4=6	12/19	4–5
1949	Gijón	International tournament	+9−0=2	10/11	1
1949	Venice	International tournament	+8−2=5	10½/15	2
1949	Paris	Match with Savielly Tartakower	+5−5=0	5/10	tie
1949/50	Hastings	Hastings International Chess Congress	+6−0=3	7½/9	2
1950	Beverwijk	Corus chess tournament	+4−1=4	6/9	2–3
1950	Gijón	International tournament	+7−1=3	8½/11	1
1950	Venice	International tournament	+7−2=6	10/15	3
1950	Amsterdam	International tournament	+5−2=12	11/19	8
1950	Mar del Plata	Mar del Plata chess tournament	+5−3=9	9½/17	8
1950	Dubrovnik	9th Chess Olympiad	+7−1=4	9/12	2
1950/51	Hastings	Hastings International Chess Congress	+5−1=3	6½/9	2–3
1951	Reykjavík	International tournament	+6−0=3	7½/9	1
1951	Southsea	International tournament	+6−0=4	8/12	1–2
1951	Bilbao	International tournament	+9−0=0	9/9	1
1951	A Coruña	International tournament		6½/8	1
1951	Vitoria	International tournament	+6−0=1	6½/7	1
1951	Birmingham	Howard Staunton Memorial Tournament	+4−2=9	8½/15	5–8
1952	Havana	International tournament	+9−4=7	12½/20	6
1952	Saarland	International tournament			1
1952	New York City	Match with Arthur Bisguier	+1−0=1	1½–½	won
1953	Milwaukee	U.S. Open Chess Championship			3–8
1953	Beverwijk	Corus chess tournament	+7−0=4	9/11	1
1954	Hollywood	Pan American Chess Championship			3–4
1954	New York City	U.S. Chess Championship	+3−2=8	7/13	6-7
1955	Long Beach	U.S. Open Chess Championship		10/12	1
1956	Washington, D.C.	Eastern States Open Championship	+4−0=3	5½/7	2-5
1957	Tarragona	International Tournament	+6−1=2	7/9	2
1958	Munich	13th Chess Olympiad	+6−1=8	10/15	3
1960	Leipzig	14th Chess Olympiad	+2−1=3	3½/6	
1965	New York City	U.S. Chess Championship		6/11	6
1966	Havana	17th Chess Olympiad	+5−1=4	7/10	
1967	Washington, D.C.	Eastern Open Chess Championship	+7−0=2	8/9	1
1967	Puerto Rico	Puerto Rico Open	+5−0=2	6/7	1
1968	Málaga	International tournament		5½/11	6–9
1969	Monte Carlo	All-grandmaster tournament		5½/11	7
1969	Vršac	International tournament		8½/15	6–8
1972	Skopje	20th Chess Olympiad	+7−6=4	9/17	
1975	New York City	World Open chess tournament	+7−1=1	7½/9	3
