= Joseph Cukierman =

Polish-born French chess master

Joseph (Józef, Iosif) Cukierman (Zukermann) (Gródek, Austria-Hungary, 28 March 1899 – Castres, France, 18 November 1940) was a Polish-born French chess master.

== Biography ==
Cukierman was won the second Moscow City Championship (1920/21). In early 1920s, Cukierman lived in Białystok, where he won a chess club championship in 1926. Then he emigrated to France.

In 1928, he tied for 2nd-3rd with Leon Schwartzmann, behind Abraham Baratz, in the 4th Paris City Championship. In 1929, he tied for 5-6th in Paris (Savielly Tartakower won). In 1930, he won, ahead of Tartakower, in the 6th Paris Championship. In 1931, he won in Paris. In 1933, he took 6th in Paris (Alexander Alekhine won). In 1938, Cukierman took 3rd, behind José Raúl Capablanca and Nicolas Rossolimo, in Paris. In 1939, he tied for 5-6th in Paris (Rossolimo won).

According to Alexander Alekhine, during World War II, he allegedly committed suicide in 1941.

== Notable chess games ==
- Teodor Regedziński vs Józef Cukierman, Warsaw 1926, Slav Defence, D12, 0-1
- Josef Cukierman vs Georges Koltanowski, Paris 1929, Philidor Defense, Exchange Variation, C41, 1-0
- Josef Cukierman vs Savielly Tartakower, Paris 1930, Indian Game, Capablanca Variation, A47, 1-0
