= Eugene Znosko-Borovsky =

Russian chess player, music and drama critic, teacher and author

Eugene Znosko-Borovsky

Eugene Znosko-Borovsky (Russian: Евге́ний Алекса́ндрович Зноско-Боро́вский, romanized: Yevgeny Alexandrovich Znosko-Borovsky; 16 August 1884 – 31 December 1954) was a Russian chess player, music and drama critic, teacher and author. Born in Pavlovsk, Saint Petersburg Governorate, he settled in Paris in 1920, and lived there for the rest of his life.

== Biography ==
Znosko-Borovsky learned to play chess as a young boy. He won prizes in local and regional tournaments, whilst progressing to a first-class education at the Tsarskoye Selo Lyceum.

Making his international chess tournament debut at Ostend in 1906, where he won the brilliancy prize for his game against Amos Burn, Znosko-Borovsky's playing career was frequently interrupted by other events in his life. Between 1909 and 1912 he was a prominent critic of the Modernist Apollo magazine, befriended many Russian poets and writers of the Silver Age, and was Nikolay Gumilev's second in his 1909 duel against Maximilian Voloshin. Decorated and wounded in military conflicts, he first served as a volunteer in the Russo-Japanese War of 1904 and 1905 and was again called into service during World War I. Following evacuation, he was taken by a British ship to Constantinople and from there proceeded to Paris, which remained his home from 1920 onwards.

As a player, Znosko-Borovsky fell short of the very highest level. He did have some notable results in international competition, including Paris 1930, where he finished first without loss, ahead of Savielly Tartakower, Andor Lilienthal and Jacques Mieses, and first prize in the premier tournament at Folkestone 1933. Success often came in individual encounters with his more distinguished peers; he won impressive games against José Raúl Capablanca, Akiba Rubinstein, Max Euwe and Efim Bogoljubov as well as a short match with Edgard Colle in 1922. He was also highly skilled at simultaneous exhibition play.

In conversation and as a lecturer, teacher or writer of chess, his abilities were widely acknowledged, particularly in Russia and France where he contributed regular articles and columns to magazines and newspapers. Indeed, it was in the field of writing that he excelled, penning many popular books including The Evolution of Chess (1910), Capablanca and The Muzio Gambit (both 1911). Capablanca and Alekhine followed World War I and most of his later offerings were translated into English, principally The Middle Game in Chess, How Not to Play Chess, How to Play the Chess Openings, How to Play Chess Endings (1940), and The Art of Chess Combination.

== Tribute ==
After hearing of his death, Gerald Abrahams wrote a personal tribute:

The death of Znosko-Borovsky deprives the chess world of one of the few survivors of an intellectually rich generation, the Russian Masters of the old regime ... My own memories of Znosko go back to 1923–24. I found him then, and at all times later, a stimulating friend and a delightful conversationalist in many subjects. His reputation as a dramatic and literary critic was, at one time considerable in Europe, though England knew little of this. Those who have read his chess works, however, must be aware that their writer was a kultur mensch in the best sense. Withal, he was stoical in adversity (adversity was always his lot) and possessed of great humour and resilience ... As a player, he suffered from the demands of a professionalism that is incompatible with great performance: but he leaves records of many games which reveal, if not genius, then a great talent ... those who knew him will all agree that his life enriched, and in a degree inspired, the chess world.

== Books ==
- Znosko-Borovsky, Eugene (1961) [1934]. How Not to Play Chess. Dover. ISBN 0-486-20920-2.
- Znosko-Borovsky, Eugene (1971) [1935]. How to Play The Chess Openings. Dover. ISBN 0-486-22795-2.
- Znosko-Borovsky, Eugene (2012) [1940]. How to Play Chess Endings. ISBN 978-0-486-21170-1.
- Znosko-Borovsky, Eugene (1977) [1936]. The Art of Chess Combination. Dover. ISBN 0-486-20583-5.
- Znosko-Borovsky, Eugene (1980) [1938]. The Middle Game in Chess. Dover. ISBN 0-486-23931-4.
