= Bakalchuk =

Bakalchuk is a surname. Notable people with the surname include:

- Johnatan Bakalchuk (born 1998), Israeli chess player
- Tatyana Bakalchuk (born 1975), Russian entrepreneur
