= Assem Afifi =

Egyptian chess player (born 1947)

Personal information
- Born: 3 January 1947 (age 79)

Chess career
- Country: Egypt
- Title: International Master (1985)
- Peak rating: 2405 (July 1985)

Assem Afifi (Arabic: عاصم عفيفي; born 3 January 1947) is an Egyptian chess International Master (1985).

== Chess career ==
From the early 1980s to the mid-1990s, Assem Afifi was one of Egypt's leading chess players.

Assem Afifi has participated two times in Interzonal Tournaments of the World Chess Championships:

- In 1985 in Tunis ranked 16th place;
- In 1990 in Manila shared 60th - 63rd place.

Assem Afifi played for Egypt in the Chess Olympiads:

- In 1980, at fourth board in the 24th Chess Olympiad in La Valletta (+6, =5, -3),
- In 1982, at first board in the 25th Chess Olympiad in Lucerne (+5, =3, -5),
- In 1984, at first board in the 26th Chess Olympiad in Thessaloniki (+6, =3, -2),
- In 1986, at first board in the 27th Chess Olympiad in Dubai (+6, =2, -3),
- In 1988, at first board in the 28th Chess Olympiad in Thessaloniki (+5, =4, -2),
- In 1990, at first board in the 29th Chess Olympiad in Novi Sad (+2, =5, -3),
- In 1992, at third board in the 30th Chess Olympiad in Manila (+2, =6, -2),

Assem Afifi played for Africa in the World Team Chess Championships:

- In 1985, at first board in the 1st World Team Chess Championship in Lucerne (+0, =2, -7),
- In 1989, at first board in the 2nd World Team Chess Championship in Lucerne (+0, =2, -2).

Assem Afifi played for Egypt in the African Team Chess Championship:

- In 1993, at second board in the 1st African Team Chess Championship in Cairo (+1, =3, -1) and won team silver medal.

Assem Afifi was awarded the Chess International Master (IM) title in 1985.
