= World Chess Championship 1993 =

Controversial chess matches

Professional Chess Association World Chess Championship 1993
	Defending champion	Challenger
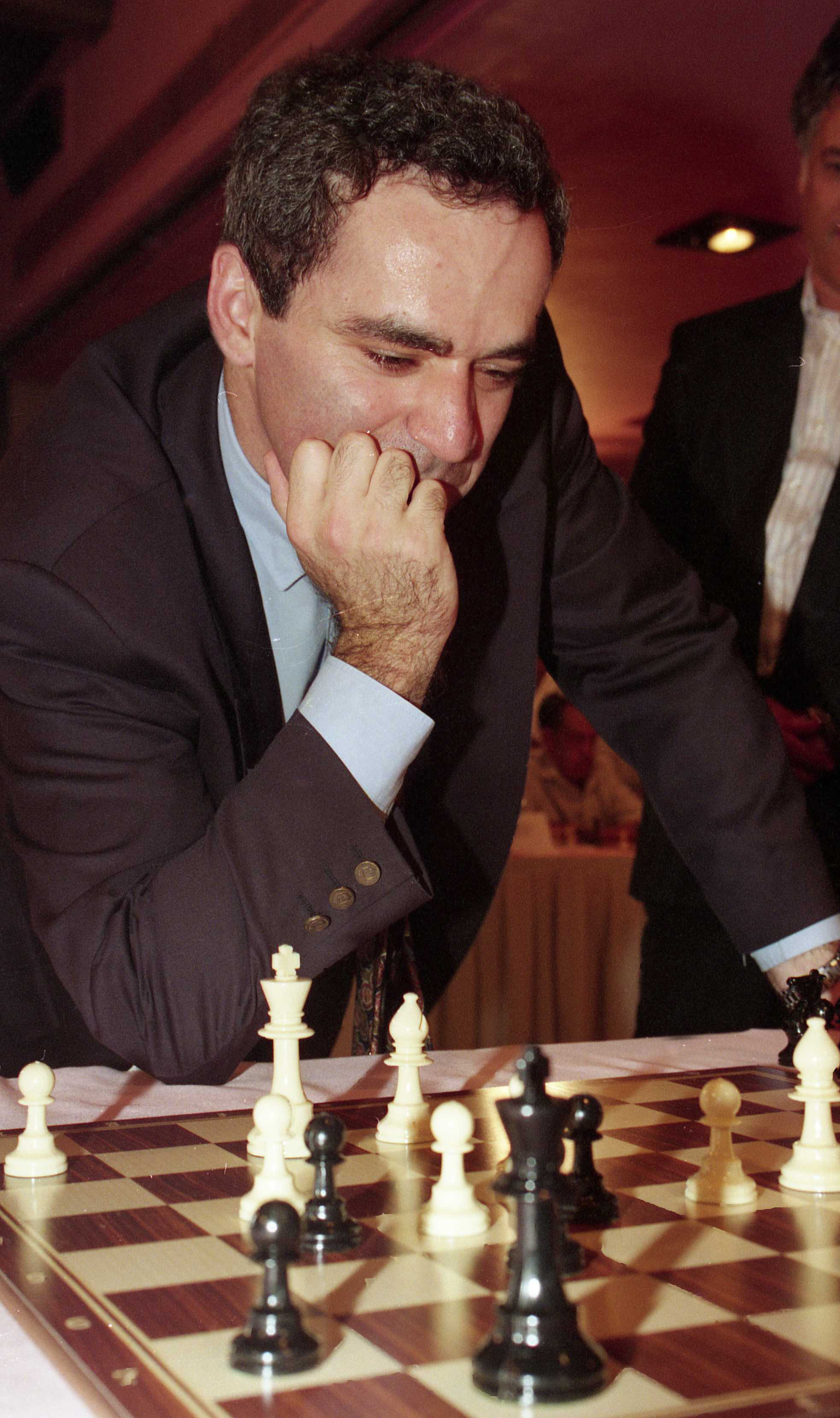
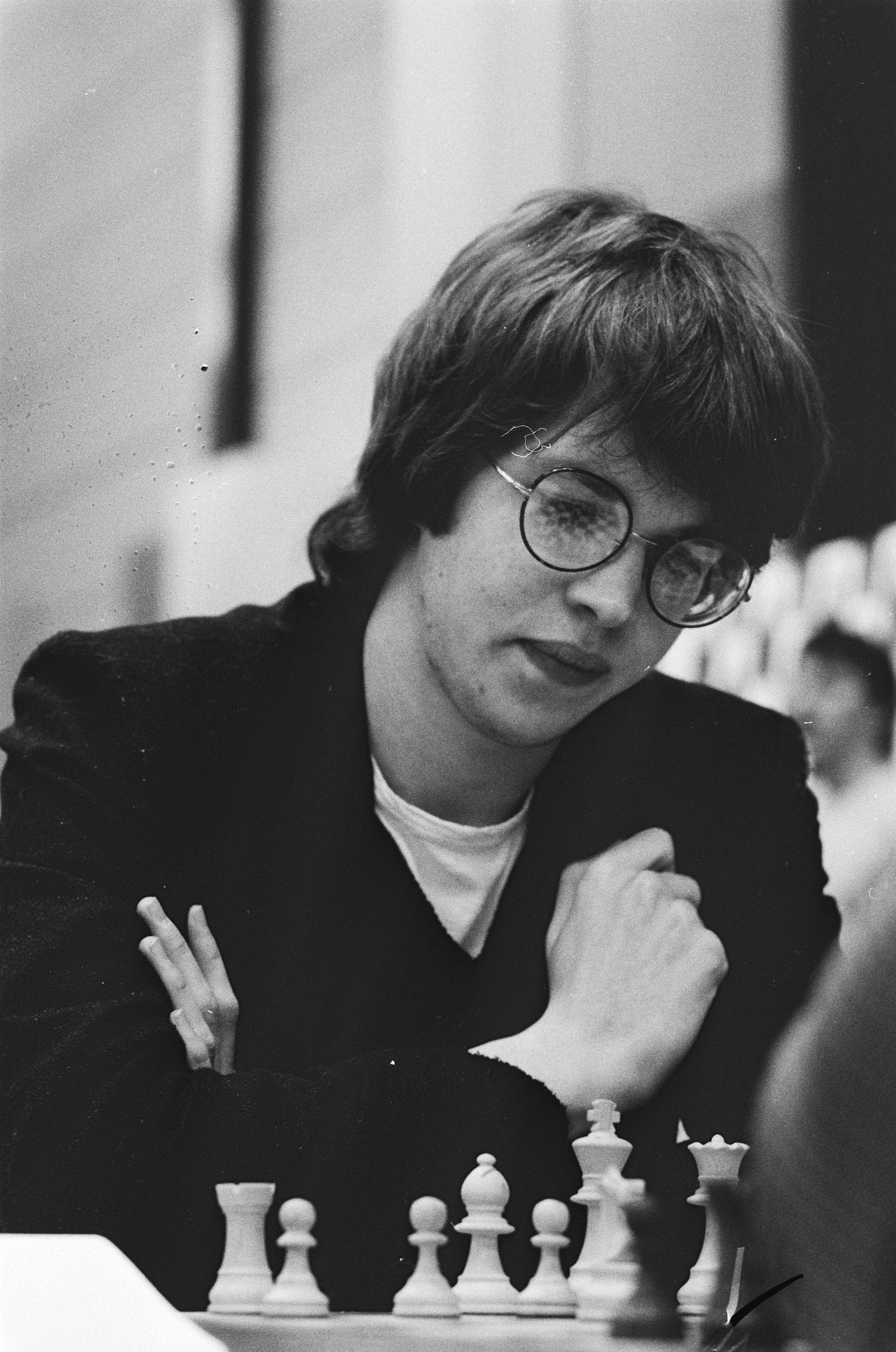
	Garry Kasparov	Nigel Short
	(Russia) Garry Kasparov	(United Kingdom) Nigel Short
12½	Scores	7½
	Born 13 April 1963; 30 years old	Born 1 June 1965; 28 years old
	Winner of the 1990 World Chess Championship	Winner of the 1993 Candidates Tournament
	Rating: 2815 (World No. 1)	Rating: 2685 (World No. 10)

FIDE World Chess Championship 1993
	Defending champion	Challenger
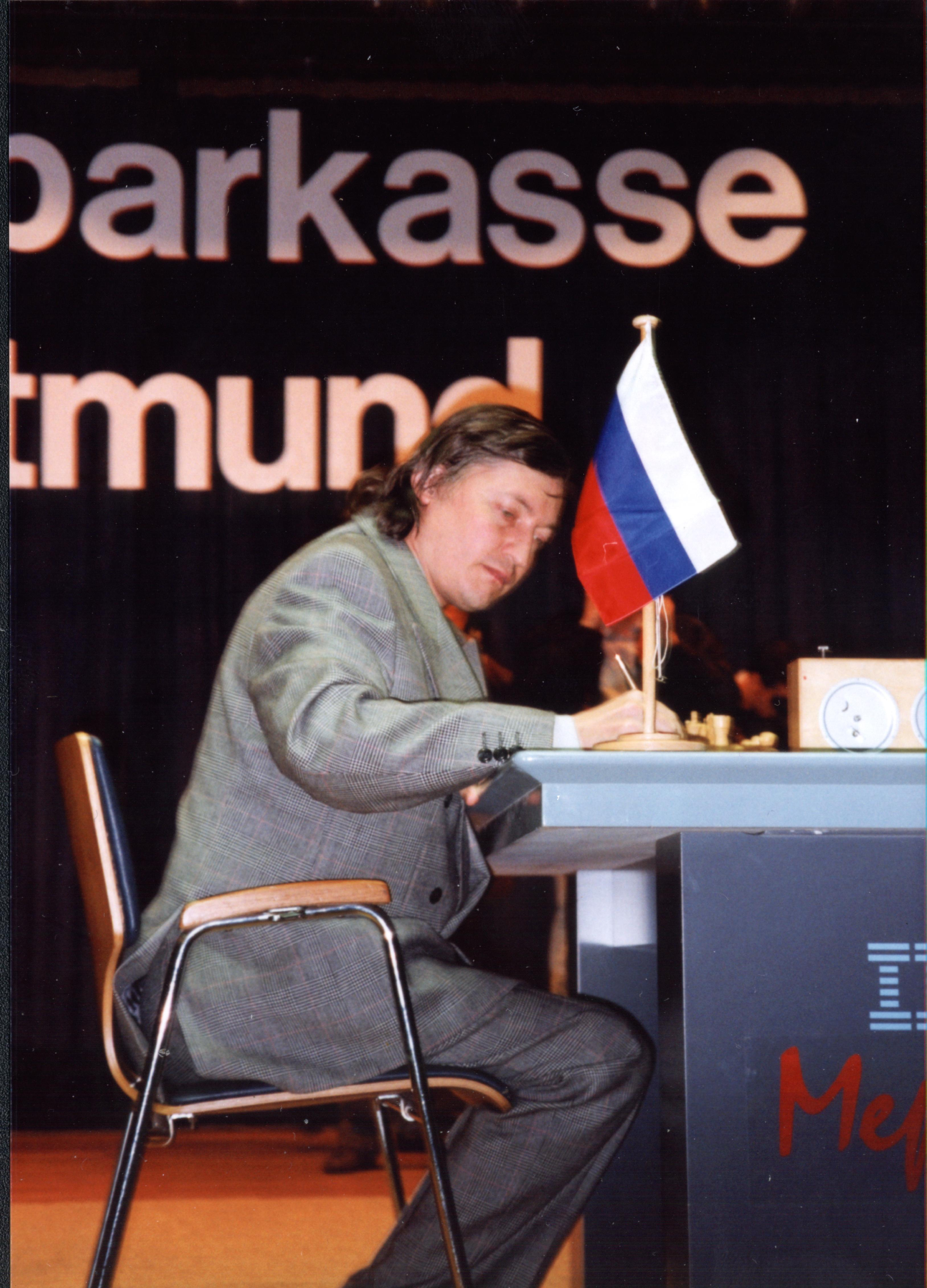
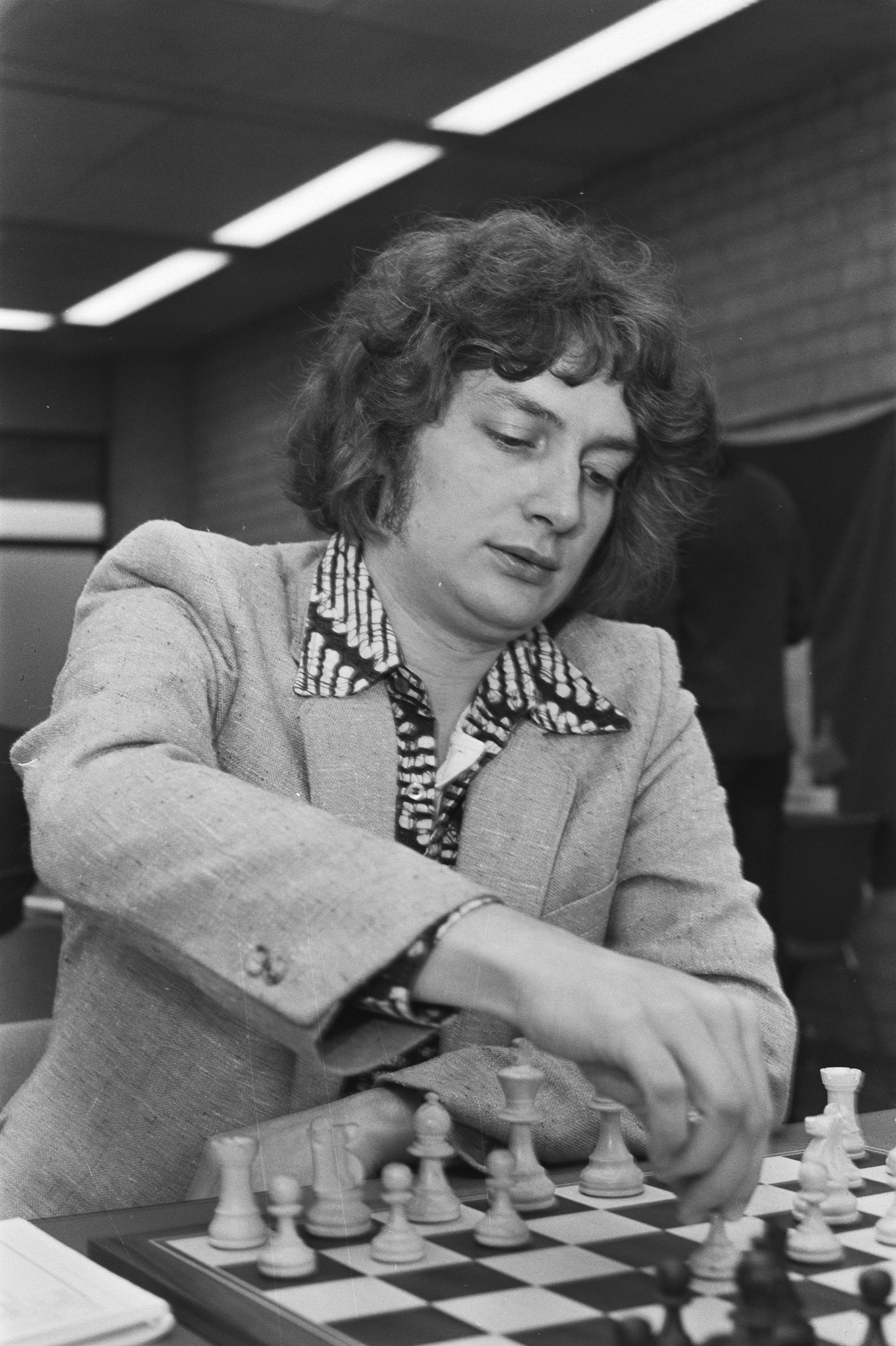
	Anatoly Karpov	Jan Timman
	(Russia) Anatoly Karpov	(Netherlands) Jan Timman
12½	Scores	8½
	Born 23 May 1951; 42 years old	Born 14 December 1951; 41 years old
	Runner-up of the 1990 World Chess Championship (replacement for (Russia) Garry Kasparov)	Runner-up of the 1993 Candidates Tournament (replacement for (United Kingdom) Nigel Short)
	Rating: 2760 (World No. 2)	Rating: 2620 (World No. 33)

The World Chess Championship 1993 was one of the most controversial matches in chess history, with incumbent World Chess Champion Garry Kasparov and official challenger Nigel Short splitting from FIDE, the official world governing body of chess, and playing their title match under the auspices of the Professional Chess Association. In response, FIDE stripped Kasparov of his title, and instead held a title match between Anatoly Karpov and Jan Timman.

The matches were won by Kasparov and Karpov respectively. For the first time in history, there were two rival World Chess Champions, a situation which persisted until the World Chess Championship 2006.

== 1990 Interzonal Tournament ==
For the first time, the Interzonal was held as a Swiss system tournament in Manila in June and July 1990. 64 contestants played 13 rounds; the top 11 qualified for the Candidates Tournament.

1990 Interzonal Tournament
		Rating	1	2	3	4	5	6	7	8	9	10	11	12	13	Total
1	GM Boris Gelfand (Soviet Union)	2680	=26	+42	+3	=14	+29	=5	=2	=11	+8	=12	=6	=9	+16	9
2	GM Vasyl Ivanchuk (Soviet Union)	2680	−54	+41	+43	+21	+8	+48	=1	=6	=12	=10	=5	+17	=3	9
3	GM Viswanathan Anand (India)	2610	=32	+44	−1	+49	−13	=54	+47	=18	=14	+29	+37	+12	=2	8½
4	GM Nigel Short (England)	2610	+20	−21	−13	=46	+33	+24	+7	−8	+30	+18	=11	=6	+12	8½
5	GM Gyula Sax (Hungary)	2600	=22	+64	+51	+8	=48	=1	=12	=9	=13	=11	=2	=10	=7	8
6	GM Viktor Korchnoi (Switzerland)	2630	=31	+33	=7	=15	+28	=30	+29	=2	=11	=13	=1	=4	=10	8
7	GM Robert Hübner (West Germany)	2585	=38	+62	=6	=16	=17	=18	−4	+19	+48	+21	=10	=11	=5	8
8	GM Predrag Nikolić (Yugoslavia)	2600	+13	+58	+12	−5	−2	=19	+40	+4	−1	=17	=21	=14	+25	8
9	GM Leonid Yudasin (Soviet Union)	2615	=45	+49	−29	+55	+25	=14	+48	=5	−21	+16	=12	=1	=11	8
10	GM Sergey Dolmatov (Soviet Union)	2615	=24	=23	+27	=11	+39	=29	+30	−12	+15	=2	=7	=5	=6	8
11	GM Alexey Dreev (Soviet Union)	2615	=44	=32	+22	=10	=21	+13	+14	=1	=6	=5	=4	=7	=9	8
12	GM Mikhail Gurevich (Soviet Union)	2640	+43	+36	−8	+37	=14	+34	=5	+10	=2	=1	=9	−3	−4	7½
13	GM Branko Damljanovic (Yugoslavia)	2515	−8	+53	+4	=51	+3	−11	+34	+16	=5	=6	−17	=19	=15	7½
14	GM Kiril Georgiev (Bulgaria)	2580	+57	=16	+17	=1	=12	=9	−11	=31	=3	=15	+28	=8	=20	7½
15	GM Ljubomir Ljubojević (Yugoslavia)	2600	+40	=29	=16	=6	=18	=17	=21	+22	−10	=14	+36	=25	=13	7½
16	GM Jaan Ehlvest (Soviet Union)	2655	+56	=14	=15	=7	=30	=23	+19	−13	+31	−9	+22	+21	−1	7½
17	GM Alexander Khalifman (Soviet Union)	2615	=33	+31	−14	+24	=7	=15	+23	=21	=29	=8	+13	−2	=19	7½
18	GM Yasser Seirawan (United States)	2635	=42	=26	=30	+56	=15	=7	=31	=3	+40	−4	=27	=24	+22	7½
19	GM Alexei Shirov (Soviet Union)	2580	=55	=35	=23	=33	+42	=8	−16	−7	+32	+50	+29	=13	=17	7½
20	GM Jóhann Hjartarson (Iceland)	2520	−4	+61	−37	−40	+38	−36	+45	=47	+54	=39	+42	+34	=14	7½
21	GM Nick de Firmian (United States)	2560	+61	+4	=48	−2	=11	+37	=15	=17	+9	−7	=8	−16	=28	7
22	GM Gad Rechlis (Israel)	2505	=5	=28	−11	+27	=47	=25	+46	−15	+41	+48	−16	+37	−18	7
23	IM Vasil Spasov (Bulgaria)	2495	=34	=10	=19	+36	=51	=16	−17	=44	−39	+43	=35	=26	+49	7
24	IM Igor Štohl (Czechoslovakia)	2525	=10	−34	+45	−17	+58	−4	+43	+39	=50	−37	+44	=18	=27	7
25	GM Michael Adams (England)	2590	+46	=63	+50	−29	−9	=22	=39	=49	+44	=27	+30	=15	−8	7
26	GM Roman Dzindzichashvili (United States)	2560	=1	=18	+38	−30	=31	=46	=63	=34	=36	=42	=39	=23	+41	7
27	GM Ľubomír Ftáčnik (Czechoslovakia)	2550	−51	+59	−10	−22	+64	=32	+57	=37	+34	=25	=18	=36	=24	7
28	GM Boris Gulko (United States)	2600	=64	=22	=32	+58	−6	=47	=41	=36	=33	+31	−14	+45	=21	7
29	GM Joël Lautier (France)	2570	+60	=15	+9	+25	−1	=10	−6	+50	=17	−3	−19	=39	=35	6½
30	GM Smbat Lputian (Soviet Union)	2575	+59	=51	=18	+26	=16	=6	−10	=48	−4	+33	−25	=41	=36	6½
31	GM Miguel Illescas (Spain)	2535	=6	−17	=64	+38	=26	+51	=18	=14	−16	−28	=32	+44	=37	6½
32	GM Božidar Ivanović (Yugoslavia)	2520	=3	=11	=28	−50	=36	=27	=53	=54	−19	+55	=31	=48	+56	6½
33	GM Eugenio Torre (Philippines)	2530	=17	−6	+62	=19	−4	=49	=42	+46	=28	−30	−45	+51	+48	6½
34	GM Simen Agdestein (Norway)	2600	=23	+24	+63	−48	+50	−12	−13	=26	−27	+52	+40	−20	=39	6½
35	IM Mihail Marin (Romania)	2485	=37	=19	=36	−39	=49	=42	−56	+55	+47	=40	=23	=50	=29	6½
36	GM Mikhail Tal (Soviet Union)	2580	+52	−12	=35	−23	=32	+20	=37	=28	=26	+56	−15	=27	=30	6½
37	GM Tony Miles (England)	2595	=35	=55	+20	−12	+43	−21	=36	=27	+49	+24	−3	−22	=31	6½
38	GM Jaime Sunye Neto (Brazil)	2465	=7	=39	−26	−31	−20	=60	=59	+58	=53	+47	=48	=42	+50	6½
39	GM Andrei Sokolov (Soviet Union)	2570	=62	=38	=54	+35	−10	=41	=25	−24	+23	=20	=26	=29	=34	6½
40	GM Petar Popović (Yugoslavia)	2520	−15	=60	=42	+20	+63	=50	−8	+56	−18	=35	−34	=49	=45	6
41	IM Goran Čabrilo (Yugoslavia)	2485	−48	−2	=59	+60	+56	=39	=28	=42	−22	+49	=50	=30	−26	6
42	GM Kevin Spraggett (Canada)	2540	=18	−1	=40	+64	−19	=35	=33	=41	+51	=26	−20	=38	=46	6
43	GM Alonso Zapata (Colombia)	2545	−12	+52	−2	+53	−37	=57	−24	−51	+61	−23	+58	=54	+55	6
44	GM Ye Rongguang (China)	2525	=11	−3	−49	+62	−55	+58	+51	=23	−25	+57	−24	−31	+54	6
45	GM Eric Lobron (West Germany)	2535	=9	−50	−24	=59	+52	−56	−20	=57	+60	+54	+33	−28	=40	6
46	IM Stuart Rachels (United States)	2475	−25	+47	=58	=4	=54	=26	−22	−33	−57	+62	=56	+52	=42	6
47	GM Margeir Petursson (Iceland)	2550	−63	−46	+57	+52	=22	=28	−3	=20	−35	−38	+60	=56	+59	6
48	GM Lajos Portisch (Hungary)	2590	+41	+54	=21	+34	=5	−2	−9	=30	−7	−22	=38	=32	−33	5½
49	GM Ian Rogers (Australia)	2535	=50	−9	+44	−3	=35	=33	+55	=25	−37	−41	+53	=40	−23	5½
50	GM Rafael Vaganian (Soviet Union)	2630	=49	+45	−25	+32	−34	=40	+54	−29	=24	−19	=41	=35	−38	5½
51	GM Gata Kamsky (United States)	2650	+27	=30	−5	=13	=23	−31	−44	+43	−42	=53	=52	−33	+60	5½
52	IM Lin Ta (China)	2435	−36	−43	+61	−47	−45	+64	+62	=53	=56	−34	=51	−46	+58	5½
53	GM Vasily Smyslov (Soviet Union)	2570	−58	−13	+60	−43	−57	+59	=32	=58	=38	=51	−49	=62	+61	5½
54	GM Murray Chandler (New Zealand)	2560	+2	−48	=39	=63	=46	=3	−50	=32	−20	−45	+61	=43	−44	5
55	IM Rico Mascariñas (Philippines)	2465	=19	=37	=56	−9	+44	−63	−49	−35	+59	−32	+62	=61	−43	5
56	IM Walter Arencibia (Cuba)	2555	−16	+57	=55	−18	−41	+45	+35	−40	=52	−36	=46	=47	−32	5
57	IM Herman Claudius van Riemsdijk (Brazil)	2440	−14	−56	−47	+61	+53	=43	−27	=45	+46	−44	=59	−60	=62	5
58	IM Fouad El Taher (Egypt)	2375	+53	−8	=46	−28	−24	−44	=60	−38	=62	=61	−43	+59	−52	4
59	IM Carlos Armando Juárez Flores (Guatemala)	2425	−30	−27	=41	=45	=62	−53	=38	=61	−55	+60	=57	−58	−47	4
60	IM Leon David Piasetski (Canada)	2410	−29	=40	−53	−41	=61	=38	=58	=62	−45	−59	−47	+57	−51	3½
61	IM Slaheddine Hmadi (Tunisia)	2335	−21	−20	−52	−57	=60	=62	+64	=59	−43	=58	−54	=55	−53	3½
62	IM Assem Afifi (Egypt)	2400	=39	−7	−33	−44	=59	=61	−52	=60	=58	−46	−55	=53	=57	3½
63	GM Valery Salov (Soviet Union)	2655	+47	=25	−34	=54	−40	+55	=26	-	-	-	-	-	-	3½
64	IM Praveen Thipsay (India)	2490	=28	−5	=31	−42	−27	−52	−61	-	-	-	-	-	-	1

Salov and Thipsay withdrew after seven rounds.

== 1991–93 Candidates Tournament ==
The final four players from the 1988–90 Candidates tournament—Karpov, Timman, Yusupov and Speelman—were seeded directly into the Candidates. They were joined by the top 11 finishers from the Interzonal. These 15 players played a series of Candidates matches. If matches were tied after the allotted games, extra pairs of rapid chess games were played until one player had the lead.

The preliminary matches were played in Sarajevo (Timman-Hübner and Gelfand-Nikolić), Wijk aan Zee (Korchnoi-Sax and Yusupov-Dolmatov), Riga (Ivanchuk-Yudasin), London (Short-Speelman), and Madras (Anand-Dreev) in January and February 1991. All four quarterfinals were played in Brussels in August 1991, both semifinals in Linares in April 1992, and the final in San Lorenzo del Escorial in January 1993.

Round of 16 (best of 8)
(Netherlands) Jan Timman	4½
(Germany) Robert Hübner	2½
(Switzerland) Victor Korchnoi	5½
(Hungary) Gyula Sax	4½
(Soviet Union) Artur Yusupov	6½
(Soviet Union) Sergey Dolmatov	5½
(Soviet Union) Vasyl Ivanchuk	4½
(Soviet Union) Leonid Yudasin	½
(England) Nigel Short	5½
(England) Jon Speelman	4½
(Soviet Union) Boris Gelfand	5½
(Socialist Federal Republic of Yugoslavia) Predrag Nikolić	4½
(India) Viswanathan Anand	4½
(Soviet Union) Alexei Dreev	1½
(no opponent)
(Soviet Union) Anatoly Karpov

Quarterfinals (best of 8)
(Netherlands) Jan Timman	4½
(Switzerland) Victor Korchnoi	2½
(Soviet Union) Artur Yusupov	5½
(Soviet Union) Vasyl Ivanchuk	4½
(England) Nigel Short	5
(Soviet Union) Boris Gelfand	3
(India) Viswanathan Anand	3½
(Soviet Union) Anatoly Karpov	4½

Semifinals (best of 10)
(Netherlands) Jan Timman	6
(Russia) Artur Yusupov	4
(England) Nigel Short	6
(Russia) Anatoly Karpov	4

Final (best of 14)
(Netherlands) Jan Timman	5½
(England) Nigel Short	7½

== 1993 PCA match ==
Before the match could take place, both Kasparov and Short complained of corruption and a lack of professionalism within FIDE and split from FIDE to set up the Professional Chess Association (PCA), under whose auspices they held their match. The event was orchestrated largely by Raymond Keene. Keene brought the event to London (FIDE had planned it for Manchester), and England was whipped up into something of a chess fever: Channel 4 broadcast some 81 programmes on the match, the BBC also had coverage, and Short appeared in television beer commercials. The Kasparov–Short final was best of 24 games, played in London in September and October 1993.

PCA World Chess Championship Match 1993
	Rating	1	2	3	4	5	6	7	8	9	10	11	12	13	14	15	16	17	18	19	20	Total
Garry Kasparov (Russia)	2815	1	½	1	1	½	½	1	½	1	½	½	½	½	½	1	0	½	½	½	½	12½
Nigel Short (Great Britain)	2665	0	½	0	0	½	½	0	½	0	½	½	½	½	½	0	1	½	½	½	½	7½

After the actual match, the players filled out the last four days of the playing schedule by playing a series of seven exhibition games (with openings chosen by the arbiter) that Kasparov won 5–2 (+4−1=2). There was also a game in which Kasparov and Short teamed up to play against the commentary team (which lost).

In the wake of the decisive victory by Kasparov, interest in chess in the UK soon died down.

== 1993 FIDE match ==
As a result of the unauthorized PCA match, FIDE stripped Kasparov of his title, removed him and Short from their rating lists, and arranged a match between Timman and Karpov, whom Short had beaten in the Candidates final and semifinal respectively. The FIDE match was played in Zwolle, Arnhem, Amsterdam, and Jakarta in September to November 1993.

FIDE World Chess Championship Match 1993
	Rating	1	2	3	4	5	6	7	8	9	10	11	12	13	14	15	16	17	18	19	20	21	Total
Jan Timman (Netherlands)	2620	0	1	½	½	½	0	½	½	½	0	½	½	½	0	0	0	½	½	½	1	½	8½
Anatoly Karpov (Russia)	2760	1	0	½	½	½	1	½	½	½	1	½	½	½	1	1	1	½	½	½	0	½	12½

Karpov won the best-of-24 match and thus regained the FIDE championship title that he had previously held from 1975 to 1985 before losing it to Kasparov.
