= Michal Lahav =

Israeli chess player (born 1999)

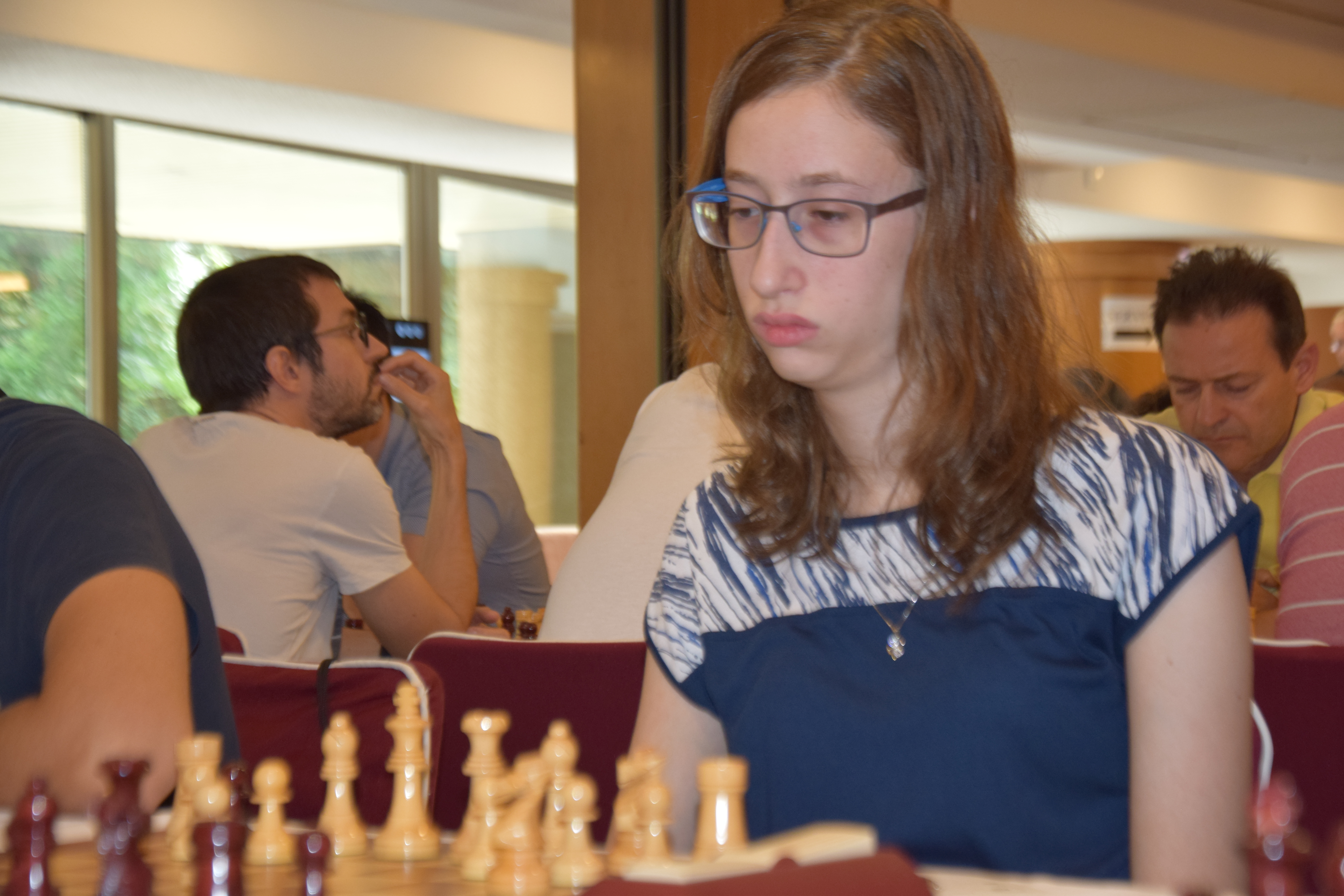
- Lahav at the 2017 Andorra open

Personal information
- Native name: מיכל להב
- Born: 3 October 1999 (age 26)

Chess career
- Country: Israel
- Title: Woman International Master (2019)
- Peak rating: 2286 (January 2020)

Michal Lahav (Hebrew: מיכל להב; born 3 October 1999) is an Israeli chess player who holds the FIDE title of Woman International Master (WIM, 2019). She was an Israeli Women's Chess Championship winner in 2016.

== Biography ==
In 2016, Lahav won Israeli Women's Chess Championship. In 2016, she ranked 3rd in World Youth Chess Championship in girl's U18 age group.

She played for Israel in the Women's Chess Olympiads:

- In 2016, at reserve board in the 42nd Chess Olympiad (women) in Baku (+2, =2, -0),
- In 2018, at reserve board in the 43rd Chess Olympiad (women) in Batumi (+1, =2, -2).

Lahav played for Israel in the European Women's Team Chess Championships:

- In 2017, at reserve board in the 21st European Team Chess Championship (women) in Crete (+0, =3, -1),
- In 2019, at fourth board in the 22nd European Team Chess Championship (women) in Batumi (+3, =3, -2).

In 2019, she won 2nd- 4th place in the Israeli Open Championships along with Gad Rechlis and Victor Mikhalevski with 7/9 points.

In 2019, she received the FIDE Woman International Master (WIM) title.
