= Gad Rechlis =

Israeli chess grandmaster (born 1967)

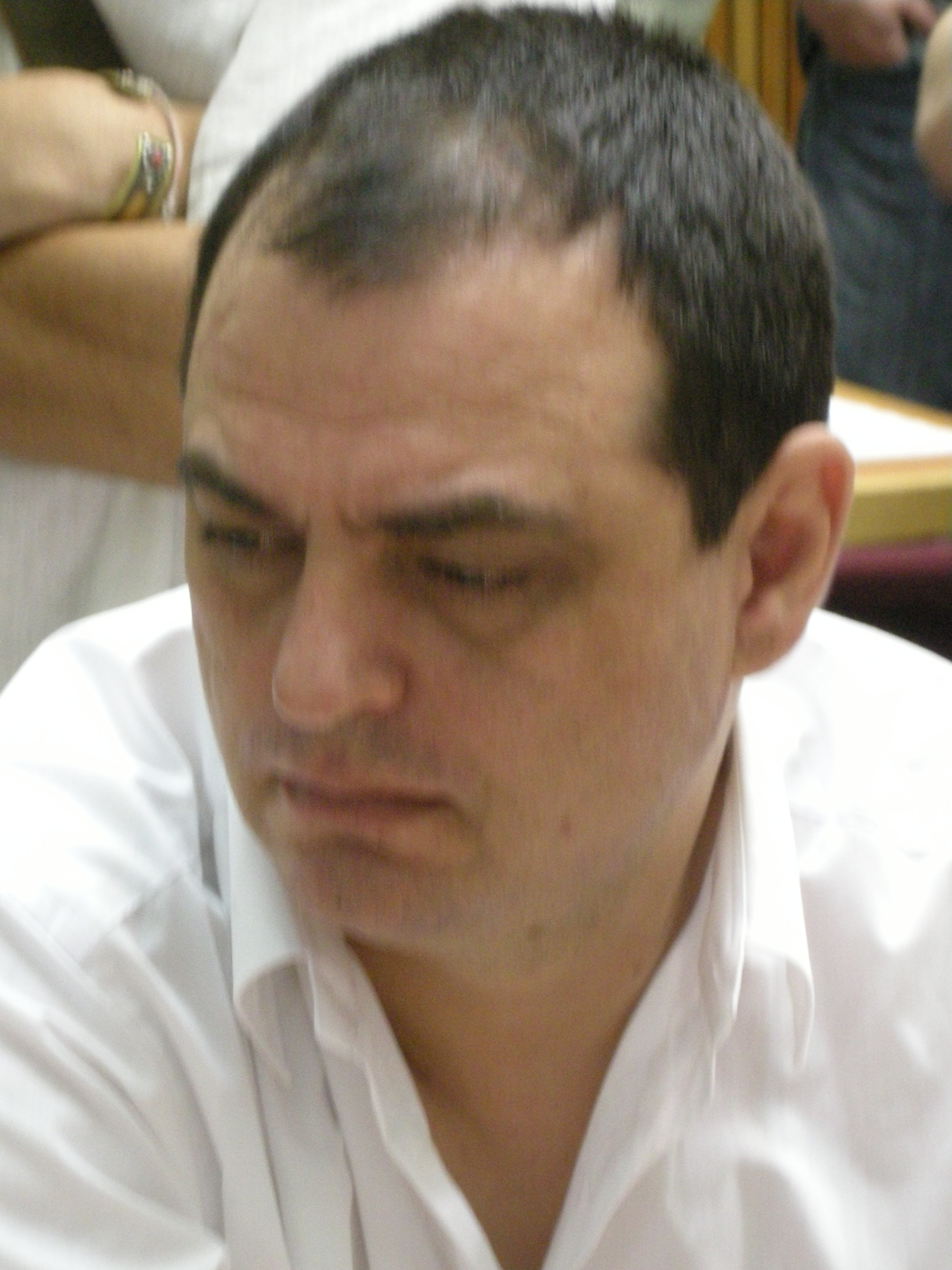
- Gad Rechlis in 2010

Personal information
- Native name: גד רכליס
- Born: 5 February 1967 (age 59) Chișinău, Moldova

Chess career
- Country: Israel
- Title: Grandmaster (1992)
- FIDE rating: 2448 (July 2026)
- Peak rating: 2535 (July 1996)

Gad Rechlis (Hebrew: גד רכליס; born 5 February 1967) is a Moldova born Israeli chess player who holds the title of Grandmaster (GM) (1992).

== Biography ==
At the turn of the 1980s and 1990s, Gad Rechlis was one of the leading Israeli chess players. In 1988, he won the Israeli Chess Championship. In 1990 in Manila he participated in the World Chess Championship Interzonal Tournament where ranked in 22nd place.

Gad Rechlis is winner of many international chess tournaments, including winning or sharing first place in Berlin (Berliner Sommer, 1987 and 1995), Bern (Zonal tournament, 1990), Ostrava (1991), Vienna (1996).

Gad Rechlis played for Israel in the Chess Olympiads:

- In 1988, at second board in the 28th Chess Olympiad in Thessaloniki (+7, =3, -3),
- In 1990, at third board in the 29th Chess Olympiad in Novi Sad (+1, =3, -3).

Gad Rechlis played for Israel in the European Team Chess Championship:

- In 1989, at fifth board in the 9th European Team Chess Championship in Haifa (+3, =3, -2).

In 2019, he won 2nd- 4th place in the Israeli Open Championships along with Michal Lahav and Victor Mikhalevski with 7/9 points.

First place in the 2019 Natan Blumkin Memorial tied with Tamir Nabaty and Johnatan Bakalchuk with a score of 8/10.

In 1986, he was awarded the FIDE International Master (IM) title and received the FIDE Grandmaster (GM) title four years later.
