= Slaheddine Hmadi =

Tunisian chess player (born 1950)

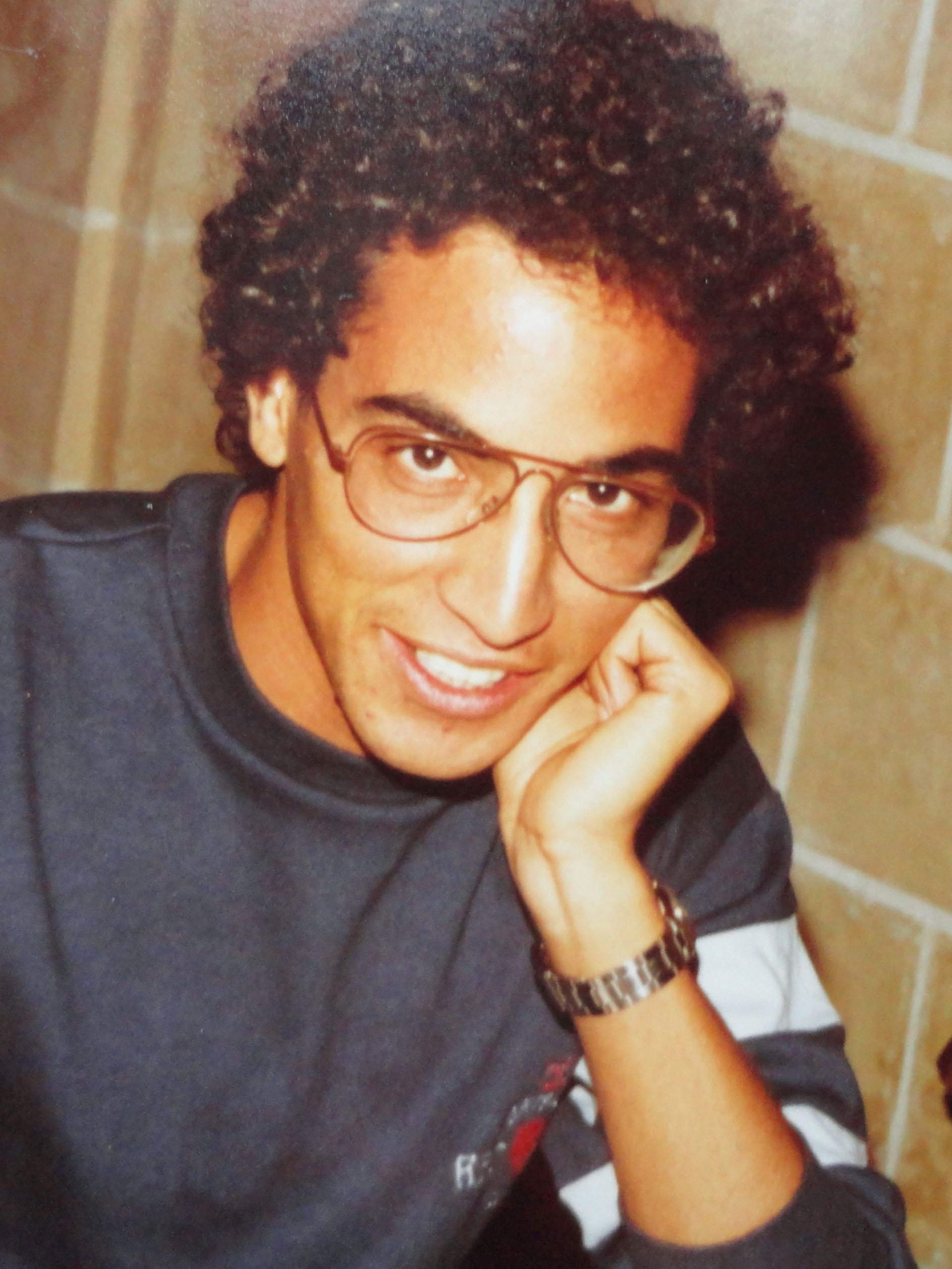

Personal information
- Native name: صلاح الدين حمادي
- Born: 1950 (age 75–76)

Chess career
- Country: Tunisia
- Title: International Master (1982)
- Peak rating: 2350 (January 1995)

Slaheddine Hmadi (Arabic: صلاح الدين حمادي; born 1950) is a Tunisian chess International Master (1982).

== Chess career ==
From the late 1970s to the late 1990s, Slaheddine Hmadi was one of the leading Tunisian chess players, second only to Slim Bouaziz.

Slaheddine Hmadi has participated two times in Interzonal Tournaments of the World Chess Championships:

- In 1985 in Tunis ranked 17th place;
- In 1990 in Manila shared 60th - 62nd place.

Slaheddine Hmadi represented the Tunisian team in major team chess tournaments:

- in Chess Olympiad participated 8 times (1978-1980, 1984–1986, 1990–1996);
- in World Team Chess Championship participated in 1985;
- in African Team Chess Championships participated 2 times (1993, 1997) and won individual gold (1993) medal.

Slaheddine Hmadi was awarded the Chess International Master (IM) title in 1982.
