= World Chess Championship 1987 =

Duel for the World Chess Championship

	Defending champion	Challenger
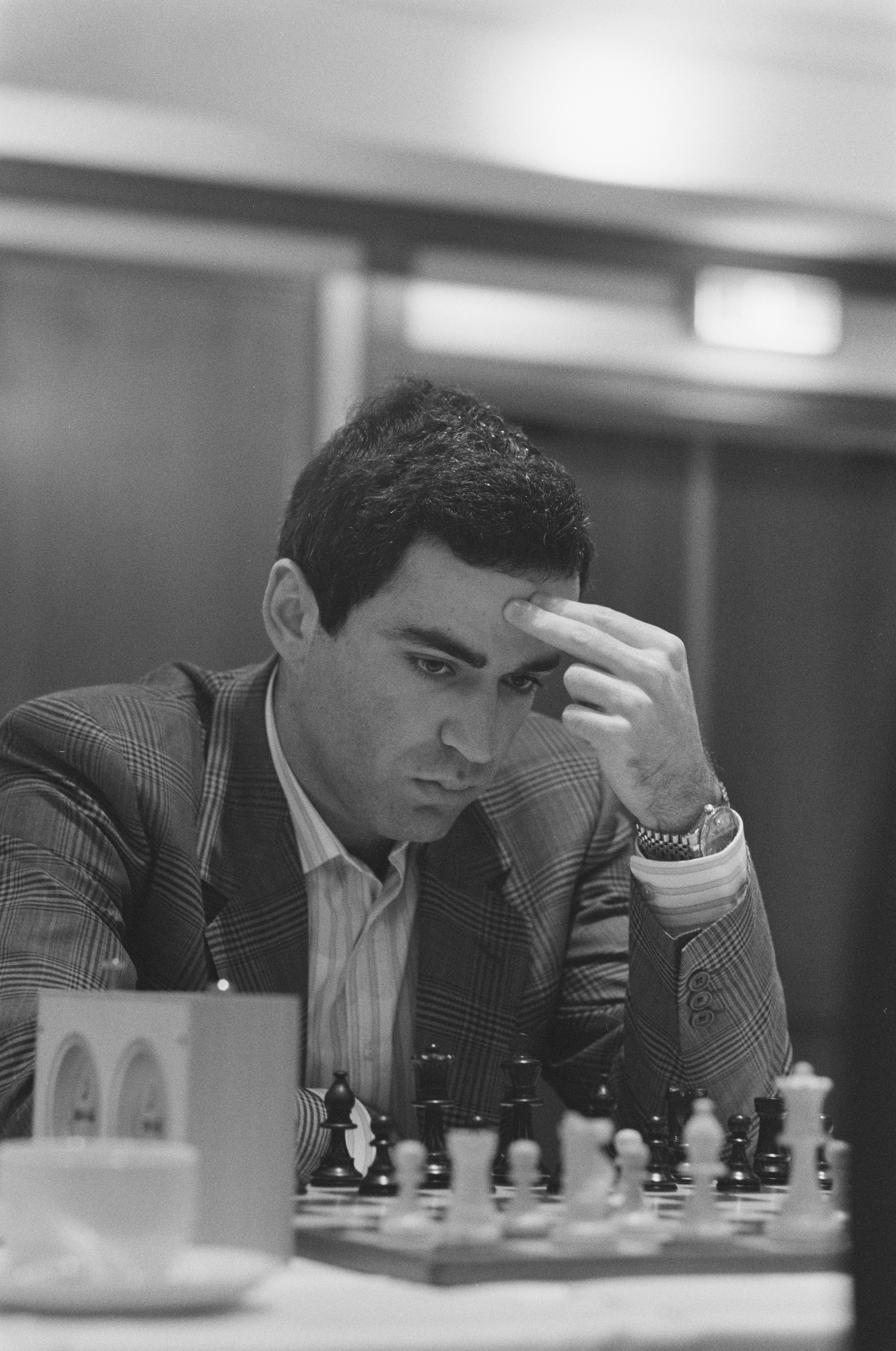
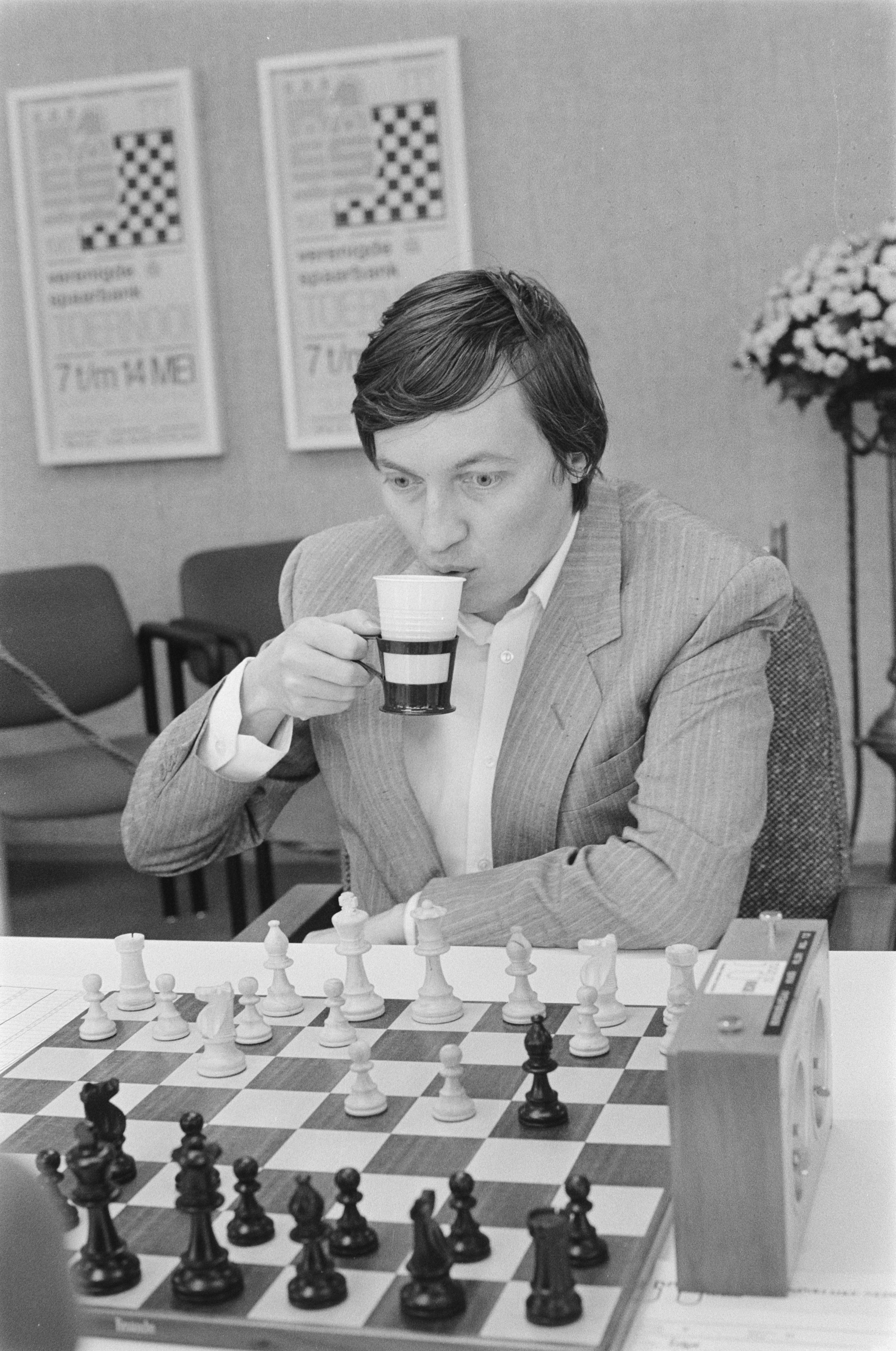
	Garry Kasparov	Anatoly Karpov
	(Soviet Union) Garry Kasparov	(Soviet Union) Anatoly Karpov
12	Scores	12
	Born 13 April 1963; 24 years old	Born 23 May 1951; 36 years old
	Winner of the 1986 World Chess Championship	Winner of the Candidates Tournament
	Rating: 2740 (World No. 1)	Rating: 2700 (World No. 2)

The 1987 World Chess Championship was played between Anatoly Karpov and Garry Kasparov in Seville from October 12 to December 19, 1987. Before the 24th game, Kasparov was down 12–11, but in the 24th game, Kasparov made a comeback by using the English Opening to win the final game to retain his title.

== 1985 Interzonal tournaments ==
Three Interzonal tournaments were held in 1985 in Tunis, Taxco, and Biel, with four players qualifying from each.

April–May 1985 Interzonal, Tunis
		Rating	1	2	3	4	5	6	7	8	9	10	11	12	13	14	15	16	17	Total	Tie break
1	Artur Yusupov (Soviet Union)	2590	-	½	1	1	½	½	1	½	½	½	½	1	1	½	1	½	1	11½	
2	Alexander Beliavsky (Soviet Union)	2635	½	-	½	½	1	½	½	1	1	½	½	1	0	½	1	1	1	11	
3	Lajos Portisch (Hungary)	2635	0	½	-	½	1	½	½	½	½	½	1	½	1	½	½	1	1	10½	
4	Viktor Gavrikov (Soviet Union)	2550	0	½	½	-	½	0	½	½	1	½	1	½	½	1	½	1	1	9½	66.75
5	Alexander Chernin (Soviet Union)	2495	½	0	0	½	-	½	½	1	0	½	½	1	½	1	1	1	1	9½	65.75
6	Vlastimil Hort (Czechoslovakia)	2560	½	½	½	1	½	-	½	½	0	½	½	½	½	1	0	1	1	9	66.25
7	Gennadi Sosonko (Netherlands)	2535	0	½	½	½	½	½	-	½	½	½	½	½	½	½	1	1	1	9	63.25
8	Maxim Dlugy (United States)	2485	½	0	½	½	0	½	½	-	½	½	1	½	½	1	½	1	1	9	62.75
9	Nick de Firmian (United States)	2540	½	0	½	0	1	1	½	½	-	1	0	½	½	1	0	½	1	8½	
10	Predrag Nikolić (Yugoslavia)	2575	½	½	½	½	½	½	½	½	0	-	1	0	½	0	½	1	1	8	58.75
11	Mihai Șubă (Romania)	2465	½	½	0	0	½	½	½	0	1	0	-	0	1	½	1	1	1	8	55.25
12	Tony Miles (England)	2570	0	0	½	½	0	½	½	½	½	1	1	-	½	0	½	1	1	8	55.00
13	Iván Morovic (Chile)	2450	0	1	0	½	½	½	½	½	½	½	0	½	-	½	1	½	½	7½	
14	Alonso Zapata (Colombia)	2535	½	½	½	0	0	0	½	0	0	1	½	1	½	-	½	½	½	6½	50.00
15	Evgenij Ermenkov (Bulgaria)	2515	0	0	½	½	0	1	0	½	1	½	0	½	0	½	-	½	1	6½	45.75
16	Assem Afifi (Egypt)	2370	½	0	0	0	0	0	0	0	½	0	0	0	½	½	½	-	1	3½	
17	Slaheddine Hmadi (Tunisia)	2285	0	0	0	0	0	0	0	0	0	0	0	0	½	½	0	0	-	1	

Yusupov, Beliavsky and Portisch qualified outright, while Chernin beat Gavrikov 3½-2½ in a Moscow playoff to take the fourth spot. Slim Bouaziz also started the tournament, but withdrew after six rounds, having drawn only one game and lost the rest. His results are not counted in the table above.

June 1985 Interzonal, Taxco
		Rating	1	2	3	4	5	6	7	8	9	10	11	12	13	14	15	16	Total	Tie break
1	Jan Timman (Netherlands)	2650	-	½	½	½	1	1	1	1	½	½	1	1	1	1	½	1*	12	
2	Jesús Nogueiras (Cuba)	2545	½	-	½	1	½	½	½	1	1	½	½	1	½	½	1	1*	10½	
3	Mikhail Tal (Soviet Union)	2565	½	½	-	½	½	½	½	½	½	1	½	½	1	1	1	1*	10	
4	Kevin Spraggett (Canada)	2560	½	0	½	-	1	½	½	1	½	½	½	½	½	1	1	½	9	
5	Jon Speelman (England)	2530	0	½	½	0	-	½	½	1	1	½	0	½	1	½	1	½	8	
6	Simen Agdestein (Norway)	2500	0	½	½	½	½	-	½	½	½	½	1	½	1	½	0	½	7½	54.00
7	Mišo Cebalo (Yugoslavia)	2485	0	½	½	½	½	½	-	0	0	1	1	½	0	½	1	1	7½	51.75
8	Lev Alburt (United States)	2535	0	0	½	0	0	½	1	-	½	½	½	½	½	1	1	½	7	
9	Walter Browne (United States)	2530	½	0	½	½	0	½	1	½	-	½	1	½	0	0	½	½	6½	48.25
10	József Pintér (Hungary)	2540	½	½	0	½	½	½	0	½	½	-	0	½	1	0	1	½	6½	47.75
11	Qi Jingxuan (China)	2440	0	½	½	½	1	0	0	½	0	1	-	1	0	0	½	1	6½	46.50
12	Oleg Romanishin (Soviet Union)	2570	0	0	½	½	½	½	½	½	½	½	0	-	½	1	1	0	6½	45.75
13	Marcel Sisniega Campbell (Mexico)	2470	0	½	0	½	0	0	1	½	1	0	1	½	-	½	0	1*	6½	44.50
14	Eduard Prandstetter (Czechoslovakia)	2430	0	½	0	0	½	½	½	0	1	1	1	0	½	-	0	½	6	
15	Saeed Ahmed Saeed (United Arab Emirates)	2400	½	0	0	0	0	1	0	0	½	0	½	0	1	1	-	1	5½	
16	Yuri Balashov (Soviet Union)	2495	0*	0*	0*	½	½	½	0	½	½	½	0	1	0*	½	0	-	4½	

Balashov withdrew after 11 rounds. His last four unplayed games are marked with an asterisk (*).

July 1985 Interzonal, Biel
		Rating	1	2	3	4	5	6	7	8	9	10	11	12	13	14	15	16	17	18	Total	Tie break
1	Rafael Vaganian (Soviet Union)	2625	-	½	½	1	1	½	½	½	½	½	½	½	1	1	1	1	1	1	12½	
2	Yasser Seirawan (United States)	2570	½	-	½	½	½	½	0	½	½	½	1	1	1	½	1	1	1	1	11½	
3	Andrei Sokolov (Soviet Union)	2555	½	½	-	½	0	½	½	½	½	½	1	½	1	½	1	1	1	1	11	
4	Nigel Short (England)	2575	0	½	½	-	1	1	0	½	½	1	½	½	1	1	½	½	½	1	10½	83.75
5	John van der Wiel (Netherlands)	2520	0	½	1	0	-	0	1	½	½	½	1	1	1	½	1	½	½	1	10½	81.25
6	Eugenio Torre (Philippines)	2535	½	½	½	0	1	-	½	0	½	½	0	1	1	1	1	½	1	1	10½	80.50
7	Lev Polugaevsky (Soviet Union)	2600	½	1	½	1	0	½	-	1	½	1	0	½	0	½	0	½	1	1	9½	79.00
8	Ljubomir Ljubojević (Yugoslavia)	2615	½	½	½	½	½	1	0	-	½	1	½	½	½	½	½	½	1	½	9½	78.25
9	Ulf Andersson (Sweden)	2590	½	½	½	½	½	½	½	½	-	½	½	½	½	½	1	½	1	½	9½	77.00
10	Amador Rodríguez Céspedes (Cuba)	2505	½	½	½	0	½	½	0	0	½	-	½	1	1	½	0	½	½	1	8	63.75
11	Gyula Sax (Hungary)	2535	½	0	0	½	0	1	1	½	½	½	-	0	0	1	0	½	1	1	8	62.50
12	Vlastimil Jansa (Czechoslovakia)	2480	½	0	½	½	0	0	½	½	½	0	1	-	1	½	0	0	1	1	7½	57.75
13	Miguel Quinteros (Argentina)	2525	0	0	0	0	0	0	1	½	½	0	1	0	-	1	1	1	1	½	7½	52.25
14	Margeir Petursson (Iceland)	2550	0	½	½	0	½	0	½	½	½	½	0	½	0	-	1	1	½	½	7	
15	Lev Gutman (Israel)	2485	0	0	0	½	0	0	1	½	0	1	1	1	0	0	-	1	½	0	6½	
16	Li Zunian (China)	2465	0	0	0	½	½	½	½	½	½	½	½	1	0	0	0	-	½	½	6	
17	Charles Partos (Switzerland)	2425	0	0	0	½	½	0	0	0	0	½	0	0	0	½	½	½	-	1	4	
18	Ángel Martín González (Spain)	2430	0	0	0	0	0	0	0	½	½	0	0	0	½	½	1	½	0	-	3½	

Short, van der Wiel, and Torre contested a playoff, also in Biel, for the fourth and final spot in the Candidates Tournament. Short and van der Wiel were tied with 3½ points each, while Torre scored 2 points, so Short qualified on a better tie break score from the main event.

The highest placed non-qualifying player from each Interzonal met in London in September 1985 to play for the position as first reserve in the Candidates Tournament. Speelman won with 4½ points, ahead of Gavrikov (4) and van der Wiel (3½). No reserve was needed, however.

== 1985–87 Candidates Tournament ==
The 12 qualifiers from the Interzonals were joined in the Candidates Tournament by three seeded players: Smyslov, Korchnoi, and Ribli (nos. 2–4 from the previous tournament). The final spot went to Spassky, who was given a wild card by the organizers.

These 16 players first played a round-robin in Montpellier in October and November 1985, from which the top 4 would qualify for the knock-out phase.

1985 Candidates Tournament
		Rating	1	2	3	4	5	6	7	8	9	10	11	12	13	14	15	16	Total	Tie break
1	Artur Yusupov (Soviet Union)	2600	-	0	1	½	½	1	½	½	½	½	½	½	½	1	1	½	9	65.75
2	Rafael Vaganian (Soviet Union)	2625	1	-	½	0	½	0	½	½	½	½	½	1	1	½	1	1	9	64.00
3	Andrei Sokolov (Soviet Union)	2555	0	½	-	½	½	0	½	1	½	½	½	1	1	1	½	1	9	63.25
4	Jan Timman (Netherlands)	2640	½	1	½	-	½	1	½	½	½	1	1	0	½	½	½	0	8½	65.25
5	Mikhail Tal (Soviet Union)	2565	½	½	½	½	-	½	½	½	1	0	½	½	1	1	½	½	8½	62.50
6	Boris Spassky (France)	2590	0	1	1	0	½	-	½	½	½	1	½	½	½	½	1	0	8	60.25
7	Alexander Beliavsky (Soviet Union)	2640	½	½	½	½	½	½	-	0	½	½	1	½	½	½	½	1	8	58.25
8	Vasily Smyslov (Soviet Union)	2595	½	½	0	½	½	½	1	-	½	½	½	½	½	½	0	1	7½	55.25
9	Alexander Chernin (Soviet Union)	2560	½	½	½	½	0	½	½	½	-	½	½	½	½	½	½	1	7½	54.50
10	Yasser Seirawan (United States)	2570	½	½	½	0	1	0	½	½	½	-	1	½	0	½	½	½	7	52.75
11	Nigel Short (England)	2575	½	½	½	0	½	½	0	½	½	0	-	1	½	1	½	½	7	51.50
12	Lajos Portisch (Hungary)	2625	½	0	0	1	½	½	½	½	½	½	0	-	1	0	½	1	7	50.75
13	Viktor Korchnoi (Switzerland)	2630	½	0	0	½	0	½	½	½	½	1	½	0	-	½	1	½	6½	46.50
14	Zoltán Ribli (Hungary)	2605	0	½	0	½	0	½	½	½	½	½	0	1	½	-	1	½	6½	46.50
15	Jesús Nogueiras (Cuba)	2545	0	0	½	½	½	0	½	1	½	½	½	½	0	0	-	1	6	
16	Kevin Spraggett (Canada)	2550	½	0	0	1	½	1	0	0	0	½	½	0	½	½	0	-	5	

A playoff match for fourth place was held after the main event. It ended 3–3, and Timman advanced because he had more wins during the tournament (4 against Tal's 3).

The top 4 from the round-robin played a series of matches in 1986, the winner of which (Sokolov) in turn got to play Anatoly Karpov in a final match in Linares to determine the championship challenger.

Quarterfinals
Minsk, Jan 1986
(Soviet Union) Rafael Vaganian	2
(Soviet Union) Andrei Sokolov	6
Tilburg, Jan-Feb 1986
(Soviet Union) Artur Yusupov	6
(Netherlands) Jan Timman	3

Semifinal
Riga, Sep-Oct 1986
(Soviet Union) Andrei Sokolov	7½
(Soviet Union) Artur Yusupov	6½

With Kasparov and Karpov playing the 1986 World Championship until October 1986, the loser (Karpov) was seeded directly into the Candidates final.

Challenger Match February–March 1987
	1	2	3	4	5	6	7	8	9	10	11	Total
Andrei Sokolov (Soviet Union)	½	0	½	½	½	0	½	½	½	0	0	3½
Anatoly Karpov (Soviet Union)	½	1	½	½	½	1	½	½	½	1	1	7½

Karpov won, thus earning the right to face Kasparov in a championship match for the fourth year in a row.

== 1987 Championship match ==
The best-of-24 match was tied after 22 games. On his 50th move of game 23 Kasparov played a sacrifice that he thought would draw the game and win the match, but Karpov found a refutation on move 53 and won the game a few moves later, leaving Kasparov needing to win the final game to retain his title. In a tense and dramatic 24th game, Karpov ran low on time and Kasparov seized a chance to sacrifice a pawn for an attack. In desperate time pressure Karpov missed the best defence and by the time the game was adjourned on move 42 Kasparov was a pawn up. Exploiting another mistake by Karpov in the second session of play, Kasparov slowly built his advantage until Karpov resigned on move 64. The match thus ended in a 12–12 tie, with Kasparov remaining World Champion.

World Chess Championship Match 1987
	Rating	1	2	3	4	5	6	7	8	9	10	11	12	13	14	15	16	17	18	19	20	21	22	23	24	Points
Garry Kasparov (Soviet Union)	2740	½	0	½	1	0	½	½	1	½	½	1	½	½	½	½	0	½	½	½	½	½	½	0	1	12
Anatoly Karpov (Soviet Union)	2700	½	1	½	0	1	½	½	0	½	½	0	½	½	½	½	1	½	½	½	½	½	½	1	0	12
