= Goran Čabrilo =

Serbian chess grandmaster (born 1958)

Personal information
- Born: 1 July 1958 (age 68)

Chess career
- Country: Yugoslavia → Serbia
- Title: Grandmaster (1995)
- Peak rating: 2530 (January 1993)

Goran Čabrilo (born 1 July 1958) is a Serbian chess player who holds the titles of Grandmaster (GM) (1995).

== Biography ==
Goran Čabrilo several times took part in the individual Yugoslav Chess Championship finals. His best result in these tournaments - twice 5th place (1989, 1990). In 1989, in Nea Makri Goran Čabrilo taking the leading place in the Zonal Tournament and was promoted to the Interzonal Tournament. In 1990 in Manila he participated in the World Chess Championship Interzonal Tournament where shared 40th - 47th place.

Goran Čabrilo is winner of many international chess tournaments, including winning or sharing first place in Trnava (1981), Subotica (1992), Vršac (2006), Belgrade (2008).

Goran Čabrilo played for Yugoslavia-3 team in the Chess Olympiads:

- In 1990, at second board in the 29th Chess Olympiad in Novi Sad (+4, =3, -3).

Goran Čabrilo played for Yugoslavia in the Men's Chess Balkaniad:

- In 1990, at fifth board in the 21st Chess Balkaniad in Kavala (+1, =4, -1) and won team gold and individual bronze medal.

In 1980, he was awarded the FIDE International Master (IM) title and in 1995 received the FIDE Grandmaster (GM) title.
