= Leon David Piasetski =

Canadian chess player

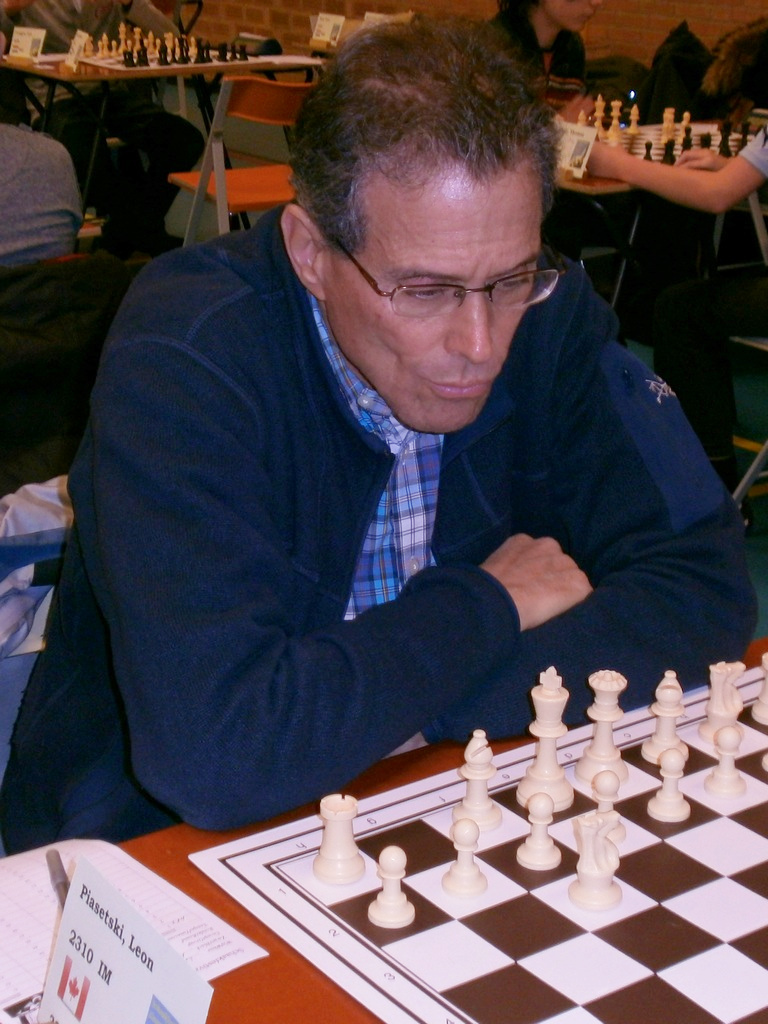
- Leon David Piasetski in 2012

Personal information
- Born: 24 December 1951 (age 74)

Chess career
- Country: Canada
- Title: International Master (1976)
- Peak rating: 2425 (January 1979)

Leon David Piasetski (born 24 December 1951) is a Canadian chess player who holds the titles of International Master (IM) (1976).

== Biography ==
For many years Leon David Piasetski was one of the top Canadian chess players. In 1970, he won the individual Canadian Junior Chess Championship. Piasetski was also a multiple finalist of the individual Canadian Chess Championship, winning, among others bronze medal in 1975.

Piasetski has participated in many international chess tournaments. In 1973 he took the third place in Netanya (tournament B). In 1977, Piasetski shared the 2nd place in Alicante. In 1984 he shared the 2nd place in Vancouver, while in 1989 in the tournament played in this city he won the first place. In 1989, Piasetski shared the 2nd place in the Canadian Zonal Tournament and was promoted to the Interzonal Tournament. In 1990 in Manila Piasetski participated in the World Chess Championship Interzonal Tournament where shared 60th - 63rd place.

Leon David Piasetski played for Canada in the Chess Olympiads:

- In 1974, at second reserve board in the 21st Chess Olympiad in Nice (+8, =2, -3),
- In 1976, at second reserve board in the 22nd Chess Olympiad in Haifa (+4, =0, -2),
- In 1978, at fourth board in the 23rd Chess Olympiad in Buenos Aires (+6, =2, -2),
- In 1988, at fourth board in the 28th Chess Olympiad in Thessaloniki (+5, =2, -3),
- In 1992, at second reserve board in the 30th Chess Olympiad in Manila (+1, =1, -4).
