= Johnatan Bakalchuk =

Israeli chess player (born 1998)

Personal information
- Native name: ג'ונתן בקלצ'וק
- Born: March 13, 1998 (age 28)

Chess career
- Country: Israel
- Title: International Master (2018)
- FIDE rating: 2422 (July 2026)
- Peak rating: 2471 (March 2019)

Johnatan Bakalchuk (Hebrew: ג'ונתן בקלצ'וק; born 1998) is an Israeli chess International Master since 2018 and a FIDE Master since 2014.

He won the Israeli Junior Championships in 2018.

He won first place in the 2019 Natan Blumkin Memorial tied with Gad Rechlis and Tamir Nabaty with a score of 8/10.

He won 2nd place in the Israeli U16 championship in 2013 and in 2014.

He won 1st place in the Israeli U11 championship in 2009.

He beat GM Mikhail Antipov in the fifth round of the European championship in 2015.
