= World Chess Championship 1937 =

	Defending champion	Challenger
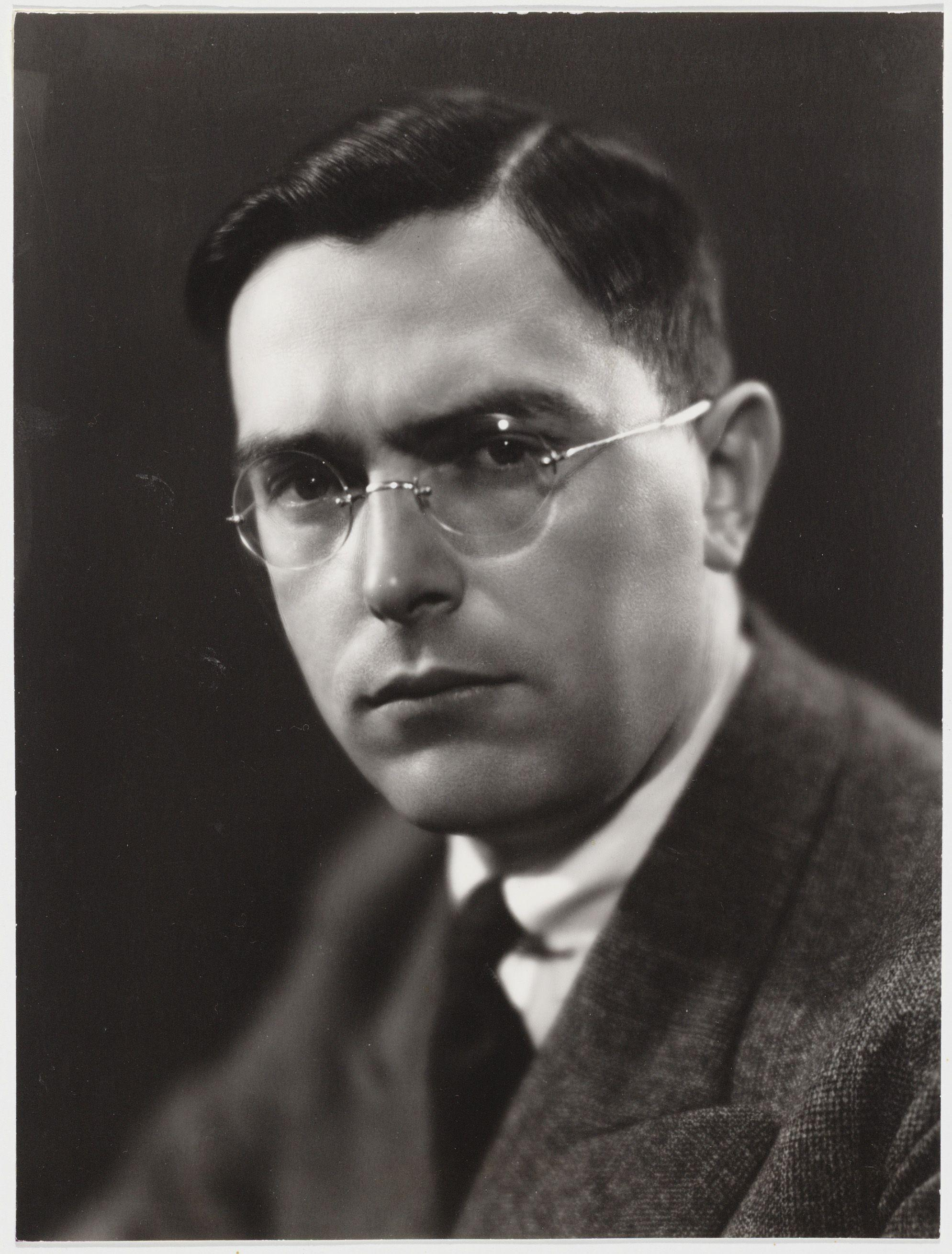
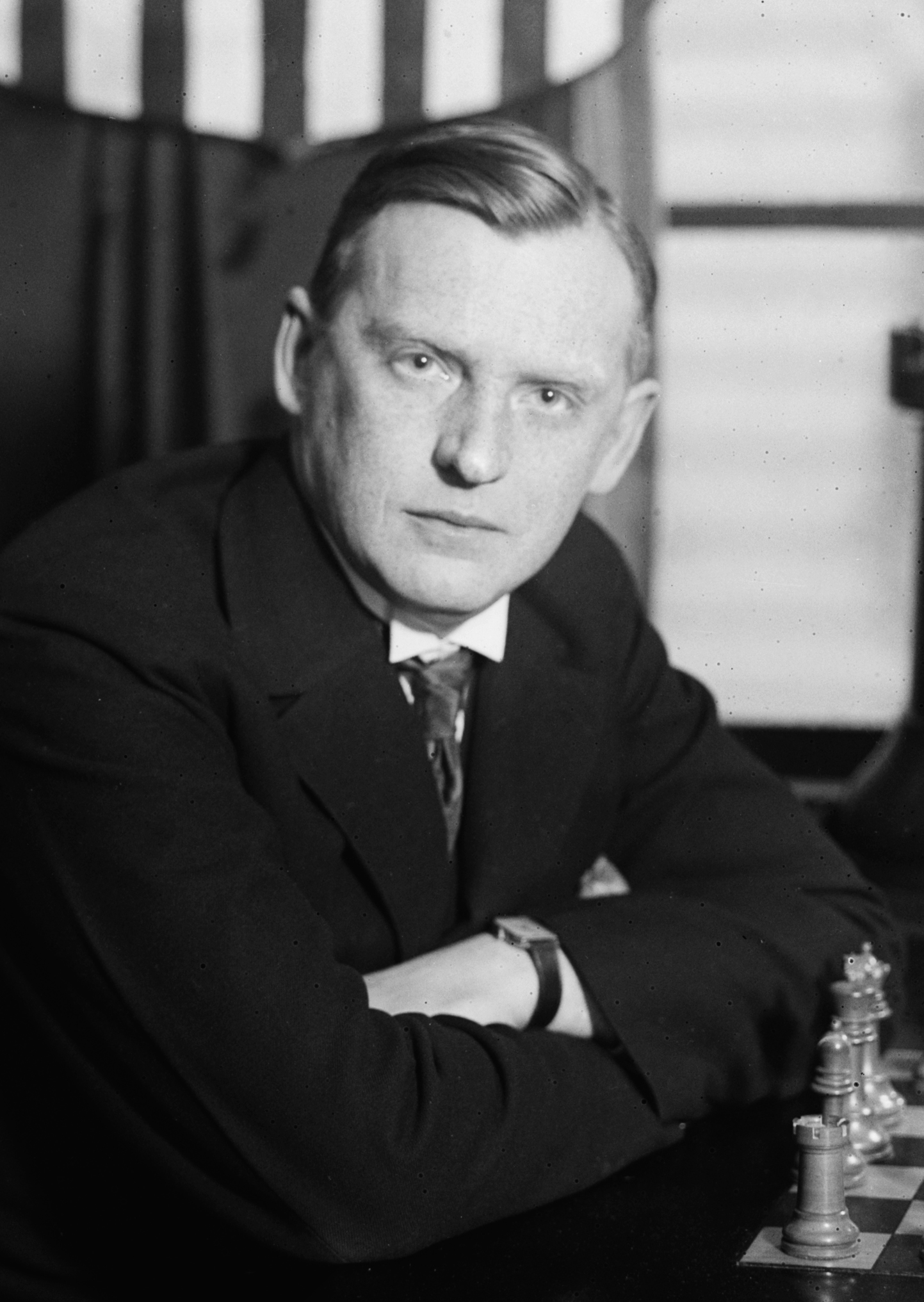
	Max Euwe	Alexander Alekhine
	(Netherlands) Max Euwe	(France) Alexander Alekhine
9½	Scores	15½
	Born 20 May 1901; 36 years old	Born 31 October 1892; 44 years old

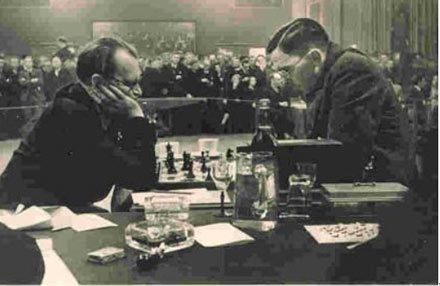
Alekhine facing Euwe in 1937

The 1937 World Chess Championship was played between Max Euwe and Alexander Alekhine in the Netherlands from October 5 to December 4, 1937. Alekhine regained his title in a rematch of the 1935 championship match.

== Factors ==
This was the last World Championship where the world champion had control of the title and could set match conditions; Alekhine died in 1946 and FIDE stepped in to take control of the World Championship. This was also the last World Championship to take place before the outbreak of World War II two years later; the tournament would resume in 1948.

== Results ==
The first player to win six games and score more than 15 points would be champion. Euwe led by 1 point after game 5 but Alekhine scored 4½ points from the next 5 games to take a virtually insurmountable lead. Over the next 10 games Euwe managed to reduce the deficit by 1 point before Alekhine again scored 4½ points from the next 5 games to win the title.

World Chess Championship Match 1937
	1	2	3	4	5	6	7	8	9	10	11	12	13	14	15	16	17	18	19	20	21	22	23	24	25	Wins	Points
Alexander Alekhine (France)	0	1	½	½	0	1	1	1	½	1	½	½	0	1	½	½	0	½	½	½	1	1	½	1	1	10	15½
Max Euwe (Netherlands)	1	0	½	½	1	0	0	0	½	0	½	½	1	0	½	½	1	½	½	½	0	0	½	0	0	4	9½

Alekhine won the Championship.
