= Max Euwe =

Dutch chess grandmaster (1901–1981)

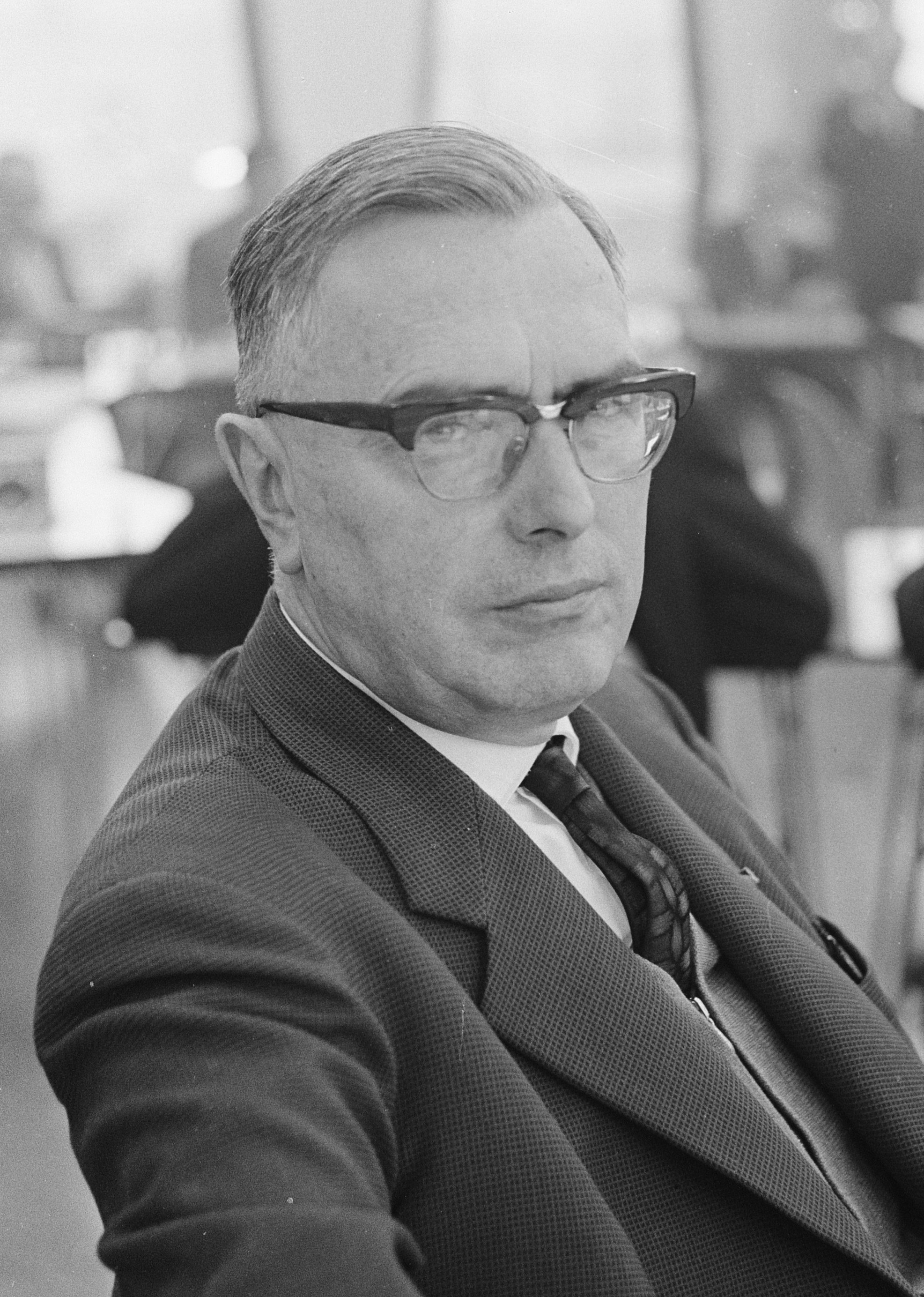
- Euwe in 1963

Personal information
- Born: Machgielis Euwe; May 20, 1901 Watergraafsmeer, Netherlands
- Died: November 26, 1981 (aged 80) Amsterdam, Netherlands

Chess career
- Country: Netherlands
- Title: Grandmaster (1950)
- World Champion: 1935–1937
- Peak rating: 2530 (May 1974)
- Peak ranking: No. 50 (May 1974)

President of FIDE
- In office 1970–1978
- Preceded by: Folke Rogard
- Succeeded by: Fridrik Olafsson

Machgielis "Max" Euwe (Dutch: [ˈøːʋə]; May 20, 1901 – November 26, 1981) was a Dutch chess player, mathematician, author, and chess administrator. He was the fifth player to become World Chess Champion, a title he held from 1935 until 1937. He served as President of FIDE, the World Chess Federation, from 1970 to 1978.

== Early years, education, and professional career ==
Euwe was born in Watergraafsmeer. He studied mathematics at the University of Amsterdam under the founder of intuitionistic logic, L.E.J. Brouwer (who later became his friend and for whom he held a funeral oration), and earned his doctorate in 1926 under Roland Weitzenböck. He taught mathematics, first in Rotterdam, and later at a girls' Lyceum in Amsterdam. After World War II, Euwe became interested in computer programming and was appointed professor in this subject at the universities of Rotterdam and Tilburg, retiring from Tilburg University in 1971. He published a mathematical analysis of the game of chess from an intuitionistic point of view, in which he showed, using the Thue–Morse sequence, that the then-official rules (in 1929) did not exclude the possibility of infinite games.

== Early chess career ==
Euwe played his first tournament at age 10, winning every game. He won every Dutch chess championship that he entered from 1921 until 1952, and won the title again in 1955; his 12 titles are still a record. The only other winners during this period were Salo Landau in 1936, when Euwe, then world champion, did not compete; and Jan Hein Donner in 1954. He became the world amateur chess champion in 1928, at The Hague, with a score of 12/15.

Euwe married in 1926, started a family soon afterwards, and could play competitive chess only during school vacations, so his opportunities for top-level international chess competition were limited. But he performed well in the few tournaments and matches for which he could find time, from the early 1920s to mid-1930s. He lost a training match to Alexander Alekhine in the Netherlands in December 1926 / January 1927, with 4½/10 (+2−3=5). The match was played to help Euwe prepare for a future encounter with José Raúl Capablanca, then world champion. Euwe lost both the first and second FIDE Championship matches to Efim Bogoljubow, held in the Netherlands in 1928 and 1928‒29 respectively, scoring 4½/10 in each match (+2−3=5 in the first match; +1−2=7 in the second match). He lost a match to Capablanca in Amsterdam in 1931 with 4/10 (+0−2=8). He won a match against Spielmann in Amsterdam in 1932, 3–1, played to help Euwe prepare for his upcoming match with Salo Flohr.

In 1932, Euwe drew a match with Flohr 8–8, and was equal second with Flohr, behind Alekhine, at a major tournament in Bern. According to Reuben Fine, these results established Euwe and Flohr as Alekhine's most credible challengers.

At Zürich 1934, Euwe again finished equal second with Flohr, behind Alekhine, and he defeated Alekhine in their game.

== World Champion ==
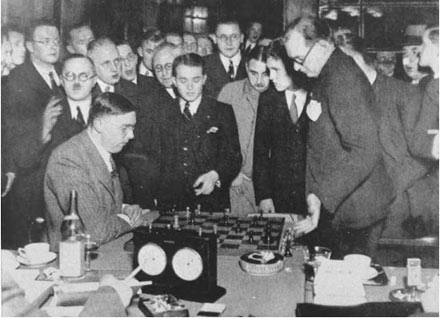
Euwe (seated), after one of the games from the 1935 Alekhine-Euwe match.

In 1933, Max Euwe challenged Alekhine to a championship match. Alekhine accepted the challenge for October 1935. Earlier that year, Dutch radio sports journalist Han Hollander asked Capablanca for his views on the forthcoming match. In the rare archival film footage where Capablanca and Euwe both speak, Capablanca replies: "Dr. Alekhine's game is 20% bluff. Dr. Euwe's game is clear and straightforward. Dr. Euwe's game—not so strong as Alekhine's in some respects—is more evenly balanced." Then Euwe gives his assessment in Dutch, explaining that his feelings alternated from optimism to pessimism, but in the previous ten years, their score had been evenly matched at 7–7.

On December 15, 1935, after 30 games played in 13 different cities around the Netherlands over a period of 80 days, Euwe defeated Alekhine by 15½–14½, becoming the fifth World Chess Champion. Alekhine quickly went three games ahead, but Euwe managed to even out and eventually win the match. His title gave a huge boost to chess in the Netherlands. It was also the first world championship where the players had seconds to help them with analysis during adjournments.

Euwe's win was regarded as a major upset – he reportedly had believed that beating Alekhine was unlikely – and is sometimes attributed to Alekhine's alcoholism. But Salo Flohr, who helped Euwe during the match, thought Alekhine's over-confidence was more of a problem than alcohol; Alekhine himself said he would win easily. Former world champions Vasily Smyslov, Boris Spassky, Anatoly Karpov, and Garry Kasparov later analysed the match and concluded that Euwe deserved to win and that the standard of play was worthy of a world championship. Former World Champion Vladimir Kramnik has said that Euwe won the 1935 match on merit and that the result was not affected by Alekhine's drinking before or during the match.

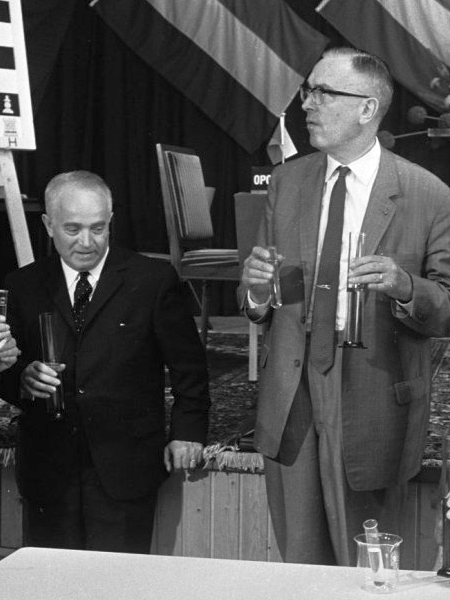
Flohr (left) and Euwe, 1969

Euwe's performance in the great tournament of Nottingham 1936 (equal third, half a point behind Botvinnik and Capablanca, half a point ahead of Alekhine) indicated he was a worthy champion, even if he was not as dominant as the earlier champions. Reuben Fine wrote, "In the two years before the return match, Euwe's strength increased. Although he never enjoyed the supremacy over his rivals that his predecessors had, he had no superiors in this period."

Euwe lost the title to Alekhine in a rematch in 1937, also played in the Netherlands, by the lopsided margin of 15½–9½. Alekhine had given up alcohol and tobacco to prepare for the rematch, although he resumed drinking later. He returned to the sort of form he had shown from 1927 to 1934, when he dominated chess. The match was a real contest initially, but Euwe's play collapsed near the end, and he lost four of the last five games. Fine, who was Euwe's second, attributed the collapse to nervous tension, possibly aggravated by Euwe's attempts to maintain a calm appearance.

The two world title matches against Alekhine represent the heart of Euwe's career. Altogether, they played 86 competitive games, and Alekhine had a +28−20=38 lead. Many of Alekhine's wins came early in their series; he was nine years older, and had more experience during that time. The rematch was also one-sided in Alekhine's favour.

Until American-born Bobby Fischer won the title in 1972, Euwe was the last World Chess Champion not born in the Russian Empire or Soviet Union.

== Later chess career ==
Euwe finished equal fourth with Alekhine and Reshevsky in the AVRO tournament of 1938 in the Netherlands, which featured the world's top eight players and was an attempt to decide who should challenge Alekhine for the world championship. Euwe also had a major organisational role in the event.

He played a match with Paul Keres in the Netherlands in 1939–40, losing 6½–7½.

After Alekhine's death in 1946, Euwe was considered by some to have a moral right to the position of world champion, based at least partially on his clear second-place finish in the great tournament at Groningen in 1946, behind Mikhail Botvinnik. But Euwe consented to participate in a five-player tournament to select the new champion, the World Chess Championship 1948. At 47, Euwe was significantly older than the other players, and well past his best. He finished last. In 1950, FIDE granted Euwe the title of international grandmaster on its inaugural list. He took part in the Gijón international tournament in 1951, winning ahead of Pilnik and Rossolimo with a score of +7=2.

Euwe's final major tournament was the double round robin Candidates' Tournament in Zürich, 1953, where he finished next to last. He was in the top half of the field after the first half of the tournament, but tired in the second half.

Euwe played for the Netherlands in seven Chess Olympiads from 1927 to 1962, a 35-year span, always on first board. He scored 10½/15 at London 1927, 9½/13 at Stockholm 1937 for a bronze medal, 8/12 at Dubrovnik 1950, 7½/13 at Amsterdam 1954, 8½/11 at Munich 1958 for a silver medal at age 57, 6½/16 at Leipzig 1960, and finally 4/7 at Varna 1962. His aggregate was 54½/87 for 62.6 percent.

In 1957, Euwe played a short match against 14-year-old future world champion Bobby Fischer, winning one game and drawing the other. His lifetime score against Fischer was one win, one loss, and one draw.

Euwe won a total of 102 first prizes in tournaments during his career, many of them local.

He became a computer science professor at Tilburg University in 1964.

== FIDE President ==
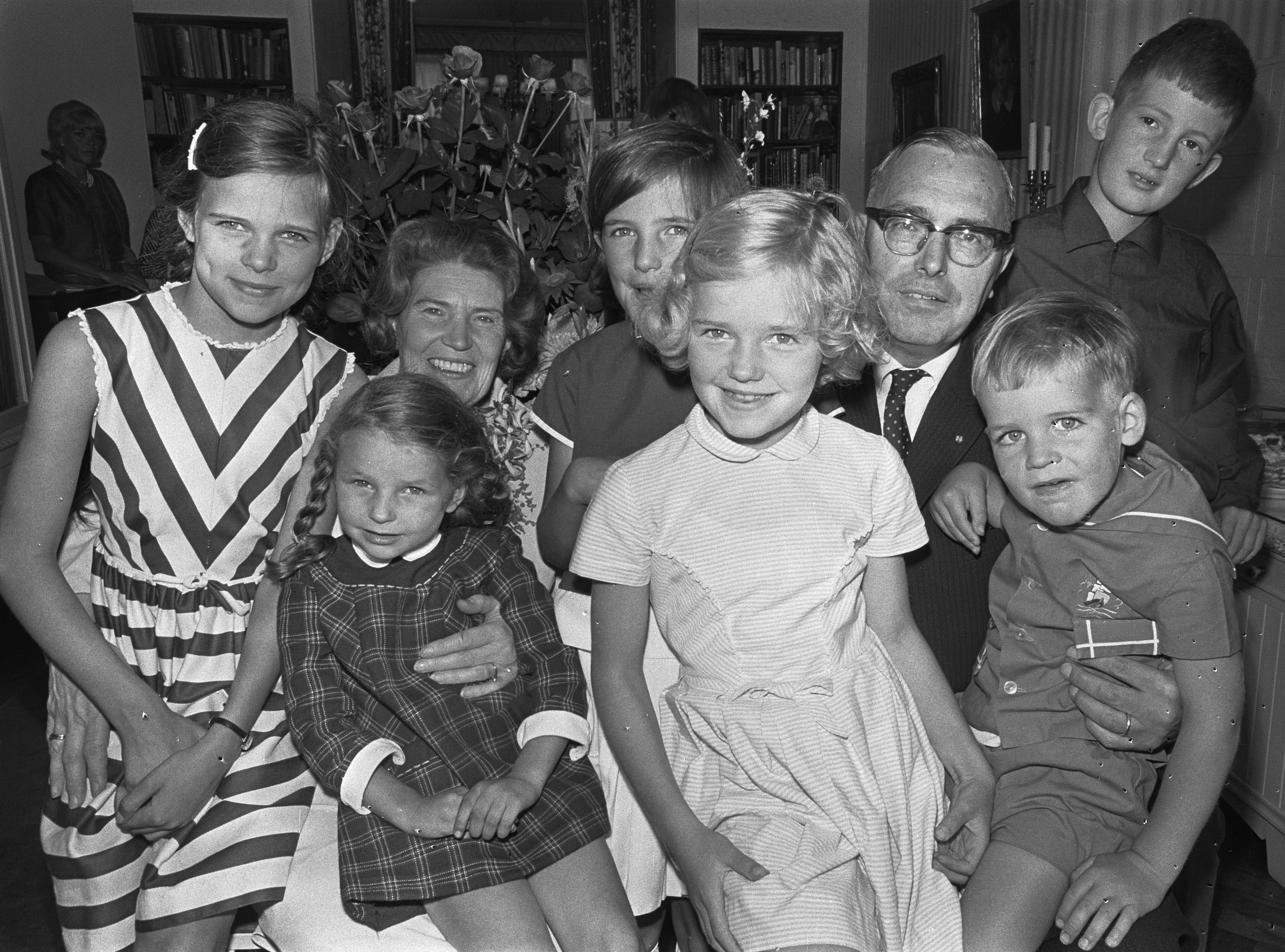
Euwe and wife celebrating the 40th anniversary of their marriage on 3 August 1966, surrounded by their grandchildren

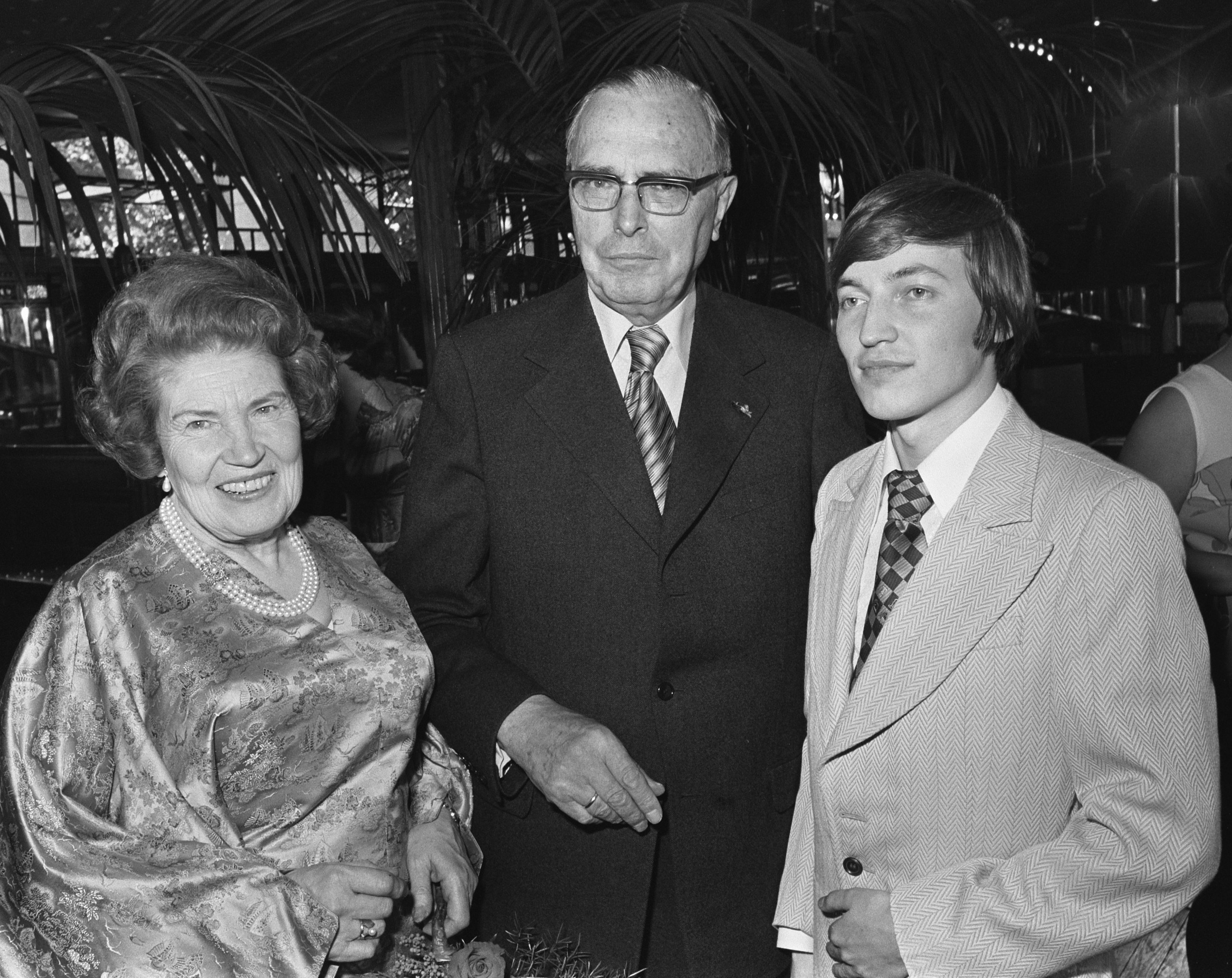
Euwe and wife meet Karpov in 1976

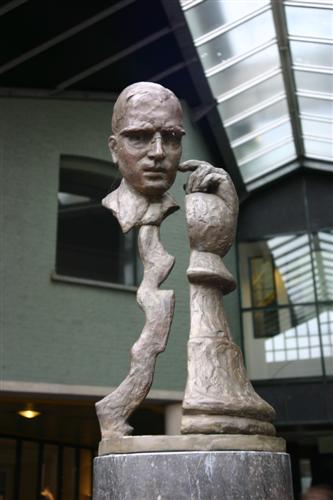
Sculpture of Euwe in Amsterdam by artist José Fijnaut

From 1970 (at age 69) until 1978, Euwe was president of FIDE. As president, he usually did what he considered morally right rather than what was politically expedient. On several occasions this brought him into conflict with the USSR Chess Federation, which thought it had the right to dominate matters because it contributed a very large share of FIDE's budget and Soviet players dominated the world rankings – in effect, they treated chess as an extension of the Cold War. These conflicts included:

- The events leading up to Bobby Fischer's participation in the World Chess Championship 1972 match against Boris Spassky, which led to Fischer's becoming the first non-Soviet champion since World War II. Euwe thought it important for the game's health and reputation that Fischer have the opportunity to challenge for the title as soon as possible, and interpreted the rules very flexibly to enable Fischer to play in the 1970 Interzonal Tournament, which he won by a commanding score.
- The defection of Gennadi Sosonko in 1972. The Soviets demanded that Sosonko should be treated as an "unperson", excluded from competitive chess, television or any other event that might be evidence of his defection. When Euwe refused, Soviet players boycotted the 1974 Wijk aan Zee tournament in the Netherlands because Sosonko competed.
- In 1976, world championship contender Viktor Korchnoi sought political asylum in the Netherlands. In a discussion a few days earlier, Euwe told Korchnoi: "... of course you will retain all your rights ..." and opposed Soviet efforts to prevent Korchnoi from challenging Anatoly Karpov's title in 1978.
- Later in 1976, Euwe supported FIDE's decision to hold the 1976 Chess Olympiad in Israel, which the Soviet Union did not recognize as a country, although the Soviets had won the 1964 Olympiad which had also been held in Israel. The Central Committee of Communist Party of the Soviet Union then started plotting to depose Euwe as president of FIDE.

Euwe lost some of his battles with the Soviets. According to Sosonko, in 1973, he accepted the Soviets' demand that Bent Larsen and Robert Hübner, the two strongest non-Soviet contenders (Fischer was now champion), should play in the Leningrad Interzonal tournament rather than the weaker one in Petrópolis. Larsen and Hübner were eliminated from the competition for the World Championship because Korchnoi and Karpov took the first two places at Leningrad.

Some commentators have also questioned whether Euwe did as much as he could have to prevent Fischer from forfeiting his world title in 1975.

It is also notable that in 1977, when Rohini Khadilkar became the first female player to compete in the Indian Chess Championship, some players objected to her being in the tournament because she was female; her father wrote to Euwe, and Euwe ruled that female players could not be barred from open chess events.

Despite the turbulence of the period, most assessments of Euwe's performance as president of FIDE are sympathetic:

- Spassky, who had nominated Euwe for the job: "He should certainly not have disqualified Fischer, and he should have been a little tougher with the Soviets ... you get a pile of complicated problems. But Euwe, of course, was the man for the job."
- Karpov said Euwe was a very good FIDE President, although he did commit one very serious error, rapidly extending the membership of FIDE to many small third-world countries. "But neither he nor I could have foreseen what this would lead to. ... This led not only to the inflation of the grandmaster title, but also to the leadership vacuum at the head of the world of chess."
- Garry Kasparov was blunter: "... unfortunately, he could not foresee the dangers flowing from a FIDE practically under Soviet dominance."
- Korchnoi regarded Euwe as the last honorable president of FIDE.
- Yuri Averbakh, who was a Soviet chess official as well as a grandmaster: "... he always sought to understand the opposing point of view ... Such behavior was in sharp contrast to the behavior of the Soviet delegation leaders ... Max Euwe was, without a doubt, the best President FIDE ever had."

Euwe died in 1981, age 80, of a heart attack. Revered around the chess world for his many contributions, he had travelled extensively while FIDE President, bringing many new members into the organisation.

== Assessment of Euwe's chess ==
Euwe was noted for his logical approach and for his knowledge of openings, in which he made major contributions to chess theory. Paradoxically, his two title matches with Alekhine were displays of tactical ferocity from both sides. But the comments by Kmoch and Alekhine (below) may explain this: Euwe "strode confidently into some extraordinarily complex variations" if he thought logic was on his side; and he was extremely good at calculating these variations. On the other hand, he "often lacked the stamina to pull himself out of bad positions".

Alekhine was allegedly more frank in his Russian-language articles than in those he wrote in English, French, or German. In his Russian articles he often described Euwe as lacking in originality and in the mental toughness required of a world champion. Sosonko thought Euwe's modesty was a handicap in top-class chess (although Euwe was well aware of how much stronger he was than "ordinary" grandmasters).

Vladimir Kramnik also says Euwe anticipated Botvinnik's emphasis on technical preparation, and Euwe was usually in good shape physically because he was a keen sportsman.

== Chess books by Euwe ==
Euwe wrote over 70 chess books, far more than any other world champion; some of the best-known are The Road to Chess Mastery, Judgement and Planning in Chess, The Logical Approach to Chess, and Strategy and Tactics in Chess. Former Soviet grandmaster Sosonko used Euwe and den Hertog's 1927 Practische Schaaklessen as a textbook when teaching in the Leningrad House of Pioneers, and considers it "one of the best chess books ever". Fischer World Champion, an account of the 1972 World Chess Championship match, co-authored by Euwe with Jan Timman, was written in 1972 but not published in English until 2002. Euwe's book From My Games, 1920–1937 was originally published in 1939 by Harcourt, Brace and Company, and was republished by Dover in 1975 (ISBN 0-486-23111-9). He also did not forget children in his published writings. The year he won the World Chess Championship he wrote a book named in Dutch: Oom Jan leert zijn neefje schaken, lit. 'Uncle Jan teaches his nephew to play chess' (EAN 9789043900669).

=== Bibliography ===
- Strategy and Tactics in Chess. 1937. McKay.
- My Best Games 1920–1937 My Rise to become World Champion. 2003 [1939]. Hardinge Simpole.
- Meet The Masters: Pen Portraits to the Greats by a World Champion. 2004 [1940]. Hardinge Simpole.
- The Hague/Moscow 1948 Match/Tournament for the World Chess Championship. 2013 [1948]. Russell Enterprises.
- Judgement and Planning in Chess. 1998 [1954]. Batsford.
- The Logical Approach to Chess. 1982 [1958]. Dover.
- Chess Master vs. Chess Amateur. with Walter Meiden. 1994 [1963]. Dover.
- The Middlegame Book One Static Features. with H. Kramer. 1994 [1964]. Hays Pub.
- The Middlegame Book Two Dynamic & Subjective Features. with H. Kramer. 1994 [1964]. Hays Pub.
- The Road to Chess Mastery. with Walter Meiden. 1966. David McKay.
- The Development of Chess Style. with John Nunn. 1997 [1968]. International Chess Enterprises.
- Fischer World Champion. with Jan Timman. 2009 [1972]. New In Chess.
- Euwe vs. Alekhine Match 1935. 1973. Chess Digest.
- A Guide to Chess Endings. with David Hooper. 1976. Dover.
- Bobby Fischer The Greatest? 1979 [1976]. Sterling.
- Chess Master vs. Chess Master with Walter Meiden. 1977. McKay.

== Legacy ==
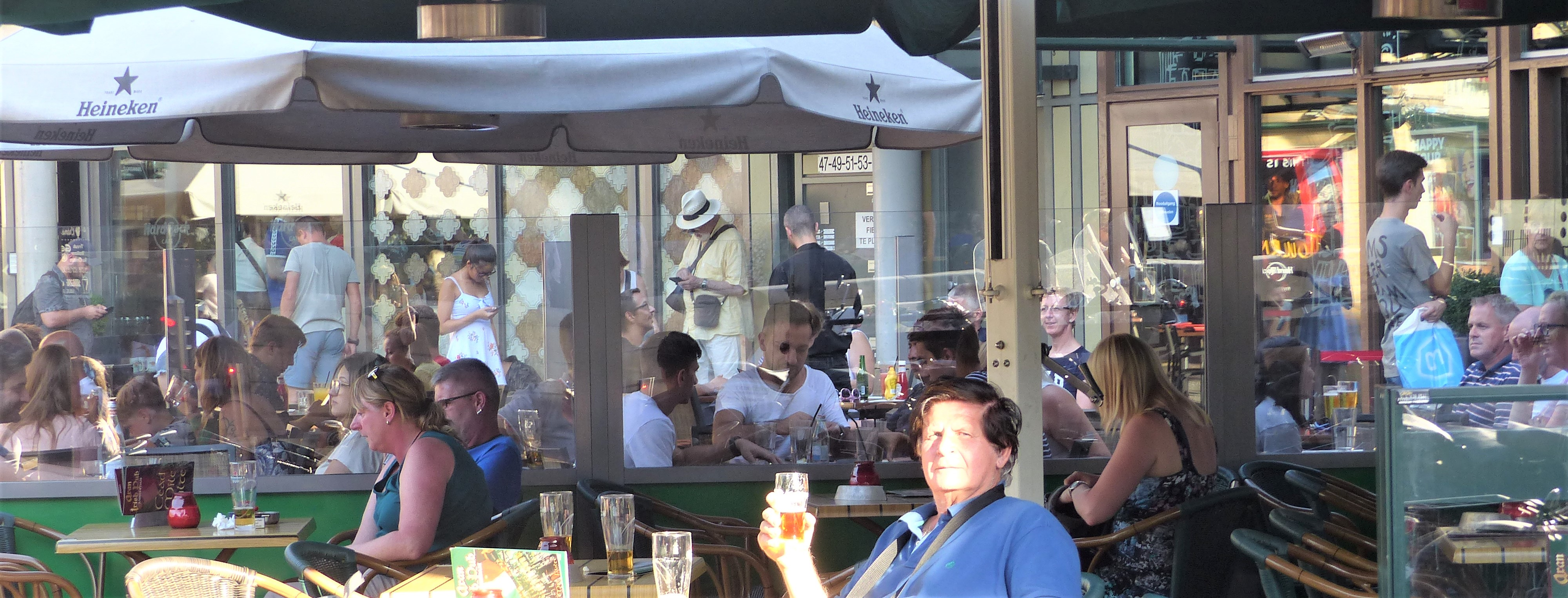
Max Euweplein – Amsterdam

In Amsterdam, there is a Max Euwe Plein (square) (near the Leidseplein) with a large chess set and statue, where the 'Max Euwe Stichting' is located in a former jailhouse. It has a Max Euwe museum and a large collection of chess books.

== Honours ==
- In 1936, Euwe was appointed Officer of the Order of Orange-Nassau.
- In 1979, Euwe was promoted to Commander of the Order of Orange-Nassau.

== Notes ==
Awards and achievements
Preceded by Alexander Alekhine	World Chess Champion; 1935–37	Succeeded by Alexander Alekhine
