= World Chess Championship 1935 =

Chess match between Alexander Alekhine and Max Euwe

	Defending champion	Challenger
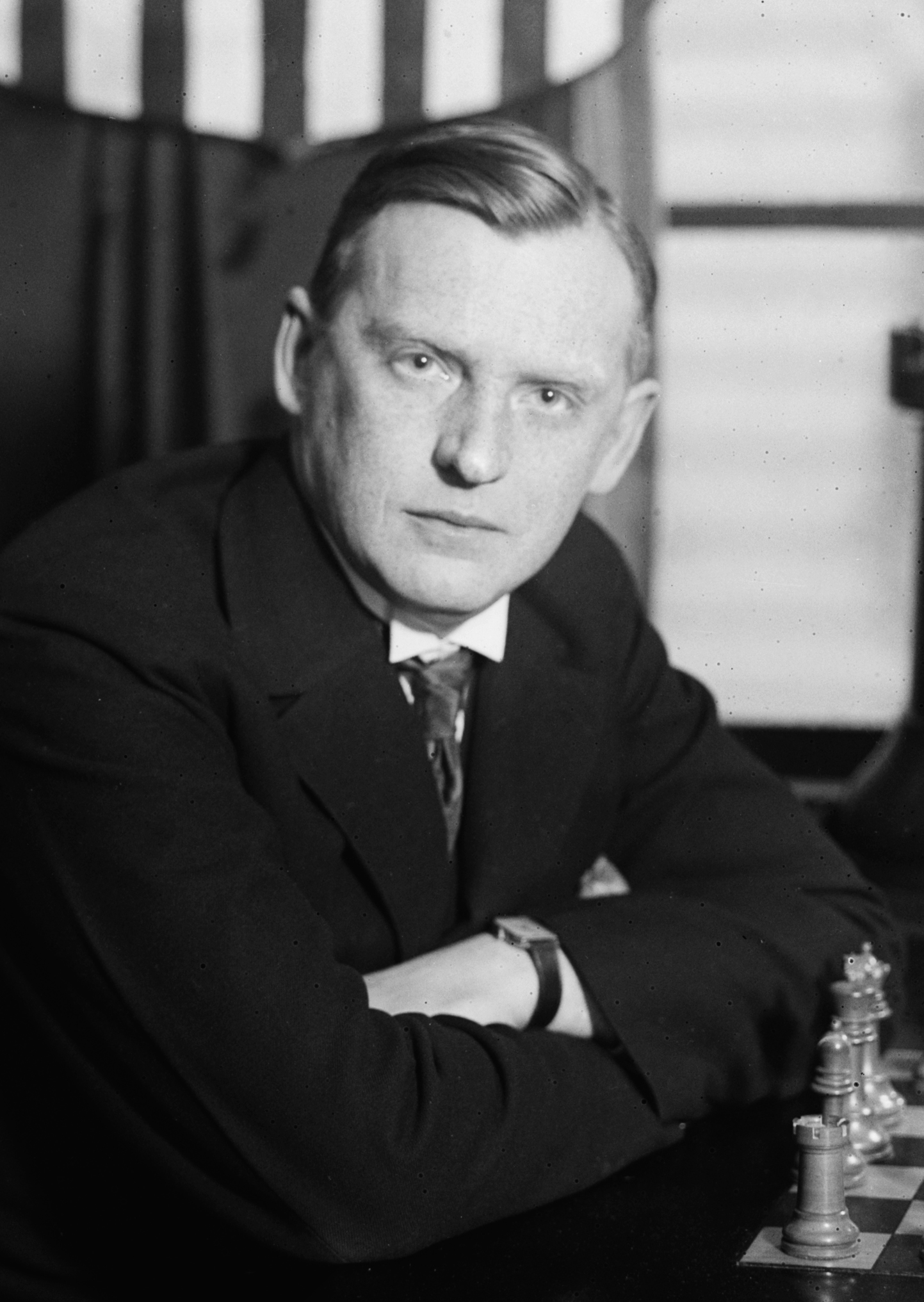
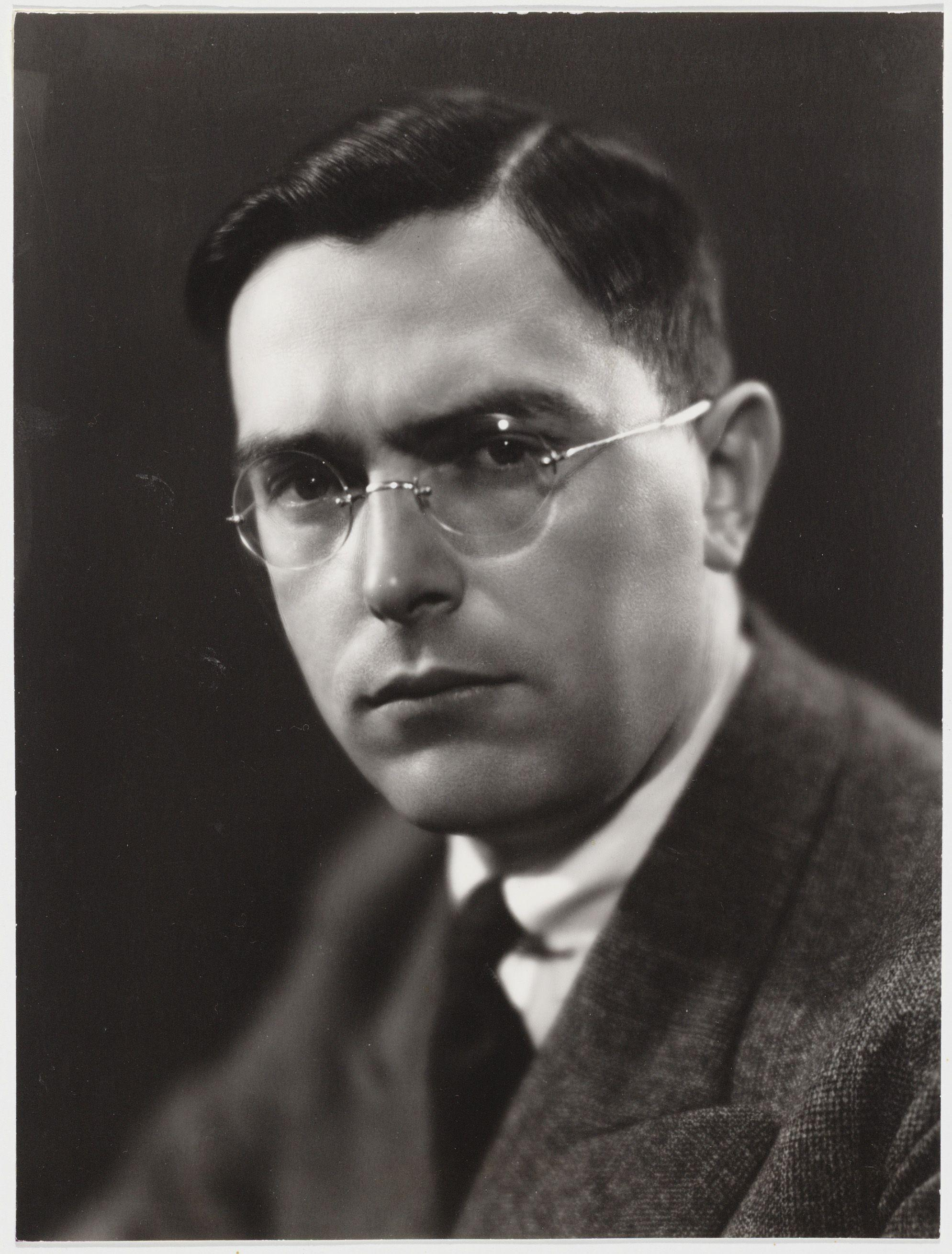
	Alexander Alekhine	Max Euwe
	(France) Alexander Alekhine	(Netherlands) Max Euwe
14½	Scores	15½
	Born 31 October 1892; 42 years old	Born 20 May 1901; 34 years old

Alekhine–Euwe (1935 film)

A World Chess Championship was played between challenger Max Euwe and title-holder Alexander Alekhine in various cities and towns in the Netherlands from 3 October to 16 December 1935. Euwe was the winner by overcoming a three-point deficit as late as the ninth game.

Earlier in 1935, Dutch radio sports journalist Han Hollander asked former world champion José Raúl Capablanca for his views on the forthcoming match. In the rare archival film footage where Capablanca and Euwe both speak, Capablanca replies: "Dr. Alekhine's game is 20% bluff. Dr. Euwe's game is clear and straightforward. Dr. Euwe's game—not so strong as Alekhine's in some respects—is more evenly balanced." Then Euwe gives his assessment in Dutch, explaining that his feelings alternated from optimism to pessimism, but in the previous ten years, their score had been evenly matched at 7–7.

== Results ==
The first player to win six games and score more than 15 points would be champion.

World Chess Championship Match 1935
	1	2	3	4	5	6	7	8	9	10	11	12	13	14	15	16	17	18	19	20	21	22	23	24	25	26	27	28	29	30	Wins	Points
Alexander Alekhine (France)	1	0	1	1	½	½	1	0	1	0	½	0	½	0	½	1	½	½	1	0	0	½	½	½	0	0	1	½	½	½	8	14½
Max Euwe (Netherlands)	0	1	0	0	½	½	0	1	0	1	½	1	½	1	½	0	½	½	0	1	1	½	½	½	1	1	0	½	½	½	9	15½

== Games ==
=== Game 1: Alekhine–Euwe, 1–0 ===
The first game of the match was won by Alekhine in 30 moves. The defending champion began the game with his Queen's Pawn, and Euwe chose the Slav Defense in response. Inaccurate play by Euwe (most notably 17...Qa5?, allowing the active continuation 18.Nd4 Bc8 19.b4!, a temporary pawn sacrifice which, if accepted, would have granted Alekhine significant activity) gave Alekhine a sizeable edge in view of Euwe's awkward piece placement and Alekhine's extra queenside space. 24...Qa5? allowed Alekhine to make a favourable piece exchange, leaving Euwe with a passive bishop restricted by its own pawns against Alekhine's excellently placed knight on f5. Euwe found himself powerless to prevent Alekhine's pieces from reaching their optimal squares, eventually culminating in the final blow 29.Nh6+!, where 29...gxh6 would have allowed 30.Qxh7#. This left only 29...Kh8, but after 30.Qxc5 Euwe resigned, as the aversion of immediate mate can only be achieved through decisive surrendering of material. For example, 30...Re8 allows 31.Qd5 or 31.Qc4, threatening a smothered mate with 32.Qg8+ Rxg8 33.Nf7#. 31...gxh6 prevents this, but enables 32.Qf7, when mate on h7 or g7 is indefensible.

1. d4 d5 2. c4 c6 3. Nf3 Nf6 4. Nc3 dxc4 5. a4 Bf5 6. Ne5 Nbd7 7. Nxc4 Qc7 8. g3 e5 9. dxe5 Nxe5 10. Bf4 Nfd7 11. Bg2 Be6 12. Nxe5 Nxe5 13. 0-0 Be7 14. Qc2 Rd8 15. Rfd1 0-0 16. Nb5 Rxd1+ 17. Rxd1 Qa5 18. Nd4 Bc8 19. b4 Qc7 20. b5 c5 21. Nf5 f6 22. Ne3 Be6 23. Bd5 Bxd5 24. Rxd5 Qa5 25. Nf5 Qe1+ 26. Kg2 Bd8 27. Bxe5 fxe5 28. Rd7 Bf6 29. Nh6+ Kh8 30. Qxc5 1–0

=== Game 2: Euwe–Alekhine, 1–0 ===
Euwe won Game 2 in 45 moves. Euwe played 1.d4 and Alekhine responded with the Grunfeld Defense. Euwe opted for the Russian Variation, an ambitious attempt to seize the centre without allowing the exchange of knights that occurs in the main line Exchange Variation. Alekhine pursued quick development, resulting in a complicated early middlegame in which both players committed errors. 13...Nd6? is given as a mistake by Euwe, who instead gives 13...Nd4! 14.f4 Bd6 15.fxe5 Bxe5 as equal. He is also critical of his own 15.Be3?, preferring the immediate clarification of the central tension with 15.fxe5. Alekhine gave up a pawn with 15...Ng4 in return for an unopposed dark-squared bishop, which soon found its way to the influential posting of g5. However, Euwe also gained the half-open h-file for his rook, in addition to a central and kingside space advantage. Alekhine sought counterplay on the queenside with 27...c6, seeking to open lines towards Euwe's king. Euwe countered this by castling and moving his king to relative safety on h3. He chose to give up his newly created passed b6 pawn in return for another one on d5, but this allowed Alekhine a chance to get back in the game with 39...Rc8!, as 40.Rxc8 Qxc8 41.Qf7+ Kh8 leads to nothing special for white. Instead, Alekhine played 39...Rxc6?, allowing Euwe's pawn to take a significant step towards promotion and clearing the a2-g8 diagonal. Euwe immediately exploited this latter aspect with 41.Bc4, the sealed move. When play resumed after the adjournment, Euwe continued to pressure the black position with 42.Qh1!, threatening 43.Kg2+ Kg7 44.Rf7+ winning the black queen. Alekhine avoided this, but soon erred further with 43...Qe8?, possibly overlooking Euwe's 45.Qb7!, when 45...Rxc4 allows 46.Rxh7+ Kxh7 47.c8=Q+ (a discovered check from the queen on b7) 47...Qe7 48.Qxe7+ Bxe7 49.Qxc4 with a huge advantage in material. Therefore, Alekhine resigned.

1. d4 Nf6 2. c4 g6 3. Nc3 d5 4. Qb3 dxc4 5. Qxc4 Be6 6. Qb5+ Nc6 7. Nf3 Rb8 8.Ne5 Bd7 9. Nxd7 Qxd7 10. d5 Nd4 11. Qd3 e5 12. e3 Nf5 13. e4 Nd6 14. f4 Qe7 15.Be3 Ng4 16. Bxa7 Ra8 17. h3 Rxa7 18. hxg4 Bg7 19. Qe3 Ra5 20. f5 Bf6 21. a4 Bh4+ 22. g3 Bg5 23. Qf3 0-0 24. b4 Raa8 25. Ra2 Ne8 26. Rb2 Nf6 27. Be2 c6 28. dxc6 bxc6 29. 0-0 Rad8 30. Kg2 Rd4 31. b5 cxb5 32. axb5 Rb8 33. fxg6 fxg6 34. b6 Qb7 35. Kh3 Rd6 36. Nd5 Kg7 37. Rc2 Nxd5 38. exd5 Rxb6 39. Rc6 Rxc6 40. dxc6 Qe7 41.Bc4 Kh6 42. Qh1 Rb2 43. Rf7 Qe8 44. c7 Rc2 45. Qb7 1–0

=== Game 3: Alekhine–Euwe, 1–0 ===
Game 3 was won by Alekhine in 41 moves. He opened with 1.e4, and Euwe chose the French Defense and the double-edged Winawer Variation. Alekhine's 4.a3 was at the time a highly uncommon continuation, although Euwe suggested it had been examined before. In the imbalanced and complicated position that resulted, Euwe was the first to err with 10...Rg6?!, attacking the queen but subtly misplacing the rook for the ensuing middlegame. Alekhine exploited this with the decisive transfer of his light-squared bishop to e4 via h5, threatening the rook, and f3, with the threat of Nh5, forking queen and rook. The placement of Alekhine's bishop provoked Euwe into playing the weakening 19...f5, after which White's advantage was clear. Alekhine converted without much difficulty.

1. e4 e6 2. d4 d5 3. Nc3 Bb4 4. a3 Bxc3+ 5. bxc3 dxe4 6. Qg4 Nf6 7. Qxg7 Rg8 8.Qh6 c5 9. Ne2 Nbd7 10. Ng3 Rg6 11. Qe3 Nd5 12. Qxe4 Nxc3 13. Qd3 Nd5 14. Be2 Qf6 15. c3 cxd4 16. cxd4 N7b6 17.Bh5 Rg7 18. Bf3 Qg6 19. Be4 f5 20. Bf3 Kf8 21. a4Rc7 22. 0-0 Bd7 23. Ba3+ Kg8 24. a5 Rc3 25. Qb1 Na4 26. Bxd5 exd5 27. Qxb7 Qc6 28. a6 Nb6 29. Bc5 f4 30. Nf5 Kh8 31. Ne7 Qe6 32. Bxb6 Bc6 33. Nxc6 Rg8 34. Ne5 Rg7 35. Qb8+ Rc8 36. Ng6+ Rxg6 37. Qxf4 Qxb6 38. Qe5+ Rg7 39. Qxd5 Rd8 40. Qe5 Qxd4 41. Qxd4 1–0

=== Game 4: Euwe–Alekhine, 0–1 ===
Alekhine won Game 4 in 44 moves, the first occasion in the match where the player with the black pieces prevailed. Opening play followed Game 2 until Alekhine deviated with 5...Bg7, which remains the most common move in top-level chess. With 8...b5!? Alekhine accepted a weak pawn on c6 in exchange for active play. Euwe's lack of kingside development gave Alekhine just enough time to activate his pieces and strike with 15...c5!, sacrificing a pawn for the bishop pair and keeping the white king stuck in the centre for the moment. The key moment arose after Alekhine's 17...Qb5. With 18.e4! Euwe would have secured the possibility of moving his bishop from d2 to either e3 or f4, thus defending his knight on e2 with his queen and preparing to castle. However, 18.Nf4? was too slow and Alekhine continued to play actively with 18...Bg4! and 20...exd4!, sacrificing the bishop to demolish white's pawn centre, thus exposing the white king to a crushing attack.

1. d4 Nf6 2. c4 g6 3. Nc3 d5 4. Qb3 dxc4 5. Qxc4 Bg7 6. Bf4 c6 7. Rd1 Qa5 8. Bd2 b5 9. Qb3 b4 10. Na4 Na6 11. e3 Be6 12. Qc2 0-0 13. b3 Rab8 14. Bd3 Rfc8 15. Ne2 c5 16. Bxa6 Qxa6 17. Nxc5 Qb5 18. Nf4 Bg4 19. f3 e5 20. Nfd3 exd4 21. fxg4 dxe3 22. Bxe3 Nxg4 23. Bf4 Bc3+ 24. Rd2 Rxc5 25. Nxc5 Qxc5 26. Bxb8 Qe7+ 27. Kd1 Ne3+ 28. Kc1 Nxc2 29. Rxc2 h5 30. Rd1 Bg7 31. h3 a5 32. Bf4 Qe4 33. Bc7 Qe3+ 34. Kb1 a4 35. bxa4 b3 36. axb3 Qxb3+ 37. Kc1 Bh6+ 38. Rdd2 Qxa4 39. Be5 Kh7 40. Bc3 Qb5 41. Bd4 Qe2 42. g4 Qe1+ 43. Kb2 Bxd2 44. Rc8 Bc1+ 0–1

=== Game 5: Alekhine–Euwe, ½–½ ===
Game 5 was the first draw of the match and was agreed after 34 moves. As in Game 3, Euwe employed the Winawer against 1.e4, but Alekhine deviated with 4.Nge2, taking the game into quieter territory. Pieces were gradually exchanged off until the players reached an endgame where Alekhine had a slightly more active position, but was unable to make any use of this due to his shattered queenside structure.

1. e4 e6 2. d4 d5 3. Nc3 Bb4 4. Nge2 dxe4 5. a3 Be7 6. Nxe4 Nc6 7. Be3 Nf6 8. N2c3 0-0 9. Ng3 b6 10. Be2 Bb7 11. 0-0 Qd7 12. Qd2 Rad8 13. Rfd1 Qc8 14. Qe1 e5 15. d5 Nd4 16. Bxd4 exd4 17. Rxd4 c5 18. Ra4 Nxd5 19. Bg4 Qc7 20. Rxa7 Nxc3 21. bxc3 Ra8 22. Rxb7 Qxb7 23. Bf3 Qd7 24. Bxa8 Rxa8 25. Qe4 Ra4 26. Qe2 Bf8 27. h3 Qe6 28. Qxe6 fxe6 29. Rb1 Rxa3 30. Ne4 Ra6 31. Kf1 Be7 32. Ke2 Kf8 33. Ke3 Bd8 34. Rd1 Ke7 ½–½

=== Game 6: Euwe–Alekhine, ½–½ ===
Game 6 was the longest of the match, eventually drawn in 73 moves. Alekhine chose the Slav Defense for the first time. Euwe opted for the quiet 4.e3, obtaining a slight edge out of the opening due to his space advantage in the centre.

1. d4 d5 2. c4 c6 3. Nf3 Nf6 4. e3 Bf5 5. cxd5 Nxd5 6. Bc4 e6 7. 0-0 Nd7 8. Qe2 Bg4 9. h3 Bh5 10. e4 N5b6 11. Bb3 Be7 12. a4 0-0 13. a5 Nc8 14. a6 Qb6 15. axb7 Qxb7 16. Ba2 c5 17. d5 Ne5 18. g4 Nxf3+ 19. Qxf3 Bg6 20. Nc3 Nb6 21. Qe2 e5 22. Be3 a6 23. h4 Bxh4 24. Bxc5 Rfc8 25. Be3 Be7 26. Rfc1 Bd6 27. Nd1 Rab8 28. Rxc8+ Rxc8 29. Bb1 Nc4 30. Bd3 Nxe3 31. Bxa6 Qa7 32. Qxe3 Bc5 33. Qd3 Rb8 34. Qe2 Qe7 35. Rc1 h5 36. Rc3 Rb4 37. Bd3 Rb8 38. Bb1 Bd4 39. Rh3 Qg5 40. Kg2 hxg4 41. Rg3 Bh5 42. Bc2 Rb6 43. Ne3 Rxb2 44. Qc4 Bxe3 45. Rxe3 Rb6 46. Qc8+ Kh7 47. Qf5+ Qxf5 48. exf5 f6 49. Rd3 Rd6 50. Rd1 Kh6 51. Kg3 Kg5 52. Be4 g6 53. fxg6 f5 54. g7 Bf7 55. Rh1 fxe4 56. Rh8 Rg6 57. d6 Rxd6 58. g8=Q+ Bxg8 59. Rxg8+ Kf5 60. Rf8+ Ke6 61. Kxg4 Rd3 62. Re8+ Kf6 63. f4 exf3 64. Rf8+ Ke6 65. Rxf3 Rd2 66. Rf1 Rd3 67. Rf3 Rd1 68. Kg3 e4 69. Rf8 Rd2 70. Re8+ Kf5 71. Re7 Ra2 72. Re8 Rb2 73. Re7 ½–½

=== Game 7: Alekhine–Euwe, 1–0 ===
Alekhine won Game 7 in 40 moves. Play followed Game 5 until Alekhine deviated with 7.g4, a riskier option which signalled his intention to take the game into sharper territory than seen in the earlier game. Alekhine continued to play aggressively with 11.g5 and 14.Nf6!, based on 14...gxf6?! 15.gxf6 Bxf6?? 16.Be4, mating. This fact granted Alekhine the bishop pair, but Euwe generated counterplay along the open d-file, trapping the white king in the centre with his actively placed queen on d3. However, 22...Qe4? was a key error, allowing Alekhine to alleviate the pressure by exchanging queens, greatly reducing the relevance of his king's central location and magnifying the importance of the bishop pair in the open position. Instead, 22...Qc2 would have kept the queens on the board and posed Alekhine some difficulties in completing development. Instead, the endgame resulting from 23.Qxe4 dxe4 as played in the game is lost for Black in view of White's bishop pair, greater activity and superior pawn structure. Euwe succeeded in exchanging the light-squared bishops, but at the cost of allowing one of Alekhine's rooks to entrench itself on the seventh rank, soon costing Euwe two pawns. Euwe resigned after 40.Rh4, when any semblance of counterplay has been all but eliminated. With this victory, Alekhine extended his lead to three games.

1. e4 e6 2. d4 d5 3. Nc3 Bb4 4. Nge2 dxe4 5. a3 Be7 6. Nxe4 Nc6 7. g4 b6 8. Bg2 Bb7 9. c3 Nf6 10. N2g3 0-0 11. g5 Nxe4 12. Nxe4 Kh8 13. Qh5 Qe8 14. Nf6 Bxf6 15. gxf6 gxf6 16. Qh4 Qd8 17. Bf4 e5 18. Bg3 f5 19. dxe5 Rg8 20. Bf3 Qd3 21. Be2 Qe4 22. Qxe4 fxe4 23. Bh4 h6 24. 0-0-0 Rae8 25. Bf6+ Kh7 26. f4 exf3 27. Bxf3 Na5 28. Bxb7 Nxb7 29. Rd7 Nc5 30. Rxf7+ Kg6 31. Rxc7 Nd3+ 32. Kb1 Kf5 33. Rd1 Nxe5 34. Rf1+ Ke4 35. Rxa7 Nc4 36. Rd7 Ke3 37. Re1+ Kf3 38. Rxe8 Rxe8 39. Rd4 Ne3 40. Rh4 1–0

=== Game 8: Euwe–Alekhine, 1–0 ===
Game 8 was won by Euwe in 69 moves. Again, Alekhine went for the Slav, but opted to allow a transposition to the Semi-Slav with 4...e6 instead of 4...Bf5 as in Game 6. Alekhine's 10...Qb6?! has been superseded by 10...Bd7 in modern practice, most notably Ponomariov-Toplaov, Sofia (2006). One reason is that the natural 11.Rc1 as played by Euwe forces Bd7 anyway, whereas after 10...Bd7 Black can meet 11.Rc1 with 11...c5, opening up an attack on the white queen. In this game, after 12.Ne5, Alekhine felt obliged to capture on b2, temporarily going up a pawn but falling further behind in development. Euwe found an innovative way of completing development with 15.Ke2, allowing the kingside rook to develop with the need to castle, as this was impossible due to the black queen's pressure on the dark-squared bishop. The king was also better placed on e2 than it would have been on g1 in the resulting endgame. Euwe stood substantially better due to his bishop pair and passed a-pawn. Alekhine gave up a pawn to transition the game to a rook and opposite-coloured bishops ending, but the survival of Euwe's passed pawn on a6 ensured he had excellent winning chances. The final 69.Ba6!, the only winning move, is a nice touch, as if 69...Rxa6 then 70.Rd8+ will also cover the pawn's queening square, allowing promotion on the next move. Black would be forced to give up the rook for the new queen, leaving Euwe up the exchange and a pawn, with a winning endgame. Thus, Euwe cut the deficit to two games.

1. d4 d5 2. c4 c6 3. Nf3 Nf6 4. e3 e6 5. Nc3 a6 6. c5 b6 7. cxb6 Nbd7 8. Na4 Nxb6 9. Bd2 Nxa4 10. Qxa4 Qb6 11. Rc1 Bd7 12. Ne5 Qxb2 13. Nxd7 Nxd7 14. Bd3 Rb8 15. Ke2 Rb6 16. Rb1 Qa3 17. Qxa3 Bxa3 18. Rxb6 Nxb6 19. Rb1 Nd7 20. Bxa6 Ke7 21. Rb3 Bd6 22. Bb7 c5 23. a4 Bb8 24. Rb5 Ba7 25. dxc5 Nxc5 26. Bb4 Kd6 27. a5 Kc7 28. Bxc5 Bxc5 29. Bxd5 Kd6 30. Bb7 Ba7 31. a6 Rd8 32. Rb2 Rd7 33. Rd2+ Ke7 34. Rc2 Rd6 35. Rc7+ Rd7 36. Rc2 Rd6 37. f4 f5 38. Rc8 Rd8 39. Rc7+ Rd7 40. Rc3 Rd6 41. Rc7+ Rd7 42. Rc3 Rd6 43. h4 g6 44. Rc2 h5 45. Rc3 Rb6 46. Rc7+ Kd6 47. Rg7 Rb2+ 48. Kd3 Ra2 49. Rxg6 Ra3+ 50. Kc4 Bxe3 51. Bd5 Bxf4 52. Rxe6+ Kc7 53. Rc6+ Kb8 54. Rg6 Bc7 55. Bb7 Ka7 56. Rg5 Bd8 57. Rxh5 Bxh4 58. Rxf5 Kb6 59. Rb5+ Kc7 60. Rb3 Ra5 61. Kd4 Bf2+ 62. Ke4 Kd6 63. Rd3+ Ke6 64. Bc8+ Ke7 65. Rd5 Ra4+ 66. Kf5 Bg3 67. Rd7+ Kf8 68. a7 Bf2 69. Ba6 1–0

=== Game 9: Alekhine–Euwe, 1–0 ===
Game was won by Alekhine in 41 moves. For the fourth consecutive game where Alekhine had the white pieces, the players entered the Winawer Variation of the French Defense. However, Alekhine played 4.Qg4, a move thus far unseen in the match. The move essentially forces black to sacrifice the g7 pawn for activity, resulting in sharp play. Alekhine ultimately had the better of a complicated struggle, emerging with an extra, passed, h-pawn, which ultimately cost Euwe his bishop.

1. e4 e6 2. d4 d5 3. Nc3 Bb4 4. Qg4 Nf6 5. Qxg7 Rg8 6. Qh6 Rg6 7. Qe3 Nxe4 8. Bd3 f5 9. Nge2 c5 10. Bxe4 fxe4 11. Qh3 Nc6 12. Qxh7 Qf6 13. Nf4 cxd4 14. Nxg6 dxc3 15. b3 Ne7 16. Nxe7 Bxe7 17. h4 Qf7 18. Qh8+ Qf8 19. Qxf8+ Kxf8 20. Bg5 e5 21. f3 exf3 22. gxf3 Ba3 23. f4 Bf5 24. fxe5 Bxc2 25. 0-0+ Kg8 26. Rac1 Bxc1 27. Rxc1 Bf5 28. Rxc3 Rc8 29. Rf3 Rf8 30. Bf6 Be4 31. Rg3+ Kf7 32. h5 Rc8 33. Rg7+ Ke6 34. h6 d4 35. h7 Rc1+ 36. Kf2 Rc2+ 37. Kg3 Bxh7 38. Rxh7 Rxa2 39. Kf4 b5 40. Ke4 Re2+ 41. Kxd4 1–0

=== Game 10: Euwe–Alekhine, 1–0 ===
Euwe won Game 10 in 41 moves. Opening play followed Game 8 until Alekhine deviated with 6...Nbd7. 8...Ne4? is a significant positional mistake, allowing Euwe to create a target on e4 to attack and set up a bind on the central and queenside dark squares. Alekhine was forced into increasingly desperate measures to shake Euwe's control, sacrificing a pawn with 21...e5 to allow his light-squared bishop to develop. Alekhine strove to open up lines towards Euwe's king, but 28...h4? was too hasty, and after 29.gxh4 Qxh4 30.Ng6, he was losing the exchange, an advantage which Euwe swiftly converted, ending the game with 41.Rxc6! as 41...bxc6 allows 42.b7 and promotion next move.

1. d4 d5 2. c4 c6 3. Nf3 Nf6 4. e3 e6 5. Nc3 a6 6. c5 Nbd7 7. b4 a5 8. b5 Ne4 9. Nxe4 dxe4 10. Nd2 f5 11. f3 Qh4+ 12. g3 Qh6 13. Qe2 Be7 14. Bg2 0-0 15. 0-0 Nf6 16. Nc4 Bd8 17. fxe4 fxe4 18. Nd6 Qg6 19. b6 Be7 20. Nc4 Qg5 21. Bd2 e5 22. Nxe5 Be6 23. Rf4 Qh6 24. a3 g5 25. Rf2 Qg7 26. Raf1 h5 27. Kh1 Qh7 28. Bc3 h4 29. gxh4 Qxh4 30. Ng6 Qh7 31. Nxf8 Rxf8 32. d5 Nxd5 33. Rxf8+ Bxf8 34. Bd4 Be7 35. Qf2 Qh4 36. Qxh4 gxh4 37. Bxe4 Bd8 38. Bf5 Bxf5 39. Rxf5 Ne7 40. Rf6 Nc8 41. Rxc6 1–0

=== Game 11: Alekhine–Euwe, ½–½ ===
Game 11 was drawn in 30 moves. Alekhine reverted to 1.d4 for the first time since Game 1. As before, Euwe chose the Slav Defense in response. Alekhine deviated with 4.e3, the so-called Quiet Variation and 5.cxd5 further indicated his unambitious intentions, as the resulting pawn structure is symmetrical and the position offers limited chances for either side to outplay the other. A drawn queen and bishop endgame swiftly occurred.

1. d4 d5 2. c4 c6 3. Nf3 Nf6 4. e3 Bf5 5. cxd5 cxd5 6. Nc3 e6 7. Ne5 Nfd7 8. Qb3 Qc8 9. Bd2 Nc6 10. Rc1 Be7 11. Be2 Ndxe5 12. dxe5 0-0 13. Nb5 Qd7 14. 0-0 a6 15. Nd4 Nxd4 16. exd4 Rac8 17. Bb4 Bxb4 18. Qxb4 Rc2 19. Rxc2 Bxc2 20. Rc1 Rc8 21. h3 Rc6 22. Qa5 h6 23. b4 Ba4 24. Rxc6 Qxc6 25. Qd8+ Qe8 26. Qc7 Qc6 27. Qb8+ Kh7 28. Bd3+ g6 29. Kh2 Kg7 30. Qd8 Bc2 ½–½

=== Game 12: Euwe–Alekhine, 1–0 ===
Euwe won Game 12 in 36 moves to cut Alekhine's lead to a single game. Opening play followed Game 4 until Euwe deviated with 6.e4. Alekhine sacrificed a pawn but was the first to err with 9...Qe8?, after which black's compensation for the pawn is virtually nothing. Alekhine chose to give up a piece to rid white of his centre, but Euwe comfortably consolidated and efficiently converted.

1. d4 Nf6 2. c4 g6 3. Nc3 d5 4. Qb3 dxc4 5. Qxc4 Bg7 6. e4 0-0 7. Nf3 a6 8. Bf4 b5 9. Qxc7 Qe8 10. Be2 Nc6 11. d5 Nb4 12. 0-0 Nxe4 13. Nxe4 Nxd5 14. Qc1 Bf5 15. Ng3 Rc8 16. Qd2 Nxf4 17. Qxf4 Bc2 18. Qb4 Qd8 19. Ne1 Ba4 20. Rb1 Bd4 21. Nf3 Bc5 22. Qh4 Bc2 23. Rbc1 f6 24. Bc4+ bxc4 25. Qxc4+ Kg7 26. Qxc2 Qa5 27. Qe2 e5 28. a3 Be7 29. Nd4 Rxc1 30. Rxc1 Kh8 31. Nc6 Qc7 32. Qxa6 Rc8 33. Nf1 Rb8 34. Nxe7 Qxe7 35. Rc8+ Rxc8 36. Qxc8+ 1–0

=== Game 13: Alekhine–Euwe, ½–½ ===
1. e4 e5 2. Nf3 Nc6 3. Bb5 a6 4. Ba4 Nf6 5. 0-0 Nxe4 6. d4 b5 7. Bb3 d5 8. dxe5 Be6 9. c3 Be7 10. a4 b4 11. Nd4 Nxe5 12. f4 Nc4 13. f5 Bc8 14. Qe1 Bb7 15. cxb4 c5 16. f6 Bxf6 17. Nf5 0-0 18. bxc5 Re8 19. Qb4 Qc8 20. Bxc4 a5 21. Qa3 dxc4 22. Nc3 Nxc5 23. Be3 Qc6 24. Rf3 Nd3 25. Raf1 Rxe3 26. Nxe3 Bd4 27. Qe7 Ne5 28. Kh1 Nxf3 29. Rxf3 Rf8 30. h3 Bxe3 31. Qxe3 Qe6 32. Rg3 Re8 33. Qg5 Qe5 34. Qxe5 Rxe5 35. Rg4 Re3 36. Kg1 Rd3 37. Rxc4 Rd2 38. b4 Rxg2+ 39. Kf1 Rb2 40. Rd4 g6 41. bxa5 Rc2 42. Nb5 Kg7 43. Ke1 Rc5 44. Rd6 Bc6 45. a6 Bxb5 46. a7 Bc6 47. Rxc6 Ra5 48. Rc7 Rxa4 49. Kd2 g5 50. Kc3 h5 51. Kb3 Ra1 52. Kc4 g4 53. hxg4 hxg4 54. Kd4 Kg6 55. Ke5 f6+ 56. Kf4 Ra4+ 57. Kg3 f5 58. Kh4 Kf6 59. Rb7 ½–½

=== Game 14: Euwe–Alekhine, 1–0 ===
1. d4 Nf6 2. c4 g6 3. Nc3 d5 4. Bf4 Nh5 5. Be5 f6 6. Bg3 Nxg3 7. hxg3 c6 8. e3 Bg7 9. Bd3 0-0 10. Rxh7 f5 11. Rh1 e5 12. dxe5 Bxe5 13. Nf3 Bxc3+ 14. bxc3 Qf6 15. cxd5 Qxc3+ 16. Kf1 Qf6 17. Rc1 cxd5 18. Rc7 Nd7 19. Bb5 Qd6 20. Rc4 Nf6 21. Rch4 Qc5 22. Ba4 Qc3 23. Ng5 Kg7 24. Nh7 Rd8 25. Nxf6 Kxf6 26. Rh7 Be6 27. R1h6 Bf7 28. Kg1 Rg8 29. g4 Rg7 30. gxf5 Rxh7 31. Rxh7 gxf5 32. Bb3 Qe5 33. Qf3 Rc8 34. g4 Bg6 35. Rxb7 Qa1+ 36. Kg2 Rh8 37. g5+ Kxg5 38. Qf4+ Kf6 39. Qd6+ Kg5 40. f4+ Kh6 41. Qe7 1–0

=== Game 15: Alekhine–Euwe, ½–½ ===
1. d4 d5 2. c4 c6 3. Nf3 Nf6 4. Nc3 dxc4 5. a4 Bf5 6. Nh4 Bc8 7. e3 e5 8. dxe5 Qxd1+ 9. Nxd1 Bb4+ 10. Bd2 Bxd2+ 11. Kxd2 Ne4+ 12. Ke1 Be6 13. f4 Na6 14. Nf2 Nxf2 15. Kxf2 0-0-0 16. Nf3 Nc5 17. Be2 Nd3+ 18. Kg3 Nxb2 19. Nd4 Rxd4 20. exd4 Rd8 21. Kf2 Rxd4 22. Ke3 c5 23. Ra3 Bf5 24. g4 Be4 25. Rf1 Bc6 26. a5 Nd3 27. Rc3 Re4+ 28. Kd2 Nxf4 29. Bxc4 Rd4+ 30. Kc2 Be4+ 31. Kb3 g5 32. Bxf7 b6 33. Ka3 Kd7 34. Bb3 Kc6 35. Rc4 Rxc4 36. Bxc4 b5 37. Bf7 c4 38. Kb4 Nd3+ 39. Kc3 Nxe5 40. Be8+ Kc5 41. Bxb5 Bd3 42. Re1 Ng6 43. Ba6 Nf4 44. Bb7 Ne2+ 45. Kd2 Nd4 46. Re7 Kb4 47. Be4 Bxe4 48. Rxe4 Nf3+ 49. Ke2 Nxh2 50. Kf2 a6 51. Ke2 Kxa5 52. Rxc4 Kb5 53. Re4 a5 54. Re5+ Kb4 55. Rxg5 a4 56. Kd3 a3 57. Kc2 a2 58. Kb2 a1=Q+ 59. Kxa1 Kc3 60. Rg7 h6 61. Rg6 Kd3 ½–½

=== Game 16: Euwe–Alekhine, 0–1 ===
1. d4 d5 2. c4 c6 3. Nf3 Nf6 4. e3 Bf5 5. cxd5 cxd5 6. Nc3 e6 7. Qb3 Qc8 8. Bd2 Nc6 9. Rc1 Be7 10. Bb5 0-0 11. 0-0 Qd8 12. Na4 Na5 13. Bxa5 Qxa5 14. Nc5 Bxc5 15. dxc5 Ne4 16. Qa4 Qxa4 17. Bxa4 Rfc8 18. c6 bxc6 19. Bxc6 Rab8 20. Nd4 Rxb2 21. Nxf5 exf5 22. Bxd5 Nc3 23. Kh1 g6 24. Bb3 Rc5 25. f3 a5 26. e4 a4 27. Bd5 Rbb5 28. h3 Kg7 29. Rc2 Nxd5 30. Rxc5 Rxc5 31. exd5 Rxd5 32. Rf2 Kf6 33. Re2 Re5 34. Rc2 Re3 35. Kh2 Ra3 36. Kg3 Ke5 37. Rd2 h6 38. h4 h5 39. Re2+ Kd6 40. Kf4 f6 41. Rc2 Kd5 42. g3 g5+ 43. hxg5 fxg5+ 44. Kxg5 Rxf3 45. Rg2 Kd4 46. Kxh5 f4 47. gxf4 Rxf4 48. Kg5 Re4 49. Kf5 Re5+ 50. Kf4 Re1 51. Kf3 Kd3 52. Rb2 Rf1+ 53. Kg3 Kc3 54. Rb7 Rc1 55. Rb8 Ra1 56. Kf3 Rxa2 57. Ke3 Rh2 58. Rc8+ Kb2 59. Rb8+ Kc1 60. Rc8+ Kb1 61. Rb8+ Rb2 62. Ra8 Rb3+ 63. Kd4 a3 64. Kc4 Kb2 65. Rh8 Rc3+ 0–1

=== Game 17: Alekhine–Euwe, ½–½ ===
1. d4 d5 2. Nf3 Nf6 3. e3 Bf5 4. Bd3 e6 5. Bxf5 exf5 6. Qd3 Qc8 7. b3 Na6 8. 0-0 Be7 9. c4 0-0 10. Nc3 c6 11. Bb2 Ne4 12. Rfc1 Rd8 13. Qe2 Qe6 14. a3 Nc7 15. c5 Re8 16. b4 f4 17. exf4 Nxc3 18. Qxe6 Nxe6 19. Rxc3 Nxf4 20. Rb3 a6 21. g3 Ne6 22. a4 Bf6 23. Rd1 ½–½

=== Game 18: Euwe–Alekhine, ½–½ ===
1. c4 e5 2. Nf3 e4 3. Nd4 Nc6 4. Nc2 Nf6 5. Nc3 Bc5 6. b3 0-0 7. g3 d5 8. cxd5 Nb4 9. Nxb4 Bxb4 10. Bg2 Re8 11. 0-0 Bf5 12. Bb2 Nxd5 13. Nxd5 Qxd5 14. d3 Rad8 15. dxe4 Bxe4 16. Qxd5 ½–½

=== Game 19: Alekhine–Euwe, 1–0 ===
1. d4 d5 2. c4 c6 3. Nf3 Nf6 4. Nc3 dxc4 5. a4 e6 6. e4 Bb4 7. e5 Ne4 8. Qc2 Qd5 9. Be2 c5 10. 0-0 Nxc3 11. bxc3 cxd4 12. cxd4 c3 13. Bd2 Qa5 14. Bxc3 Bxc3 15. Ra3 Nc6 16. Rxc3 Bd7 17. Rb1 0-0 18. Rc5 Qd8 19. Rxb7 Bc8 20. Rb1 Nxd4 21. Nxd4 Qxd4 22. Bf3 Bd7 23. Bxa8 Rxa8 24. a5 g6 25. Rd1 Qb4 26. Qc4 Rb8 27. Qxb4 Rxb4 28. h3 Bb5 29. Rd8+ Kg7 30. Rcc8 Rb1+ 31. Kh2 Rb2 32. Kg3 Rb3+ 33. f3 Rb2 34. Rg8+ Kh6 35. Rc7 Bf1 36. Rxf7 Rxg2+ 37. Kf4 g5+ 38. Ke3 Re2+ 39. Kd4 Rd2+ 40. Ke3 Re2+ 41. Kd4 Rd2+ 42. Kc3 Rd3+ 43. Kc2 Ra3 44. f4 gxf4 45. Rxf4 Be2 46. Rf6+ Kh5 47. Kd2 Bc4 48. Rg7 h6 49. Rgg6 Rd3+ 50. Kc2 Rd8 51. Rxh6+ Kg5 52. Kc3 Bd5 53. Kd4 Bh1+ 54. Ke3 Bd5 55. Rhg6+ Kh5 56. Kf4 Rh8 57. h4 1–0

=== Game 20: Euwe–Alekhine, 1–0 ===
1. d4 d5 2. c4 c6 3. Nf3 Nf6 4. Nc3 dxc4 5. a4 Bf5 6. Ne5 Nbd7 7. Nxc4 Qc7 8. g3 e5 9. dxe5 Nxe5 10. Bf4 Nfd7 11. Bg2 f6 12. 0-0 Rd8 13. Qc1 Qb8 14. Ne4 Be7 15. Qc3 0-0 16. Rad1 Be6 17. Nxe5 Nxe5 18. Ng5 fxg5 19. Bxe5 Bf6 20. Bxb8 Bxc3 21. Bd6 Rf7 22. bxc3 Rfd7 23. Rb1 Rxd6 24. Rxb7 R8d7 25. Rxd7 Bxd7 26. Be4 c5 27. c4 Bxa4 28. Bd5+ Kf8 29. Ra1 Ra6 30. Ra2 Ke7 31. f4 gxf4 32. gxf4 Kf6 33. e4 g5 34. f5 h5 35. h4 gxh4 36. Kh2 Kg5 37. Kh3 Ra5 38. Bb7 Kf6 39. Bd5 Kg5 40. Bb7 Kf6 41. Bc8 1–0

=== Game 21: Alekhine–Euwe, 0–1 ===
1. d4 d5 2. c4 c6 3. Nf3 Nf6 4. Nc3 dxc4 5. a4 Bf5 6. Ne5 Nbd7 7. Nxc4 Qc7 8. g3 e5 9. dxe5 Nxe5 10. Bf4 Nfd7 11. Bg2 Rd8 12. Qc1 f6 13. 0-0 Be6 14. Nxe5 Nxe5 15. a5 a6 16. Ne4 Bb4 17. Nc5 Bc8 18. Bxe5 fxe5 19. f4 Bd2 20. Qc4 Rd4 21. Qb3 exf4 22. gxf4 Qe7 23. Nd3 Be6 24. Qa3 Bc4 25. Kh1 Qxa3 26. Rxa3 0-0 27. Ra4 Rfd8 28. Ra3 Bxd3 29. exd3 Rb4 30. Rf2 Rxb2 31. Bf1 Rd4 32. f5 Rf4 33. Rxf4 Bxf4 34. h3 Bd6 35. Ra1 Kf7 36. d4 Kf6 37. Re1 Bb4 38. Ra1 Rd2 39. Bc4 Rxd4 40. Be6 Rd3 0–1

=== Game 22: Euwe–Alekhine, ½–½ ===
1. d4 e6 2. c4 Nf6 3. Nc3 Bb4 4. Qc2 Nc6 5. Nf3 d6 6. Bd2 0-0 7. a3 Bxc3 8. Bxc3 Qe7 9. e3 e5 10. d5 Nb8 11. Bd3 Nbd7 12. Ng5 g6 13. Ne4 Nxe4 14. Bxe4 Nc5 15. 0-0 Nxe4 16. Qxe4 Bf5 17. Qf3 Qh4 18. Qe2 ½–½

=== Game 23: Alekhine–Euwe, ½–½ ===
1. d4 d5 2. c4 c6 3. Nf3 Nf6 4. Nc3 dxc4 5. e3 b5 6. a4 b4 7. Nb1 Ba6 8. Be2 e6 9. Ne5 Be7 10. 0-0 0-0 11. Nxc4 c5 12. dxc5 Nbd7 13. c6 Nc5 14. Nbd2 Qc7 15. Qc2 Rad8 16. Bf3 Nd5 17. b3 Bf6 18. Bb2 Bxb2 19. Qxb2 Qxc6 20. Rfd1 Qc7 21. Bxd5 Rxd5 22. e4 Rd3 23. Qe5 Qxe5 24. Nxe5 Rxd2 25. Rxd2 Nxb3 26. Rad1 Nxd2 27. Rxd2 Rc8 28. f4 f6 29. Nf3 Kf8 30. Rb2 Rc4 31. Nd2 Rd4 32. Nb3 Rxe4 33. Nc5 Re1+ 34. Kf2 Rf1+ 35. Ke3 Bc4 36. Rxb4 Bd5 37. Rb8+ Ke7 38. Rg8 Kd6 39. Ne4+ Bxe4 40. Kxe4 Ra1 41. Rxg7 Rxa4+ 42. Kf3 h5 43. Rf7 Ra3+ 44. Kf2 f5 45. Rh7 Kd5 46. Rxh5 Ke4 47. Rh6 Ra6 48. Kg3 Rd6 49. Rh7 Rd3+ 50. Kf2 Kxf4 51. Rxa7 Rd2+ 52. Kf1 e5 53. Rg7 Ke3 54. Rg3+ Kd4 55. h4 e4 56. h5 Rd1+ 57. Kf2 Rh1 58. Rg5 ½–½

=== Game 24: Euwe–Alekhine, ½–½ ===
1. d4 e6 2. c4 f5 3. g3 Bb4+ 4. Bd2 Be7 5. Bg2 Nf6 6. Nc3 0-0 7. Nf3 Ne4 8. 0-0 Bf6 9. Nxe4 fxe4 10. Ne1 Bxd4 11. Bxe4 Bxb2 12. Bxh7+ Kxh7 13. Qc2+ Kg8 14. Qxb2 Nc6 15. Nf3 d6 16. c5 dxc5 17. Bc3 Qe7 18. Rad1 b6 19. Qc2 Bb7 20. Qg6 Qf7 21. Qg5 Rad8 22. h4 Rxd1 23. Rxd1 Nd4 24. Bxd4 cxd4 25. Rxd4 Bxf3 26. Rf4 Qh5 27. Rxf8+ Kxf8 28. Qf4+ Qf7 29. Qxf3 Qxf3 30. exf3 e5 31. Kf1 b5 32. Ke2 c5 33. Ke3 ½–½

=== Game 25: Alekhine–Euwe, 0–1 ===
1. d4 d5 2. c4 c6 3. Nf3 Nf6 4. Nc3 e6 5. Bg5 Nbd7 6. e3 Qa5 7. cxd5 Nxd5 8. Qd2 N7b6 9. Bd3 Nxc3 10. bxc3 Nd5 11. Rc1 Nxc3 12. 0-0 Bb4 13. a3 Qxa3 14. Ra1 Qb3 15. Bc2 Qd5 16. e4 Nxe4 17. Qxb4 Nxg5 18. Ne5 a5 19. Qa3 f6 20. Bg6+ hxg6 21. Nxg6 Nf3+ 22. Qxf3 Qxf3 23. gxf3 Rh5 24. Nf4 Rf5 25. Nd3 Rxf3 26. Nc5 b6 27. Kg2 Rf4 28. Nb3 e5 29. dxe5 Be6 30. Nc1 0-0-0 31. exf6 Rg4+ 32. Kf3 Rf8 33. Ke3 Rxf6 34. f4 g5 35. Nd3 Bc4 36. f5 Rh4 37. Rad1 Rxh2 38. Ke4 Re2+ 39. Kf3 Re8 40. Kg4 Rd8 41. Ne5 Rxd1 42. Rxd1 Be2+ 43. Kxg5 Rxf5+ 44. Kxf5 Bxd1 45. Nxc6 a4 0–1

=== Game 26: Euwe–Alekhine, 1–0 ===
1. d4 e6 2. c4 f5 3. g3 Bb4+ 4. Bd2 Be7 5. Bg2 Nf6 6. Nc3 0-0 7. Nf3 Ne4 8. 0-0 b6 9. Qc2 Bb7 10. Ne5 Nxc3 11. Bxc3 Bxg2 12. Kxg2 Qc8 13. d5 d6 14. Nd3 e5 15. Kh1 c6 16. Qb3 Kh8 17. f4 e4 18. Nb4 c5 19. Nc2 Nd7 20. Ne3 Bf6 21. Nxf5 Bxc3 22. Nxd6 Qb8 23. Nxe4 Bf6 24. Nd2 g5 25. e4 gxf4 26. gxf4 Bd4 27. e5 Qe8 28. e6 Rg8 29. Nf3 Qg6 30. Rg1 Bxg1 31. Rxg1 Qf6 32. Ng5 Rg7 33. exd7 Rxd7 34. Qe3 Re7 35. Ne6 Rf8 36. Qe5 Qxe5 37. fxe5 Rf5 38. Re1 h6 39. Nd8 Rf2 40. e6 Rd2 41. Nc6 Re8 42. e7 b5 43. Nd8 Kg7 44. Nb7 Kf6 45. Re6+ Kg5 46. Nd6 Rxe7 47. Ne4+ 1–0

=== Game 27: Alekhine–Euwe, 1–0 ===
1. e4 e5 2. Nc3 Nf6 3. Bc4 Nxe4 4. Qh5 Nd6 5. Bb3 Be7 6. Nf3 Nc6 7. Nxe5 Nxe5 8. Qxe5 0-0 9. Nd5 Re8 10. 0-0 Bf8 11. Qf4 c6 12. Ne3 Qa5 13. d4 Qh5 14. c3 Ne4 15. f3 Ng5 16. d5 cxd5 17. Nxd5 Ne6 18. Qg4 Qg6 19. Be3 b6 20. Rad1 Bb7 21. Qxg6 hxg6 22. Rfe1 Rac8 23. Kf2 Bc5 24. Bxc5 Bxd5 25. Bxd5 Nxc5 26. Rxe8+ Rxe8 27. b4 Ne6 28. Bxe6 dxe6 29. Rd7 Rc8 30. Rxa7 Rxc3 31. Ra8+ Kh7 32. a4 Rb3 33. b5 g5 34. Ke2 e5 35. Kd2 f6 36. Kc2 Rb4 37. Kc3 Rd4 38. Ra6 Kg6 39. Rxb6 Rxa4 40. Ra6 Rd4 41. b6 1–0

=== Game 28: Euwe–Alekhine, ½–½ ===
1. d4 Nf6 2. c4 e6 3. Nc3 d5 4. Bg5 Be7 5. e3 Nbd7 6. Nf3 0-0 7. Rc1 c6 8. Bd3 h6 9. Bh4 dxc4 10. Bxc4 b5 11. Bd3 a6 12. e4 Nxe4 13. Bxe4 Bxh4 14. Bxc6 Ra7 15. 0-0 Nb6 16. Ne4 Be7 17. Ne5 Rc7 18. Qd3 Nc4 19. Nxc4 Rxc6 20. Ne5 Rxc1 21. Rxc1 Bb7 22. Nc5 Bxc5 23. Rxc5 Qd6 24. a4 bxa4 25. Nc4 Qf4 26. Qe3 Qg4 27. f3 Qg6 28. Nd6 Bd5 29. Qc3 Kh7 30. Qc2 Qxc2 31. Rxc2 Kg6 32. Rc8 Rxc8 33. Nxc8 Kf6 34. Kf2 g5 35. Nb6 Bc6 36. Nc4 Ke7 37. Ne3 Kd6 38. Ke2 f5 39. g3 Bb5+ 40. Kd2 f4 41. gxf4 gxf4 42. Ng2 e5 43. dxe5+ Kxe5 44. Kc3 Bf1 45. Ne1 Kd6 46. Nc2 Kc5 47. Nd4 Bh3 48. Ne2 Bg2 49. Nxf4 Bxf3 50. Nd3+ Kb5 51. Ne5 Bh5 52. Nc4 Bg4 53. Nd6+ Kc5 54. Nf7 h5 55. Ne5 Bf5 56. Nc4 Be4 57. Nd2 Bg2 58. h4 Kd5 59. Nc4 Ke4 60. Nd6+ Kd5 61. Ne8 Kc5 62. Nf6 Bf3 63. b3 ½–½

=== Game 29: Alekhine–Euwe, ½–½ ===
1. e4 Nf6 2. e5 Nd5 3. d4 d6 4. c4 Nb6 5. Nf3 Bg4 6. Be2 dxe5 7. c5 e4 8. cxb6 exf3 9. Bxf3 Bxf3 10. Qxf3 axb6 11. Qxb7 Nd7 12. Bf4 e5 13. Bxe5 Nxe5 14. dxe5 Bb4+ 15. Nc3 Bxc3+ 16. bxc3 0-0 17. 0-0 Qe7 18. Rfe1 Qc5 19. Re3 Ra3 20. Qf3 Re8 21. h3 Ra5 22. Rd1 Qe7 23. Qc6 Rc5 24. Qd7 g6 25. f4 Rc4 26. Qxe7 Rxe7 27. Rd4 Rc5 28. Kf2 c6 29. a4 Ra7 30. Rb4 b5 31. axb5 cxb5 32. Kf3 Rac7 33. Rb3 Kf8 34. g4 Ke7 35. f5 gxf5 36. gxf5 f6 37. Kf4 fxe5+ 38. Rxe5+ Rxe5 39. Kxe5 Rc5+ 40. Ke4 Kf6 41. Ra3 Rc4+ 42. Kd3 Rh4 43. Rb3 Kxf5 44. Rxb5+ Ke6 45. c4 Rxh3+ 46. Kd4 Kd6 47. Rb6+ Kc7 48. Rf6 Rh5 49. Kc3 Kb7 50. Kb4 Kc7 ½–½

=== Game 30: Euwe–Alekhine, ½–½ ===
1. d4 d5 2. c4 dxc4 3. Nf3 Nd7 4. Qa4 c6 5. Qxc4 Ngf6 6. g3 g6 7. Nc3 Bg7 8. Bg2 0-0 9. 0-0 Qa5 10. e4 Qh5 11. Qd3 Nb6 12. Ne2 Rd8 13. a4 Nbd7 14. b4 g5 15. Nxg5 Ne5 16. Qc2 Ng6 17. h3 h6 18. Bf3 Ng4 19. hxg4 Bxg4 20. Bxg4 Qxg4 21. Nxf7 Kxf7 22. Qc4+ e6 23. f3 Qh5 24. Be3 Rg8 25. Rf2 Bf6 26. Raf1 Nh4 27. Qxe6+ Kxe6 28. Nf4+ Kf7 29. Nxh5 Be7 30. Kh2 Ng6 31. Rb2 Rac8 32. f4 Nf8 33. f5 Bg5 34. Bxg5 Rxg5 35. Nf4 Nh7 36. Ne6 Rh5+ 37. Kg2 Nf6 38. Kf3 Rg8 39. Nf4 Rhg5 40. Rg1 ½–½
