= World Chess Championship 1948 =

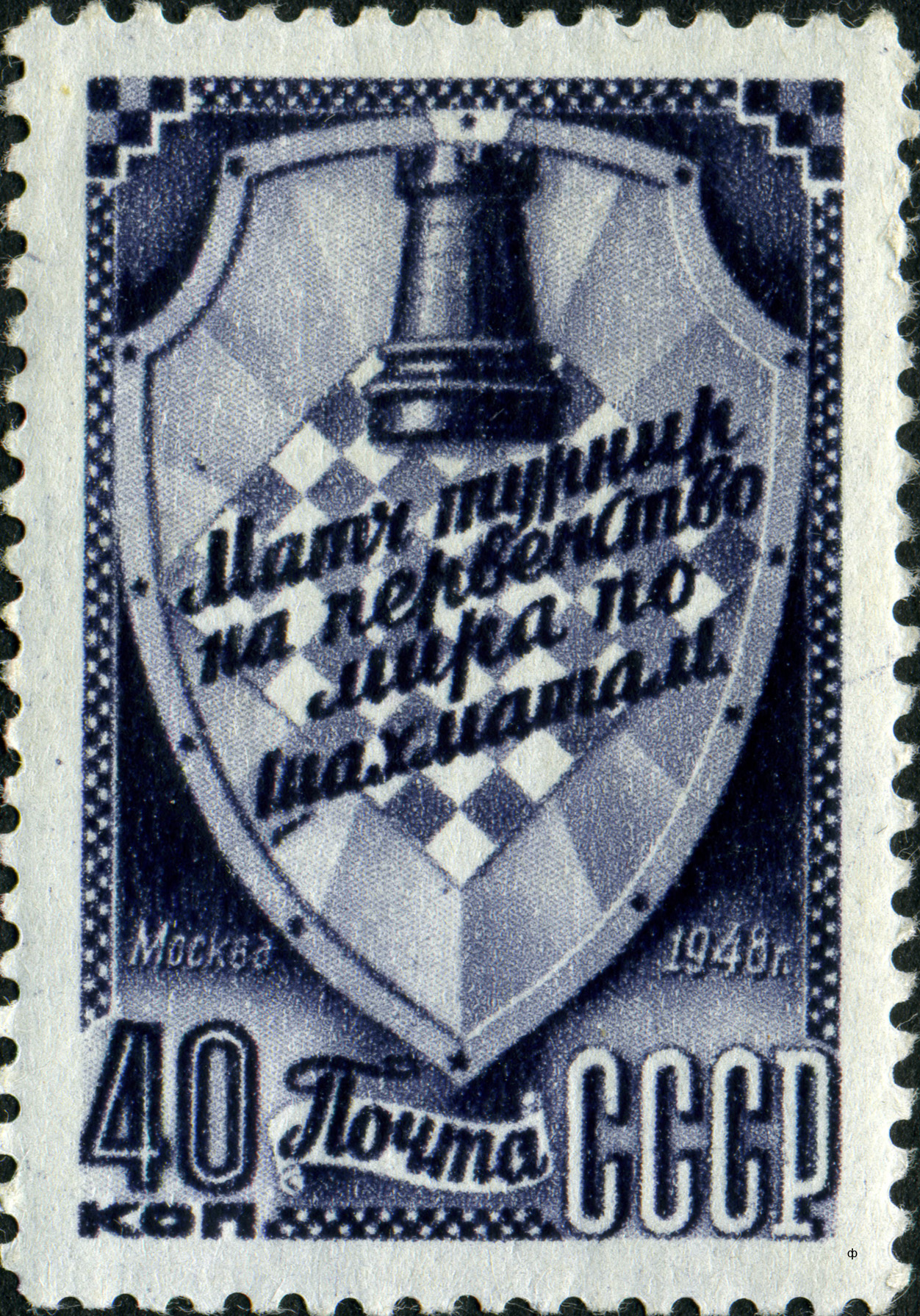
- USSR stamp marking the World Chess Championship
- Location: The Hague, Netherlands and Moscow, Soviet Union
- Dates: 2 March – 17 May 1948
- Competitors: 5 from 3 nations
- Winning score: 14 points of 20

Champion
- (Soviet Union) Mikhail Botvinnik

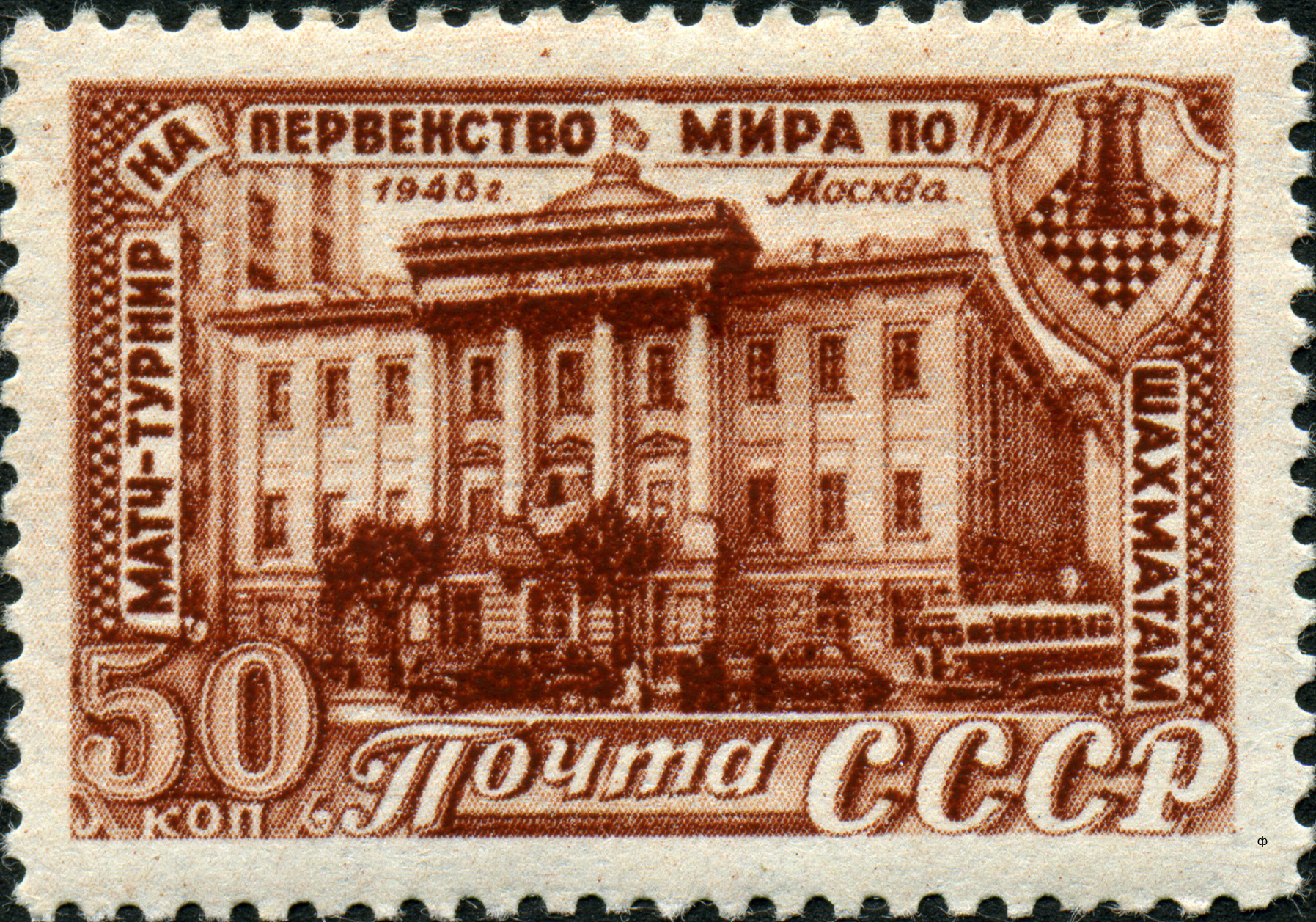
A Soviet stamp dedicated to the World Chess Championship 1948, showing the House of the Unions where it was held

The 1948 World Chess Championship was a quintuple round-robin tournament played to determine the new World Chess Champion following the death of the previous champion Alexander Alekhine in 1946. The tournament marked the passing of control of the championship title to FIDE, the International Chess Federation which had been formed in 1924. Mikhail Botvinnik won the five-player championship tournament, beginning the era of Soviet domination of international chess that would last over twenty years without interruption.

== Interregnum ==
Previously, a new World Champion had won the title by defeating the former champion in a match. Alekhine's death created an interregnum (gap between reigns) that made the normal procedure impossible. The situation was very confusing, with many respected players and commentators offering different solutions. FIDE found it very difficult to organise the early discussions on how to resolve the interregnum due to problems with money, communication and travel (for example, World War II prevented many countries from sending representatives – most notably the Soviet Union). The shortage of clear information resulted in otherwise responsible magazines publishing rumors and speculation, which only made the situation more baffling.

The eventual solution was very similar to FIDE's initial proposal and to a proposal put forward by the Soviet Union. The 1938 AVRO tournament was used as the basis for the 1948 Championship Tournament. The AVRO tournament had brought together the eight players who were, by general acclamation, the best players in the world at the time. Two of the participants at AVRO – Alekhine and former world champion José Raúl Capablanca – had died; but the July 1946 FIDE Congress at Winterthur, Switzerland decided that the five top placers at AVRO would play in a quadruple round robin tournament. These players were: ex-champion Max Euwe (from the Netherlands); Mikhail Botvinnik, Paul Keres and Vasily Smyslov (from the Soviet Union); and Reuben Fine and Samuel Reshevsky (from the US). Smyslov was the only non-AVRO player. In addition, the victor of a match between the winners of the Groningen and Prague tournaments would also qualify to the Championship Tournament. The tournament was scheduled to be held in the Netherlands in June 1947.

The selected participants met up at the end of the 1946 USA vs USSR match. As Fine could not be present, he was represented by Reshevsky. Botvinnik presented the terms for an agreement regarding the tournament. A gentleman's agreement was confirmed, in lieu of a signed agreement as the Soviet government had not yet agreed to the financial terms. The tournament fell apart after the government failed to backup the agreement. FIDE also gave up their initiative to host the Championship Tournament.

During the July–August 1947 FIDE Congress in The Hague, Netherlands, President Folke Rogard was due to announce two possible solutions. Either Euwe would be anointed World Champion or a Euwe–Reshevsky match would be held. However, the arrival of the Soviet delegates put the Championship Tournament back on the agenda again. The delegates announced that the monetary issues were resolved as well as their intention to join FIDE. The terms of the tournament were identical to the 1946 Congress proposal, except for the removal of the Prague–Groningen qualification route.

Reuben Fine elected not to play, for reasons which are not totally clear (see Reuben Fine § 1948 World Championship). There was a proposal that he should be replaced with Miguel Najdorf who had won at Prague, but in the end the tournament was played with only five players, and as a five-cycle round robin.

== Championship ==
Before the tournament, Botvinnik was considered the favourite because of his victory at Groningen 1946 and his pre-war results. Keres and Reshevsky were veterans of international competition. Although Euwe was the former world champion, he had played poorly since Groningen. Smyslov was not well known in the West, as he had only appeared in two international competitions: a third-place finish at Groningen and shared second at Warsaw 1947.

The Soviets brought a large contingent of about twenty-one including the players Botvinnik, Keres and Smyslov; their seconds Viacheslav Ragozin, Alexander Tolush and Vladimir Alatortsev, respectively; correspondents Igor Bondarevsky, Salo Flohr and Andor Lilienthal; member of the adjudication committee Alexander Kotov; leader of the group Postnikov; a private doctor from Moscow; and Botvinnik's wife and young daughter. The US delegation numbered one person—Reshevsky traveled alone and Lodewijk Prins was obtained at the last moment to be his second. Theo van Scheltinga served as Euwe's second.

The tournament was played partly in The Hague (from March 2–25) and partly in Moscow (from April 11 to May 17).

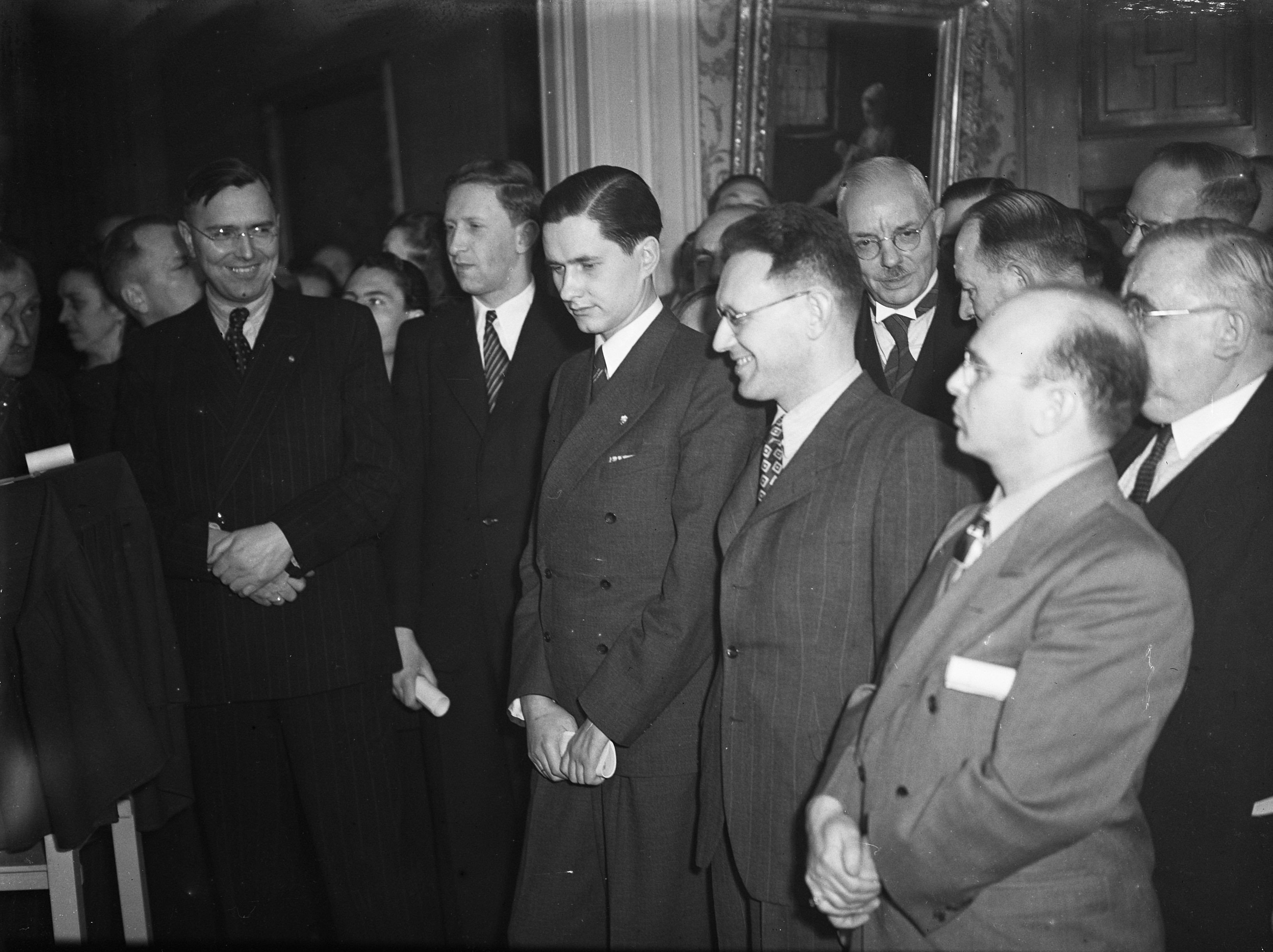
All five players: Euwe, Smyslov, Keres, Botvinnik and Reshevsky

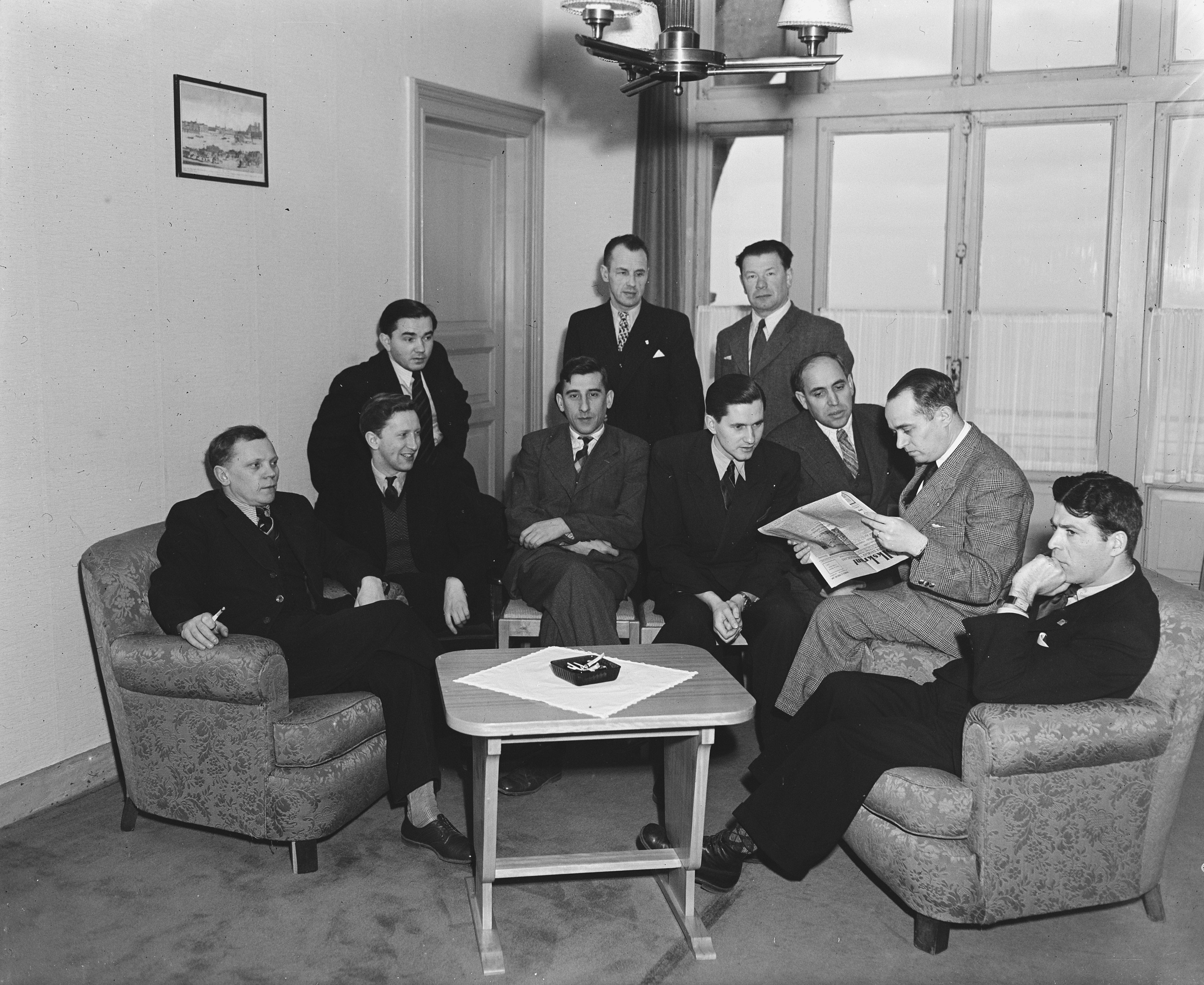
Soviet delegation

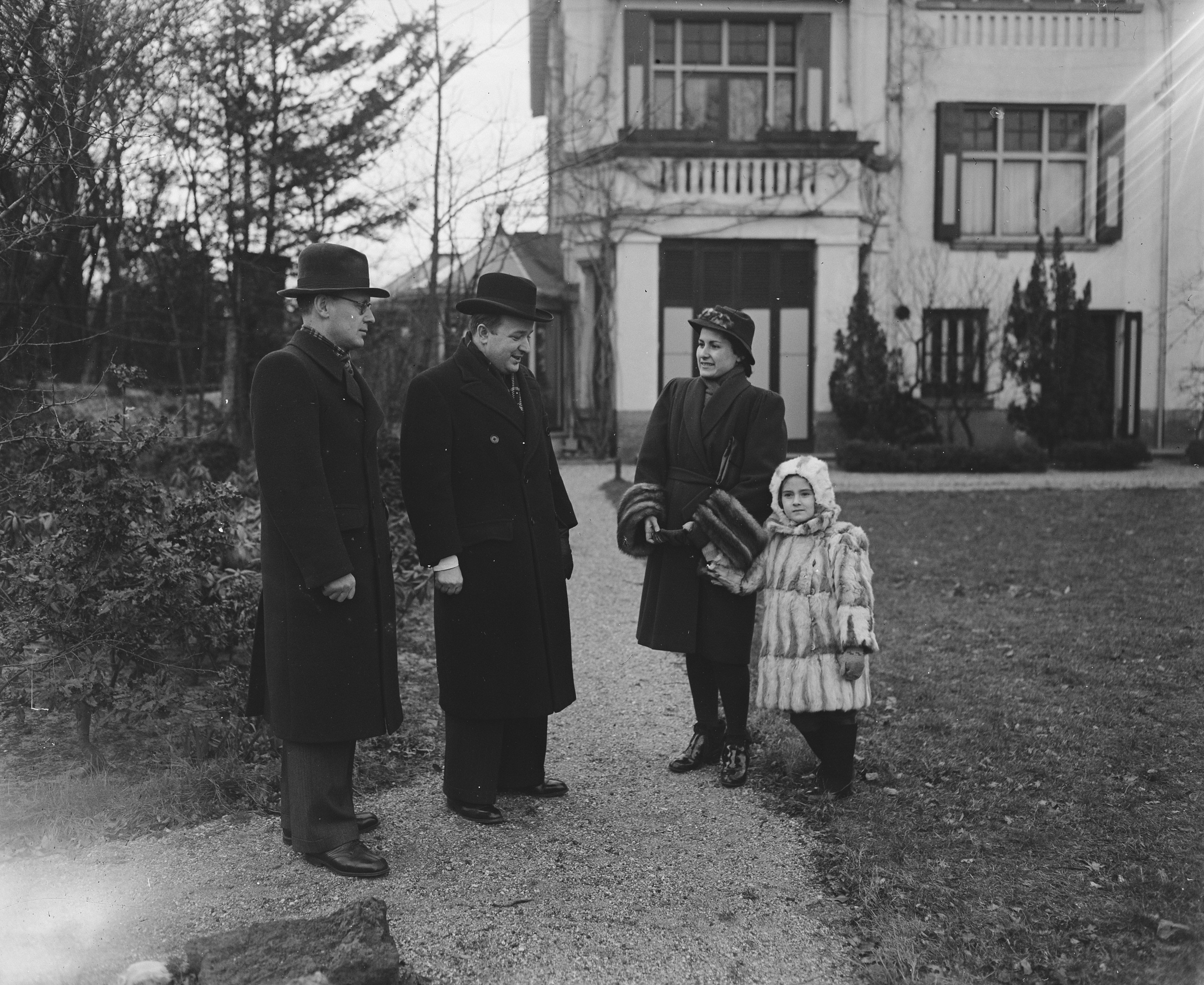
Botvinnik and Soviet ambassador Valkov

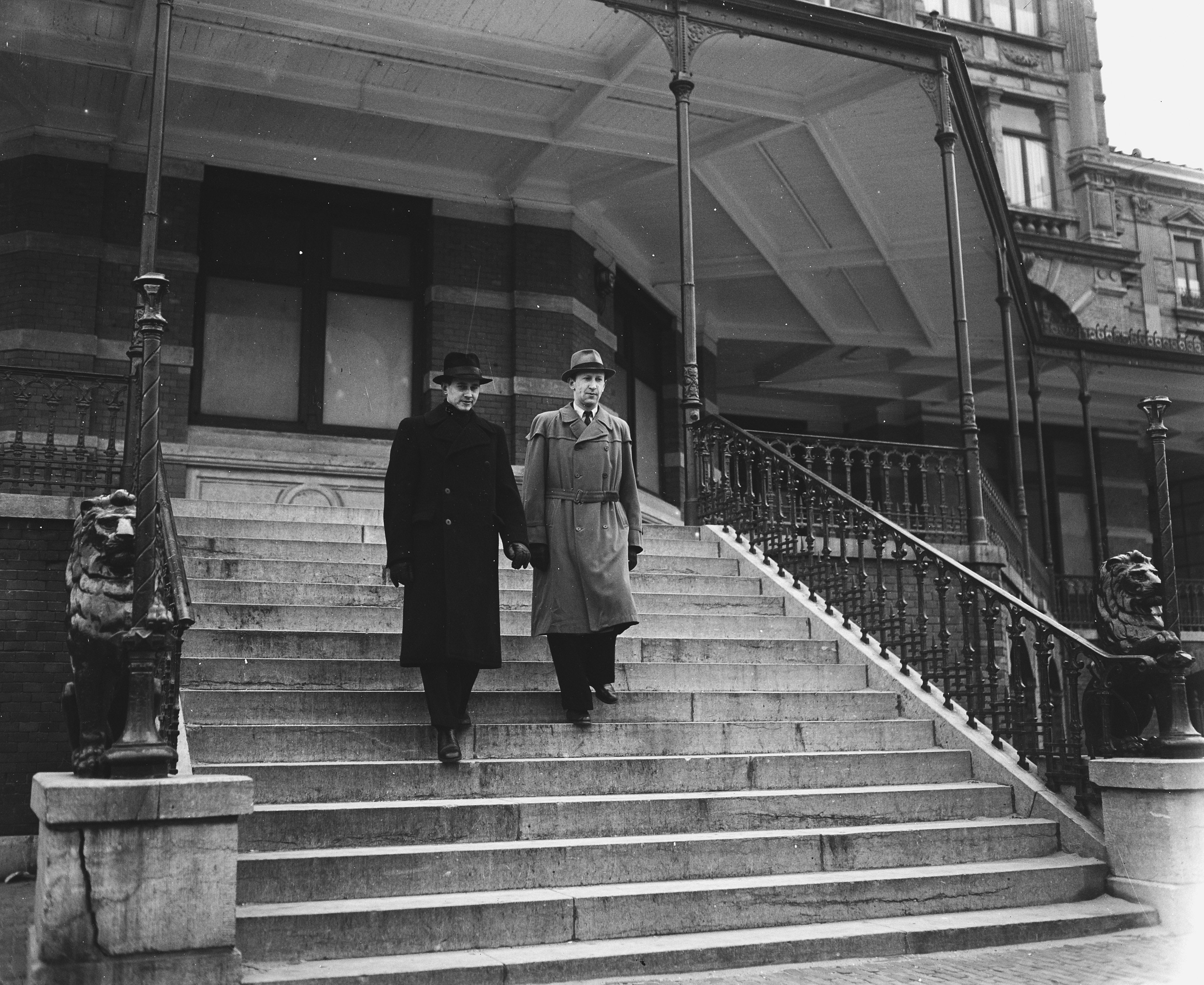
Keres and Smyslov at the Kurhaus Hotel

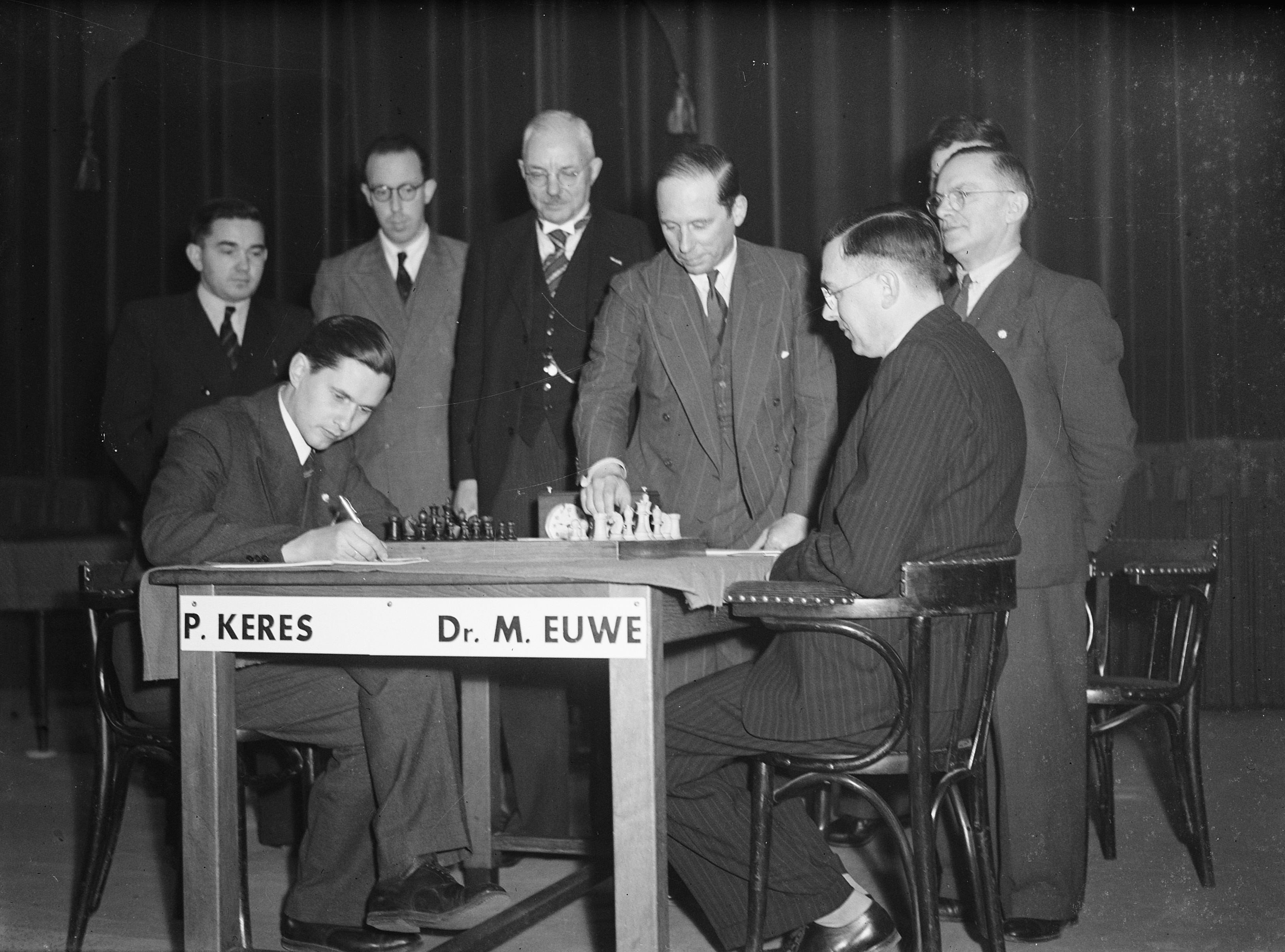
Keres vs. Euwe

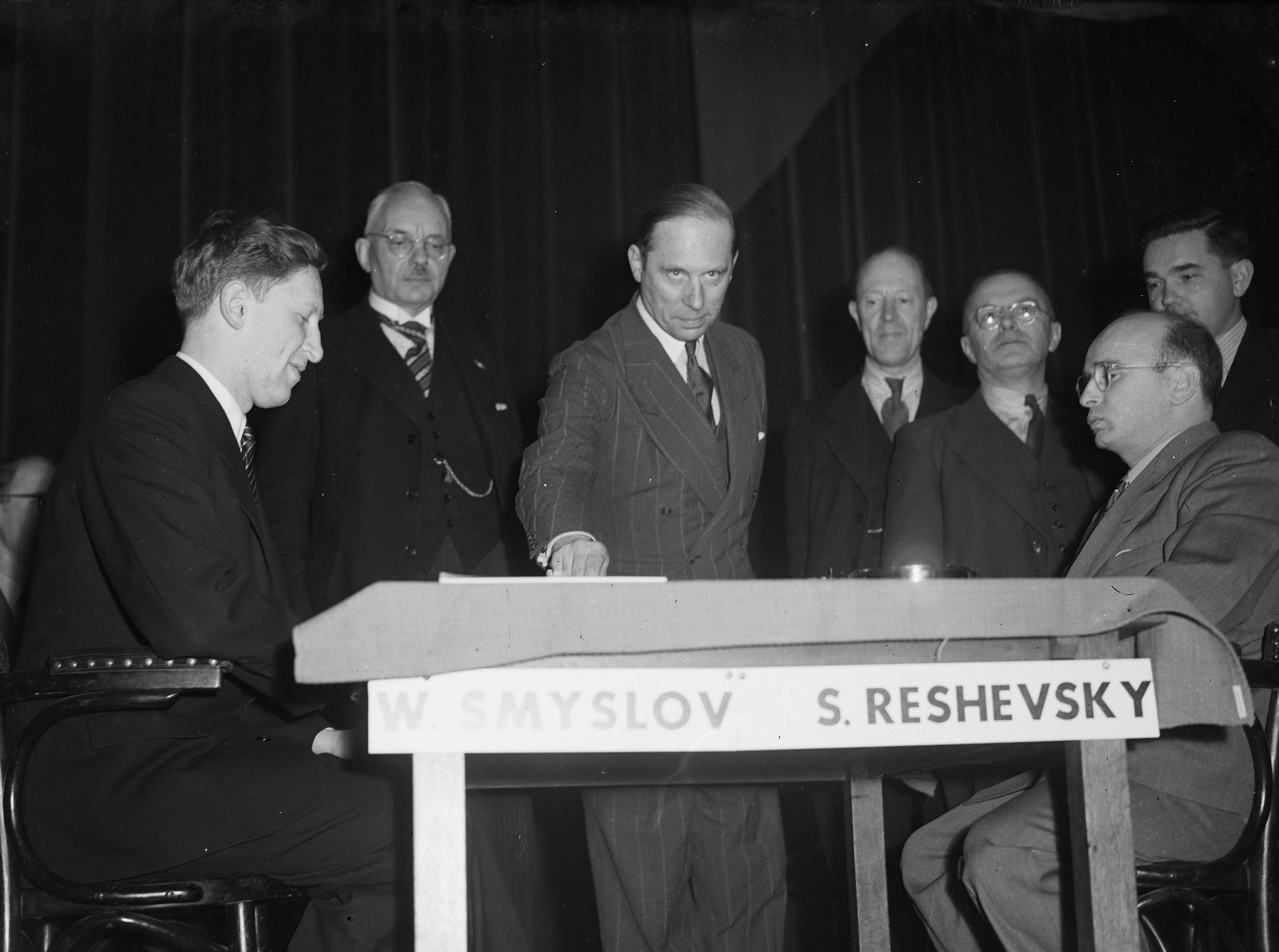
Smyslov vs. Reshevsky

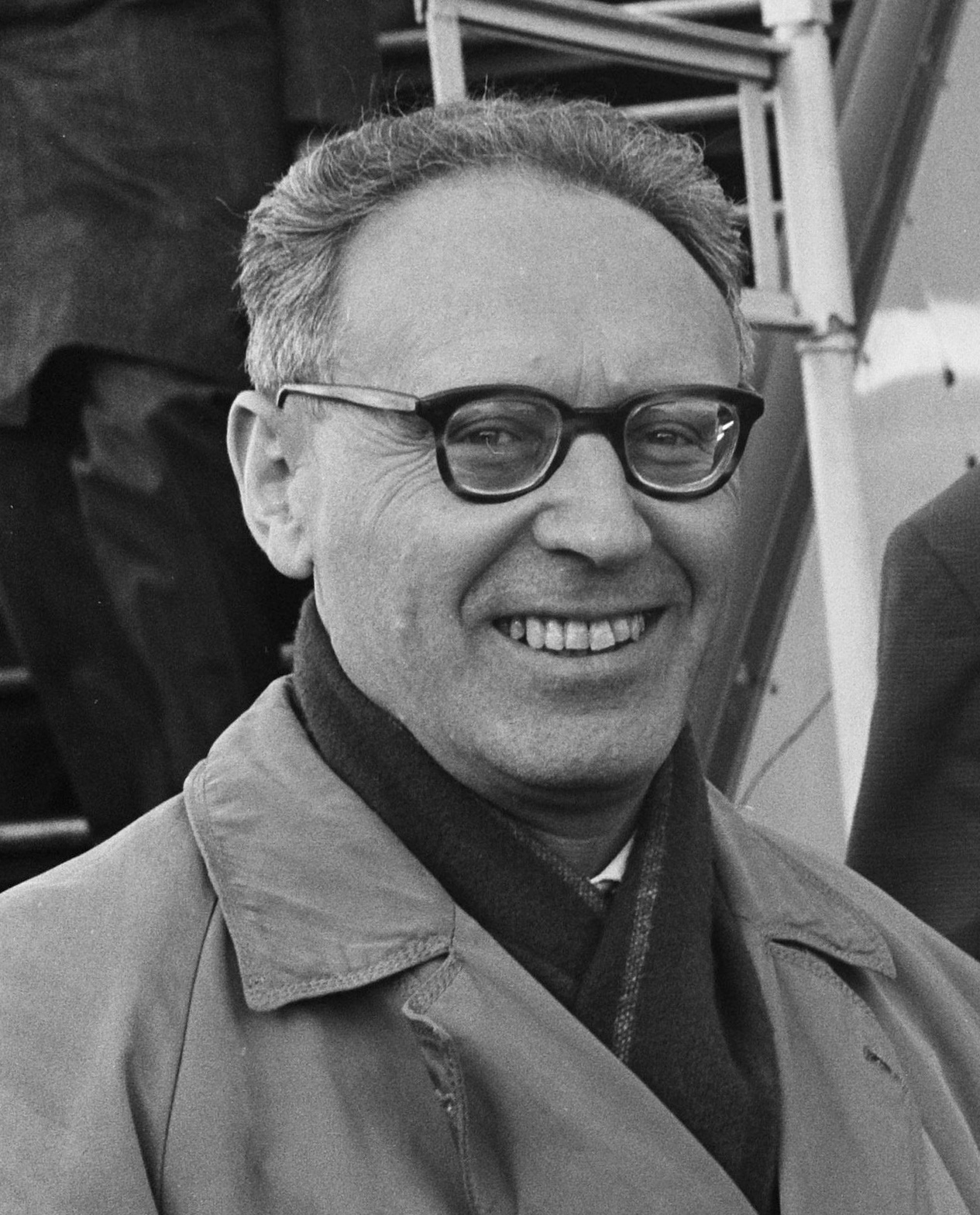
Mikhail Botvinnik, winner of the 1948 world championship

Botvinnik (36 years old) became the sixth World Chess Champion by winning the tournament convincingly with 14 points out of 20. He also had a plus score against all the other players. Smyslov came second with 11 points, just ahead of Keres and Reshevsky on 10½. Former champion Euwe was in bad form, and finished last with 4 out of 20.

=== Scores ===
Cumulative Scores by Leg (5 rounds)
Player	Rd 5	Rd 10	Rd 15	Rd 20	Rd 25
Mikhail Botvinnik (USSR)	3½	6	9	12	14
Vasily Smyslov (USSR)	2	4	5½	8½	11
Paul Keres (USSR)	2	4	6½	7½	10½
Samuel Reshevsky (USA)	2½	4½	6	8½	10½
Max Euwe (NED)	0	1½	3	3½	4

1948 FIDE World Championship Crosstable
Player	Botvinnik	Smyslov	Keres	Reshevsky	Euwe	Wins	Draws	Losses	Points
Mikhail Botvinnik (USSR)	–	½ ½ 1 ½ ½	1 1 1 1 0	1 ½ 0 1 1	1 ½ 1 ½ ½	10	8	2	14
Vasily Smyslov (USSR)	½ ½ 0 ½ ½	–	0 0 ½ 1 ½	½ ½ 1 ½ ½	1 1 0 1 1	6	10	4	11
Paul Keres (USSR)	0 0 0 0 1	1 1 ½ 0 ½	–	0 ½ 1 0 ½	1 ½ 1 1 1	8	5	7	10½
Samuel Reshevsky (USA)	0 ½ 1 0 0	½ ½ 0 ½ ½	1 ½ 0 1 ½	–	1 ½ ½ 1 1	6	9	5	10½
Max Euwe (NED)	0 ½ 0 ½ ½	0 0 1 0 0	0 ½ 0 0 0	0 ½ ½ 0 0	–	1	6	13	4

== Controversy ==
Since Keres lost his first four games against Botvinnik in the 1948 World Championship Tournament, and then won the fifth game only when Botvinnik was already settled as the winner of the tournament, suspicions are sometimes raised that Keres was forced to "throw" games to allow Botvinnik to win the Championship.

Chess historian Taylor Kingston investigated all the available evidence and arguments, and concluded that: Soviet chess officials gave Keres strong hints that he should not hinder Botvinnik's attempt to win the World Championship; Botvinnik only discovered this about halfway through the tournament and protested so strongly that he angered Soviet officials; and Keres probably did not deliberately lose games to Botvinnik or anyone else in the tournament. Kingston published a further article, after the publication of further evidence, which he summarizes in his third article. In a subsequent two-part interview with Kingston, Soviet grandmaster and official Yuri Averbakh said that: Stalin would not have given orders that Keres should lose to Botvinnik; Smyslov would probably have been the candidate most preferred by officials (he was a Russian Gentile while Botvinnik was Jewish, at a time of rising antisemitism among the Soviet elite); Keres was under severe psychological stress as a result of the multiple invasions of his home country, Estonia, and of his subsequent treatment by Soviet officials up to late 1946; and Keres was less tough mentally than his rivals.

Keres told Bent Larsen in private that the rumours were false and he lost fair and square to Botvinnik (J.Aagaard).
