= Han Hollander =

Dutch radio sports journalist

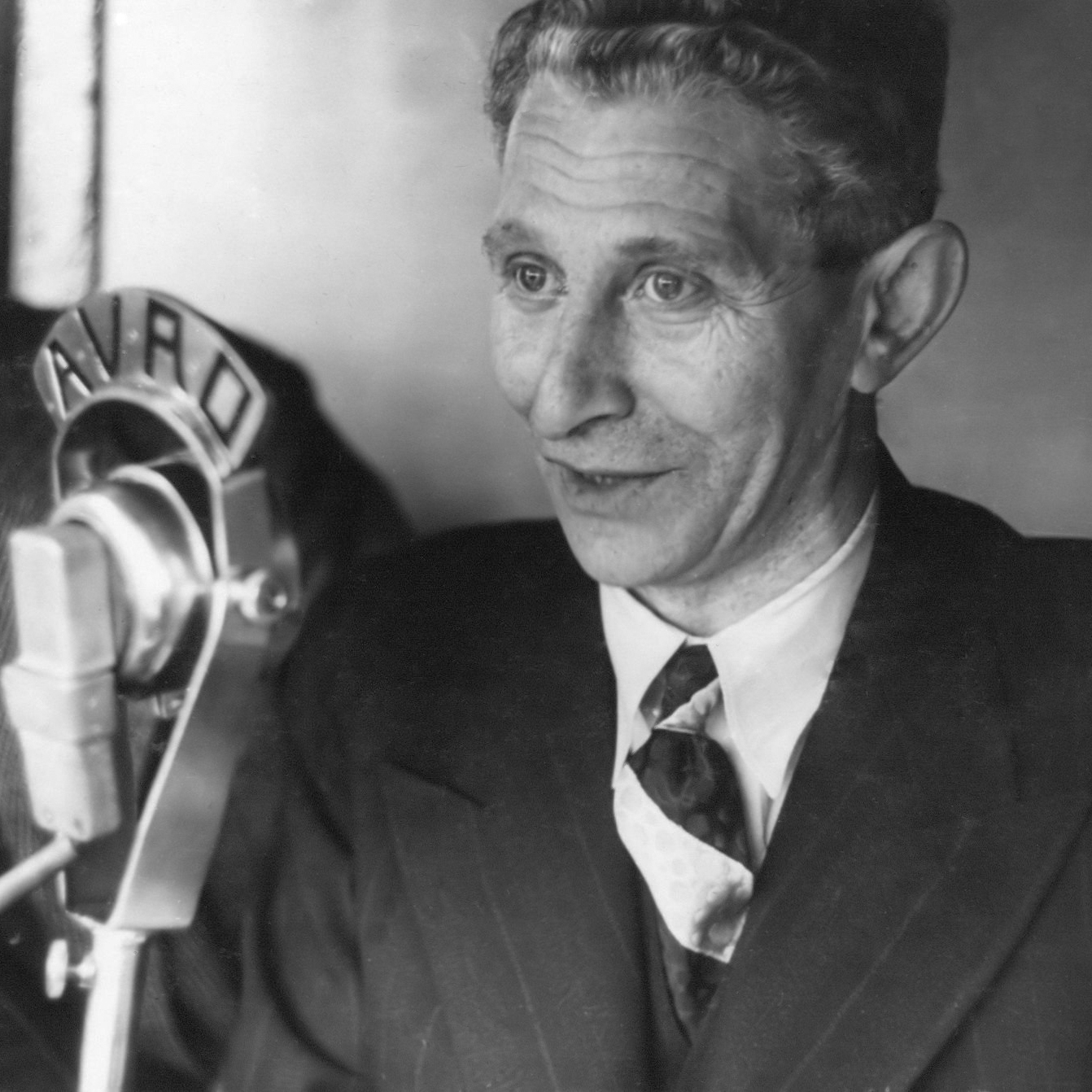
- Han Hollander in 1938
- Born: Hartog Hollander; 5 October 1886; Deventer, Netherlands
- Died: 9 July 1943 (aged 56); Sobibor extermination camp
- Occupation: Journalist

Hartog "Han" Hollander (5 October 1886 – 9 July 1943) was the first Dutch radio sports journalist. He was of Jewish origin.

== Publications ==
- Govert van Brakel: Han Hollander, de eerste radiostem van het Nederlandse voetbal. Amsterdam, Uitgeverij Balans, 2024. ISBN 9789463823845
