= Candidates Tournament =

International chess tournament

The Candidates Tournament (or in some periods Candidates Matches) is a chess tournament organized by FIDE, chess's international governing body, since 1950, as the final contest to determine the challenger for the World Chess Championship. The winner of the Candidates earns the right to a match for the World Championship against the incumbent world champion.

Before 1993 it was contested triennially; almost always held every third year from 1950 to 1992 inclusive. After the split of the World Championship in the early 1990s, the cycles were disrupted, even after the reunification of the titles in 2006. Since 2013 it has settled into a 2-year cycle: qualification for Candidates during the odd-numbered year, Candidates played early in the even-numbered year, and the World Championship match played late in the even-numbered year. The latter half of the 2020 Candidates Tournament was suspended due to the COVID-19 pandemic and was only played in April 2021. The subsequent tournament, the 2022 Candidates Tournament, took place as scheduled in 2022.

== Precursors ==
Before 1950, the champion had the right to handpick a challenger. However, a number of tournaments acted as de facto candidates tournaments:

- The London 1883 chess tournament established Johannes Zukertort and Wilhelm Steinitz as the best two players in the world, and was one of the important events leading to the first official world championship match between the two, in 1886. Steinitz won, making him the first official world champion.
- The Saint Petersburg 1895–96 chess tournament, in which world champion Emanuel Lasker finished first and Steinitz finished second, led to Steinitz gaining support for an 1897 rematch, which Lasker won.
- The AVRO 1938 chess tournament was held partly to choose a challenger for Alexander Alekhine. Paul Keres won on tie-breaks, but World War II prevented the match from happening.

== Organization ==
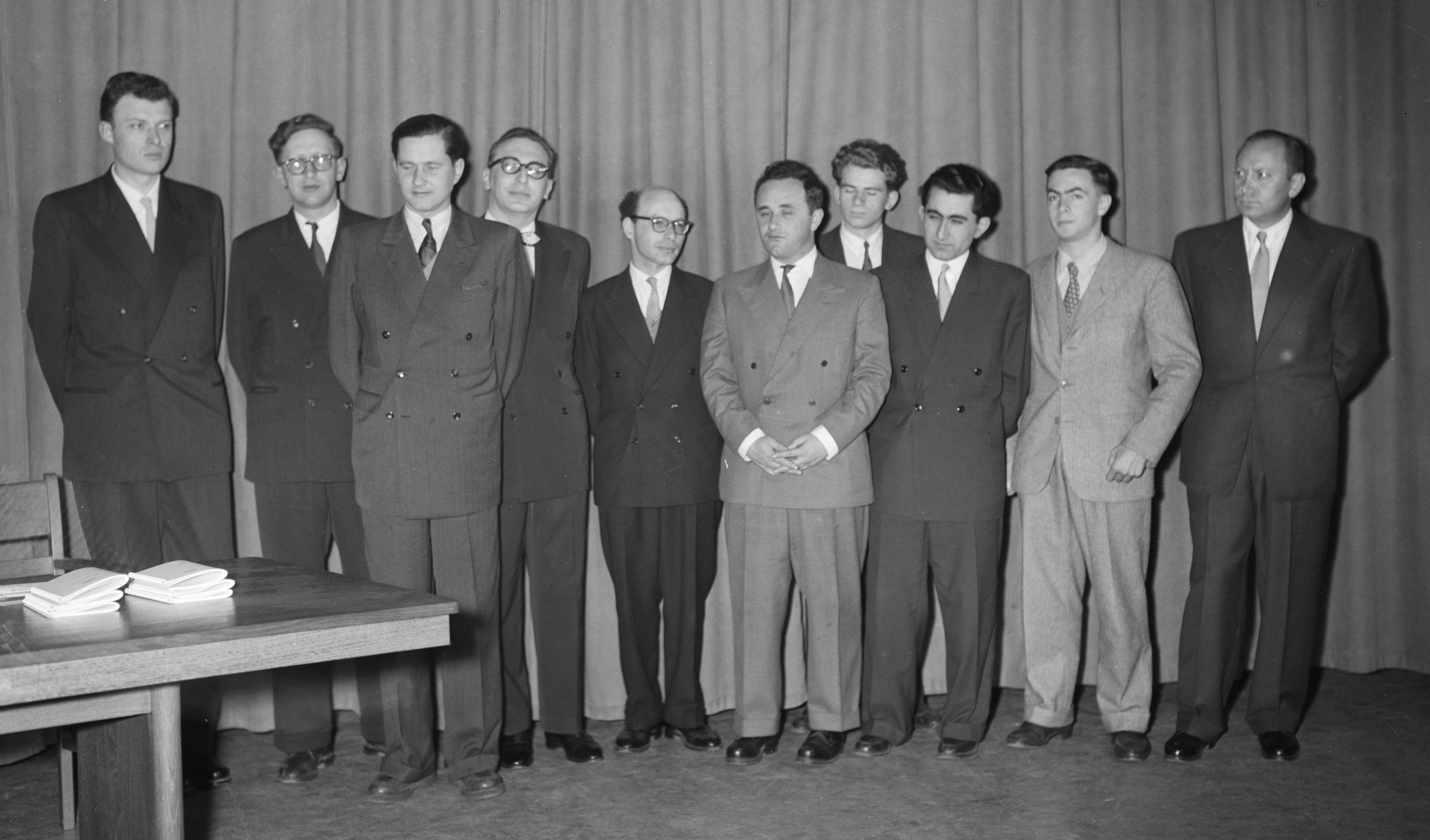
Candidates Tournament 1956 Amsterdam: 10 players

The number of players in the tournament varied over the years, between eight and fifteen players. Most of these qualified from Interzonal tournaments, though some gained direct entry without having to play the Interzonal.

The first Interzonal/Candidates World Championship cycle began in 1948. Before 1965, the tournament was organized in a round-robin format. From 1965 on, the tournament was played as knockout matches, spread over several months. In 1995–1996, the defending FIDE champion (Anatoly Karpov) also entered the Candidates, in the third round (Candidates final).

During its 1993 to 2006 split from FIDE, the "Classical" World Championship also held three Candidates Tournaments (in 1994–1995, 1998 and 2002) under a different sponsor and a different format each time. In one of these cases (Alexei Shirov in 1998) no title match eventuated, under disputed circumstances (see Classical World Chess Championship 2000).

After the reunification of titles in 2006, FIDE tried different Candidates formats in 2007, 2009 and 2011, before settling on an 8 player, double round robin Candidates tournament from 2013 onwards.

== Winners (since 2011) ==
Edition	Host city	Prize fund	Winner	Runner-up	Third
2011	Kazan, Russia	€ 500,000	(Israel) Boris Gelfand	(Russia) Alexander Grischuk	–
2013	London, England	€ 510,000	(Norway) Magnus Carlsen	(Russia) Vladimir Kramnik	(Russia) Peter Svidler
2014	Khanty-Mansiysk, Russia	€ 420,000	(India) Viswanathan Anand	(Russia) Sergey Karjakin	(Russia) Vladimir Kramnik
2016	Moscow, Russia	€ 420,000	(Russia) Sergey Karjakin	(United States) Fabiano Caruana	(India) Viswanathan Anand
2018	Berlin, Germany	€ 420,000	(United States) Fabiano Caruana	(Azerbaijan) Shakhriyar Mamedyarov	(Russia) Sergey Karjakin
2020–21	Yekaterinburg, Russia	€ 500,000	(Russia) Ian Nepomniachtchi	(France) Maxime Vachier-Lagrave	(Netherlands) Anish Giri
2022	Madrid, Spain	€ 500,000	(FIDE) Ian Nepomniachtchi	(China) Ding Liren	(Azerbaijan) Teimour Radjabov
2024	Toronto, Canada	€ 500,000	(India) Gukesh Dommaraju	(United States) Hikaru Nakamura	(FIDE) Ian Nepomniachtchi
2026	Pegeia, Cyprus	€ 700,000	(Uzbekistan) Javokhir Sindarov	(Netherlands) Anish Giri	(United States) Fabiano Caruana

== Results of Candidates Tournaments ==
The tables below show the qualifiers and results for all interzonal, Candidates and world championship tournaments.

- Players shown bracketed in italics (Bondarevsky, Euwe, Fine and Reshevsky in 1950, Botvinnik in 1965, Fischer in 1977, Carlsen in 2011 and 2024, and Radjabov in 2020) qualified for the Candidates or were seeded in the Candidates, but did not play.
- Players shown in italics with an asterisk (Stein* in 1962 and again in 1965, and Bronstein* in 1965) were excluded from the Candidates by a rule limiting the number of players from one country.
- Karjakin* in 2022 was disqualified by FIDE after his qualification for the Candidates: the FIDE Ethics and Disciplinary Commission ruled that he breached Article 2.2.10 of the FIDE Code of Ethics after he made public comments approving of the 2022 Russian invasion of Ukraine. He is shown bracketed, in italics, and with an asterisk.
- Players listed after players in italics (Flohr in 1950, Benko in 1962, Geller, Ivkov and Portisch in 1965, Spassky in 1977, Grischuk in 2011, Vachier-Lagrave in 2020, Ding in 2022, and Abasov in 2024) only qualified due to the non-participation (withdrawal) of the bracketed players or players with an asterisk.
- Incumbent champions' names are struck through when they refused to defend their title (Fischer in 1975 and Carlsen in 2023).

Normally, the incumbent champion is seeded directly into the final against the challenger (who had to pass through the Candidates qualification), but there have been exceptions:

- The World Chess Championship 1948, in which five players were seeded into the championship tournament (the previous champion, Alexander Alekhine, having died in 1946). A sixth player, Fine, was also seeded into the championship tournament but chose not to play; he is shown in brackets.
- The FIDE World Chess Championship 1996, in which the FIDE World Champion Anatoly Karpov was seeded in the Candidates final.
- The Classical World Chess Championship 2000, in which two players were seeded into the championship final (one of them being incumbent champion Kasparov), and there were no previous qualifying stages. In this way, it resembled the pre-1946 events, in which the champion could handpick a challenger.
- The FIDE championships of 1999–2004 (during the split-title period), in which the incumbent champion had no special privileges.
- The FIDE World Chess Championship 2005, in which eight players (including incumbent FIDE champion Kasimdzhanov) were seeded into the final championship tournament.
- The FIDE World Chess Championship 2007, in which four players (including incumbent champion Kramnik) were seeded into the final championship tournament.

The incumbent champion Bobby Fischer refused to defend his title at the World Chess Championship 1975, and his challenger Anatoly Karpov won by forfeit. (At the time, the Candidates was a knock-out event, so the 1974 Karpov–Korchnoi Candidates final match – a best of 24 games, like world championships in the period 1951–1972 and 1985–1993 – arguably became a de facto world championship in retrospect.) Magnus Carlsen refused to defend his title at the World Chess Championship 2023 and was replaced by the runner-up of the Candidates Tournament, Ding Liren.

== Interzonal and Candidates tournaments (1948–1996) ==
World Championship selection cycles from 1948 to 1996
Year	Selection of participants			Championship	
1948	1938 AVRO winners	(Soviet Union) Paul Keres; ~~(United States) Reuben Fine~~		The Hague/Moscow 1948; Quintuple round robin: 1 (Soviet Union) Botvinnik 14/20; 2 (Soviet Union) Smyslov 11; 3-4 (Soviet Union) Keres 10½; 3-4 (United States) Reshevsky 10½; 5 (Netherlands) Euwe 4	
1948	Multiple US Champion	(United States) Samuel Reshevsky		The Hague/Moscow 1948; Quintuple round robin: 1 (Soviet Union) Botvinnik 14/20; 2 (Soviet Union) Smyslov 11; 3-4 (Soviet Union) Keres 10½; 3-4 (United States) Reshevsky 10½; 5 (Netherlands) Euwe 4	
1948	Former World Champion	(Netherlands) Max Euwe		The Hague/Moscow 1948; Quintuple round robin: 1 (Soviet Union) Botvinnik 14/20; 2 (Soviet Union) Smyslov 11; 3-4 (Soviet Union) Keres 10½; 3-4 (United States) Reshevsky 10½; 5 (Netherlands) Euwe 4	
1948	Soviet Champion	(Soviet Union) Mikhail Botvinnik		The Hague/Moscow 1948; Quintuple round robin: 1 (Soviet Union) Botvinnik 14/20; 2 (Soviet Union) Smyslov 11; 3-4 (Soviet Union) Keres 10½; 3-4 (United States) Reshevsky 10½; 5 (Netherlands) Euwe 4	
1948	Soviet grandmaster	(Soviet Union) Vasily Smyslov		The Hague/Moscow 1948; Quintuple round robin: 1 (Soviet Union) Botvinnik 14/20; 2 (Soviet Union) Smyslov 11; 3-4 (Soviet Union) Keres 10½; 3-4 (United States) Reshevsky 10½; 5 (Netherlands) Euwe 4	
Year	Interzonal tournaments		Candidates tournaments		Championship
Year	Format	Qualifiers	Results	Contestants	Results
1948–51	1948 participants	(Soviet Union) Smyslov (Soviet Union) Keres; ~~(Netherlands) Euwe~~; ~~(United States) Fine~~; ~~(United States) Reshevsky~~	Budapest 1950; Double round robin 10 players 1-2 (Soviet Union) Boleslavsky; 1-2 (Soviet Union) Bronstein; 3 (Soviet Union) Smyslov; 4 (Soviet Union) Keres Playoff: (Soviet Union) Bronstein beat (Soviet Union) Boleslavsky	Candidates winner: (Soviet Union) Bronstein Defending champion: (Soviet Union) Botvinnik	Moscow 1951; 24-game match Drawn 12–12 (Soviet Union) Botvinnik retained title
1948–51	Saltsjöbaden (Stockholm) 1948: Single round robin 20 players 8 qualified	1 (Soviet Union) Bronstein; 2 (Hungary) Szabo; 3 (Soviet Union) Boleslavsky; 4 (Soviet Union) Kotov; 5 (Soviet Union) Lilienthal; 6-9 (Argentina) Najdorf; 6-9 (Sweden) Ståhlberg; 6-9 ~~(Soviet Union) Bondarevsky~~; 6-9 (Czech Republic) Flohr	Budapest 1950; Double round robin 10 players 1-2 (Soviet Union) Boleslavsky; 1-2 (Soviet Union) Bronstein; 3 (Soviet Union) Smyslov; 4 (Soviet Union) Keres Playoff: (Soviet Union) Bronstein beat (Soviet Union) Boleslavsky	Candidates winner: (Soviet Union) Bronstein Defending champion: (Soviet Union) Botvinnik	Moscow 1951; 24-game match Drawn 12–12 (Soviet Union) Botvinnik retained title
1952–54	1951 runner up	(Soviet Union) Bronstein	Zürich 1953; Double round robin 15 players 1 (Soviet Union) Smyslov; 2-4 (Soviet Union) Bronstein; 2-4 (Soviet Union) Keres; 2-4 (United States) Reshevsky	Candidates winner: (Soviet Union) Smyslov Defending champion: (Soviet Union) Botvinnik	Moscow 1954; 24-game match Drawn 12–12 (Soviet Union) Botvinnik retained title
1952–54	Candidates 2nd-5th	(Soviet Union) Boleslavsky (Soviet Union) Smyslov (Soviet Union) Keres (Argentina) Najdorf	Zürich 1953; Double round robin 15 players 1 (Soviet Union) Smyslov; 2-4 (Soviet Union) Bronstein; 2-4 (Soviet Union) Keres; 2-4 (United States) Reshevsky	Candidates winner: (Soviet Union) Smyslov Defending champion: (Soviet Union) Botvinnik	Moscow 1954; 24-game match Drawn 12–12 (Soviet Union) Botvinnik retained title
1952–54	1948 participants	(United States) Reshevsky (Netherlands) Euwe	Zürich 1953; Double round robin 15 players 1 (Soviet Union) Smyslov; 2-4 (Soviet Union) Bronstein; 2-4 (Soviet Union) Keres; 2-4 (United States) Reshevsky	Candidates winner: (Soviet Union) Smyslov Defending champion: (Soviet Union) Botvinnik	Moscow 1954; 24-game match Drawn 12–12 (Soviet Union) Botvinnik retained title
1952–54	Saltsjöbaden (Stockholm) 1952; Single round robin 21 players 8 qualified	1 (Soviet Union) Kotov; 2-3 (Soviet Union) Taimanov; 2-3 (Soviet Union) Petrosian; 4 (Soviet Union) Geller; 5-8 (Soviet Union) Averbakh; 5-8 (Sweden) Ståhlberg; 5-8 (Hungary) Szabo; 5-8 (Socialist Federal Republic of Yugoslavia) Gligorić	Zürich 1953; Double round robin 15 players 1 (Soviet Union) Smyslov; 2-4 (Soviet Union) Bronstein; 2-4 (Soviet Union) Keres; 2-4 (United States) Reshevsky	Candidates winner: (Soviet Union) Smyslov Defending champion: (Soviet Union) Botvinnik	Moscow 1954; 24-game match Drawn 12–12 (Soviet Union) Botvinnik retained title
1955–57	1954 runner up	(Soviet Union) Smyslov	Amsterdam 1956; Double round robin 10 players 1 (Soviet Union) Smyslov; 2 (Soviet Union) Keres	Candidates winner: (Soviet Union) Smyslov Defending champion: (Soviet Union) Botvinnik	Moscow 1957; 24-game match (Soviet Union) Smyslov won 12½–9½
1955–57	Gothenburg 1955; Single round robin 21 players 9 qualified	1 (Soviet Union) Bronstein; 2 (Soviet Union) Keres; 3 (Argentina) Panno; 4 (Soviet Union) Petrosian; 5-6 (Soviet Union) Geller; 5-6 (Hungary) Szabo; 7–9 (Czech Republic) Filip; 7–9 (Argentina) Pilnik; 7–9 (Soviet Union) Spassky	Amsterdam 1956; Double round robin 10 players 1 (Soviet Union) Smyslov; 2 (Soviet Union) Keres	Candidates winner: (Soviet Union) Smyslov Defending champion: (Soviet Union) Botvinnik	Moscow 1957; 24-game match (Soviet Union) Smyslov won 12½–9½
1958	Rematch			(Soviet Union) Botvinnik (Soviet Union) Smyslov	Moscow 1958; 24-game match (Soviet Union) Botvinnik won 12½–10½
1958–60	1958 runner up	(Soviet Union) Smyslov	Yugoslavia 1959; Quadruple round robin 8 players 1 (Soviet Union) Tal; 2 (Soviet Union) Keres; 3 (Soviet Union) Petrosian; 4 (Soviet Union) Smyslov	Candidates winner: (Soviet Union) Tal Defending champion: (Soviet Union) Botvinnik	Moscow 1960; 24-game match (Soviet Union) Tal won 12½–8½
1958–60	1956 Candidates runner up	(Soviet Union) Keres	Yugoslavia 1959; Quadruple round robin 8 players 1 (Soviet Union) Tal; 2 (Soviet Union) Keres; 3 (Soviet Union) Petrosian; 4 (Soviet Union) Smyslov	Candidates winner: (Soviet Union) Tal Defending champion: (Soviet Union) Botvinnik	Moscow 1960; 24-game match (Soviet Union) Tal won 12½–8½
1958–60	Portorož 1958; Single round robin 21 players 6 qualified	1 (Soviet Union) Tal; 2 (Socialist Federal Republic of Yugoslavia) Gligorić; 3-4 (Soviet Union) Petrosian; 3-4 (Hungary) Benko; 5-6 (Iceland) Friðrik; 5-6 (United States) Fischer	Yugoslavia 1959; Quadruple round robin 8 players 1 (Soviet Union) Tal; 2 (Soviet Union) Keres; 3 (Soviet Union) Petrosian; 4 (Soviet Union) Smyslov	Candidates winner: (Soviet Union) Tal Defending champion: (Soviet Union) Botvinnik	Moscow 1960; 24-game match (Soviet Union) Tal won 12½–8½
1961	Rematch			(Soviet Union) Botvinnik (Soviet Union) Tal	Moscow 1961; 24-game match (Soviet Union) Botvinnik won 13–8
1962–63	1961 runner up	(Soviet Union) Tal	Curaçao 1962; Quadruple round robin 8 players 1 (Soviet Union) Petrosian; 2 (Soviet Union) Keres; 3 (Soviet Union) Geller; 4 (United States) Fischer	Candidates winner: (Soviet Union) Petrosian Defending champion: (Soviet Union) Botvinnik	Moscow 1963; 24-game match (Soviet Union) Petrosian won 12½–9½
1962–63	1959 Candidates runner up	(Soviet Union) Keres	Curaçao 1962; Quadruple round robin 8 players 1 (Soviet Union) Petrosian; 2 (Soviet Union) Keres; 3 (Soviet Union) Geller; 4 (United States) Fischer	Candidates winner: (Soviet Union) Petrosian Defending champion: (Soviet Union) Botvinnik	Moscow 1963; 24-game match (Soviet Union) Petrosian won 12½–9½
1962–63	Stockholm 1962; Single round robin 23 players 6 qualified	1 (United States) Fischer; 2-3 (Soviet Union) Geller; 2-3 (Soviet Union) Petrosian; 4-5 (Soviet Union) Korchnoi; 4-5 (Czech Republic) Filip; 6-8 (Soviet Union) Stein*; 6-8 (Hungary) Benko	Curaçao 1962; Quadruple round robin 8 players 1 (Soviet Union) Petrosian; 2 (Soviet Union) Keres; 3 (Soviet Union) Geller; 4 (United States) Fischer	Candidates winner: (Soviet Union) Petrosian Defending champion: (Soviet Union) Botvinnik	Moscow 1963; 24-game match (Soviet Union) Petrosian won 12½–9½
1964–66	1963 runner up	~~(Soviet Union) Botvinnik~~	1965: 8 players, matches Semi-finals: (Soviet Union) Spassky beat (Soviet Union) Geller (Soviet Union) Tal beat (Denmark) Larsen Final: (Soviet Union) Spassky beat (Soviet Union) Tal	Candidates winner: (Soviet Union) Spassky Defending champion: (Soviet Union) Petrosian	Moscow 1966; 24-game match (Soviet Union) Petrosian won 12½–11½
1964–66	1962 Candidates	(Soviet Union) Keres (Soviet Union) Geller	1965: 8 players, matches Semi-finals: (Soviet Union) Spassky beat (Soviet Union) Geller (Soviet Union) Tal beat (Denmark) Larsen Final: (Soviet Union) Spassky beat (Soviet Union) Tal	Candidates winner: (Soviet Union) Spassky Defending champion: (Soviet Union) Petrosian	Moscow 1966; 24-game match (Soviet Union) Petrosian won 12½–11½
1964–66	Amsterdam 1964; Single round robin 24 players 6 qualified	1-4 (Soviet Union) Smyslov; 1-4 (Denmark) Larsen; 1-4 (Soviet Union) Spassky; 1-4 (Soviet Union) Tal; 5 (Soviet Union) Stein*; 6 (Soviet Union) Bronstein*; 7 (Socialist Federal Republic of Yugoslavia) Ivkov; 8-9 (Hungary) Portisch	1965: 8 players, matches Semi-finals: (Soviet Union) Spassky beat (Soviet Union) Geller (Soviet Union) Tal beat (Denmark) Larsen Final: (Soviet Union) Spassky beat (Soviet Union) Tal	Candidates winner: (Soviet Union) Spassky Defending champion: (Soviet Union) Petrosian	Moscow 1966; 24-game match (Soviet Union) Petrosian won 12½–11½
1967–69	1966 runner up	(Soviet Union) Spassky	1968: 8 players, matches Semi-finals: (Soviet Union) Korchnoi beat (Soviet Union) Tal (Soviet Union) Spassky beat (Denmark) Larsen Final: (Soviet Union) Spassky beat (Soviet Union) Korchnoi	Candidates winner: (Soviet Union) Spassky Defending champion: (Soviet Union) Petrosian	Moscow 1969; 24-game match (Soviet Union) Spassky won 12½–10½
1967–69	1965 Candidates runner up	(Soviet Union) Tal	1968: 8 players, matches Semi-finals: (Soviet Union) Korchnoi beat (Soviet Union) Tal (Soviet Union) Spassky beat (Denmark) Larsen Final: (Soviet Union) Spassky beat (Soviet Union) Korchnoi	Candidates winner: (Soviet Union) Spassky Defending champion: (Soviet Union) Petrosian	Moscow 1969; 24-game match (Soviet Union) Spassky won 12½–10½
1967–69	Sousse 1967; Single round robin 23 players 6 qualified	1 (Denmark) Larsen; 2-4 (Soviet Union) Korchnoi; 2-4 (Soviet Union) Geller; 2-4 (Socialist Federal Republic of Yugoslavia) Gligorić; 5 (Hungary) Portisch; 6-8 (United States) Reshevsky	1968: 8 players, matches Semi-finals: (Soviet Union) Korchnoi beat (Soviet Union) Tal (Soviet Union) Spassky beat (Denmark) Larsen Final: (Soviet Union) Spassky beat (Soviet Union) Korchnoi	Candidates winner: (Soviet Union) Spassky Defending champion: (Soviet Union) Petrosian	Moscow 1969; 24-game match (Soviet Union) Spassky won 12½–10½
1970–72	1969 runner up	(Soviet Union) Petrosian	1971: 8 players, matches Semi-finals: (Soviet Union) Petrosian beat (Soviet Union) Korchnoi (United States) Fischer beat (Denmark) Larsen Final: (United States) Fischer beat (Soviet Union) Petrosian	Candidates winner: (United States) Fischer Defending champion: (Soviet Union) Spassky	Reykjavík 1972; 24-game match (United States) Fischer won 12½–8½
1970–72	1968 Candidates runner up	(Soviet Union) Korchnoi	1971: 8 players, matches Semi-finals: (Soviet Union) Petrosian beat (Soviet Union) Korchnoi (United States) Fischer beat (Denmark) Larsen Final: (United States) Fischer beat (Soviet Union) Petrosian	Candidates winner: (United States) Fischer Defending champion: (Soviet Union) Spassky	Reykjavík 1972; 24-game match (United States) Fischer won 12½–8½
1970–72	Palma de Mallorca 1970; Single round robin 24 players 6 qualified	1 (United States) Fischer; 2-4 (Denmark) Larsen; 2-4 (Soviet Union) Geller; 2-4 (West Germany) Hübner; 5-6 (Soviet Union) Taimanov; 5-6 (East Germany) Uhlmann	1971: 8 players, matches Semi-finals: (Soviet Union) Petrosian beat (Soviet Union) Korchnoi (United States) Fischer beat (Denmark) Larsen Final: (United States) Fischer beat (Soviet Union) Petrosian	Candidates winner: (United States) Fischer Defending champion: (Soviet Union) Spassky	Reykjavík 1972; 24-game match (United States) Fischer won 12½–8½
1973–75	1972 runner up	(Soviet Union) Spassky	1974: 8 players, matches Semi-finals: (Soviet Union) Korchnoi beat (Soviet Union) Petrosian (Soviet Union) Karpov beat (Soviet Union) Spassky Final: (Soviet Union) Karpov beat (Soviet Union) Korchnoi	Candidates winner: (Soviet Union) Karpov Defending champion: ~~(United States) Fischer~~	1975: (Soviet Union) Karpov won on forfeit
1973–75	1971 Candidates runner up	(Soviet Union) Petrosian	1974: 8 players, matches Semi-finals: (Soviet Union) Korchnoi beat (Soviet Union) Petrosian (Soviet Union) Karpov beat (Soviet Union) Spassky Final: (Soviet Union) Karpov beat (Soviet Union) Korchnoi	Candidates winner: (Soviet Union) Karpov Defending champion: ~~(United States) Fischer~~	1975: (Soviet Union) Karpov won on forfeit
1973–75	1973: Two single round robins 18 players each 3 qualified from each	Leningrad 1973: 1-2 (Soviet Union) Korchnoi; 1-2 (Soviet Union) Karpov; 3 (United States) Byrne	1974: 8 players, matches Semi-finals: (Soviet Union) Korchnoi beat (Soviet Union) Petrosian (Soviet Union) Karpov beat (Soviet Union) Spassky Final: (Soviet Union) Karpov beat (Soviet Union) Korchnoi	Candidates winner: (Soviet Union) Karpov Defending champion: ~~(United States) Fischer~~	1975: (Soviet Union) Karpov won on forfeit
1973–75	1973: Two single round robins 18 players each 3 qualified from each	Petropolis 1973: 1 (Brazil) Mecking; 2-4 (Hungary) Portisch; 2-4 (Soviet Union) Polugaevsky	1974: 8 players, matches Semi-finals: (Soviet Union) Korchnoi beat (Soviet Union) Petrosian (Soviet Union) Karpov beat (Soviet Union) Spassky Final: (Soviet Union) Karpov beat (Soviet Union) Korchnoi	Candidates winner: (Soviet Union) Karpov Defending champion: ~~(United States) Fischer~~	1975: (Soviet Union) Karpov won on forfeit
1976–78	1975 runner up	~~(United States) Fischer~~	1977: 8 players, matches Semi-finals: (Switzerland) Korchnoi beat (Soviet Union) Polugaevsky (Soviet Union) Spassky beat (Hungary) Portisch Final: (Switzerland) Korchnoi beat (Soviet Union) Spassky	Candidates winner: (Switzerland) Korchnoi Defending champion: (Soviet Union) Karpov	Baguio 1978; First to 6 wins (Soviet Union) Karpov won 6–5 after 32 games (draws not counting)
1976–78	1974 Candidates	(Switzerland) Korchnoi (Soviet Union) Spassky	1977: 8 players, matches Semi-finals: (Switzerland) Korchnoi beat (Soviet Union) Polugaevsky (Soviet Union) Spassky beat (Hungary) Portisch Final: (Switzerland) Korchnoi beat (Soviet Union) Spassky	Candidates winner: (Switzerland) Korchnoi Defending champion: (Soviet Union) Karpov	Baguio 1978; First to 6 wins (Soviet Union) Karpov won 6–5 after 32 games (draws not counting)
1976–78	1976: Two single round robins 20 players each 3 qualified from each	Biel 1976: 1 (Denmark) Larsen; 2-4 (Soviet Union) Petrosian; 2-4 (Hungary) Portisch	1977: 8 players, matches Semi-finals: (Switzerland) Korchnoi beat (Soviet Union) Polugaevsky (Soviet Union) Spassky beat (Hungary) Portisch Final: (Switzerland) Korchnoi beat (Soviet Union) Spassky	Candidates winner: (Switzerland) Korchnoi Defending champion: (Soviet Union) Karpov	Baguio 1978; First to 6 wins (Soviet Union) Karpov won 6–5 after 32 games (draws not counting)
1976–78	1976: Two single round robins 20 players each 3 qualified from each	Manila 1976: 1 (Brazil) Mecking; 2-3 (Soviet Union) Polugaevsky; 2-3 (Czech Republic) Hort	1977: 8 players, matches Semi-finals: (Switzerland) Korchnoi beat (Soviet Union) Polugaevsky (Soviet Union) Spassky beat (Hungary) Portisch Final: (Switzerland) Korchnoi beat (Soviet Union) Spassky	Candidates winner: (Switzerland) Korchnoi Defending champion: (Soviet Union) Karpov	Baguio 1978; First to 6 wins (Soviet Union) Karpov won 6–5 after 32 games (draws not counting)
1979–81	1978 runner up	(Soviet Union) Korchnoi	1980: 8 players, matches Semi-finals: (Switzerland) Korchnoi beat (Soviet Union) Polugaevsky (West Germany) Hübner beat (Hungary) Portisch Final: (Switzerland) Korchnoi beat (West Germany) Hübner	Candidates winner: (Switzerland) Korchnoi Defending champion: (Soviet Union) Karpov	Meran 1981; First to 6 wins (Soviet Union) Karpov won 6–2 after 18 games (draws not counting)
1979–81	1977 Candidates runner up	(Soviet Union) Spassky	1980: 8 players, matches Semi-finals: (Switzerland) Korchnoi beat (Soviet Union) Polugaevsky (West Germany) Hübner beat (Hungary) Portisch Final: (Switzerland) Korchnoi beat (West Germany) Hübner	Candidates winner: (Switzerland) Korchnoi Defending champion: (Soviet Union) Karpov	Meran 1981; First to 6 wins (Soviet Union) Karpov won 6–2 after 18 games (draws not counting)
1979–81	1979: Two single round robins 18 players each 3 qualified from each	Riga 1979: 1-2 (Soviet Union) Tal; 1-2 (Soviet Union) Polugaevsky; 3-4 (Hungary) Adorján	1980: 8 players, matches Semi-finals: (Switzerland) Korchnoi beat (Soviet Union) Polugaevsky (West Germany) Hübner beat (Hungary) Portisch Final: (Switzerland) Korchnoi beat (West Germany) Hübner	Candidates winner: (Switzerland) Korchnoi Defending champion: (Soviet Union) Karpov	Meran 1981; First to 6 wins (Soviet Union) Karpov won 6–2 after 18 games (draws not counting)
1979–81	1979: Two single round robins 18 players each 3 qualified from each	Rio de Janeiro 1979: 1-3 (Hungary) Portisch; 1-3 (Soviet Union) Petrosian; 1-3 (West Germany) Hübner	1980: 8 players, matches Semi-finals: (Switzerland) Korchnoi beat (Soviet Union) Polugaevsky (West Germany) Hübner beat (Hungary) Portisch Final: (Switzerland) Korchnoi beat (West Germany) Hübner	Candidates winner: (Switzerland) Korchnoi Defending champion: (Soviet Union) Karpov	Meran 1981; First to 6 wins (Soviet Union) Karpov won 6–2 after 18 games (draws not counting)
1982–85	1981 runner up	(Switzerland) Korchnoi	1983–84: 8 players, matches Semi-finals, 1983: (Soviet Union) Kasparov beat (Switzerland) Korchnoi (Soviet Union) Smyslov beat (Hungary) Ribli Final, 1984: (Soviet Union) Kasparov beat (Soviet Union) Smyslov	Candidates winner: (Soviet Union) Kasparov Defending champion: (Soviet Union) Karpov	Moscow 1984–85; First to 6 wins Abandoned after 48 games ( (Soviet Union) Karpov led 5–3, draws not counting)
1982–85	1980 Candidates runner up	(West Germany) Hübner	1983–84: 8 players, matches Semi-finals, 1983: (Soviet Union) Kasparov beat (Switzerland) Korchnoi (Soviet Union) Smyslov beat (Hungary) Ribli Final, 1984: (Soviet Union) Kasparov beat (Soviet Union) Smyslov	Candidates winner: (Soviet Union) Kasparov Defending champion: (Soviet Union) Karpov	Moscow 1984–85; First to 6 wins Abandoned after 48 games ( (Soviet Union) Karpov led 5–3, draws not counting)
1982–85	1982: Three single round robins 14 players each 2 qualified from each	Las Palmas 1982: 1 (Hungary) Ribli; 2 (Soviet Union) Smyslov	1983–84: 8 players, matches Semi-finals, 1983: (Soviet Union) Kasparov beat (Switzerland) Korchnoi (Soviet Union) Smyslov beat (Hungary) Ribli Final, 1984: (Soviet Union) Kasparov beat (Soviet Union) Smyslov	Candidates winner: (Soviet Union) Kasparov Defending champion: (Soviet Union) Karpov	Moscow 1984–85; First to 6 wins Abandoned after 48 games ( (Soviet Union) Karpov led 5–3, draws not counting)
1982–85	1982: Three single round robins 14 players each 2 qualified from each	Toluca 1982: 1-2 (Hungary) Portisch; 1-2 (Philippines) Torre	1983–84: 8 players, matches Semi-finals, 1983: (Soviet Union) Kasparov beat (Switzerland) Korchnoi (Soviet Union) Smyslov beat (Hungary) Ribli Final, 1984: (Soviet Union) Kasparov beat (Soviet Union) Smyslov	Candidates winner: (Soviet Union) Kasparov Defending champion: (Soviet Union) Karpov	Moscow 1984–85; First to 6 wins Abandoned after 48 games ( (Soviet Union) Karpov led 5–3, draws not counting)
1982–85	1982: Three single round robins 14 players each 2 qualified from each	Moscow 1982: 1 (Soviet Union) Kasparov; 2 (Soviet Union) Beliavsky	1983–84: 8 players, matches Semi-finals, 1983: (Soviet Union) Kasparov beat (Switzerland) Korchnoi (Soviet Union) Smyslov beat (Hungary) Ribli Final, 1984: (Soviet Union) Kasparov beat (Soviet Union) Smyslov	Candidates winner: (Soviet Union) Kasparov Defending champion: (Soviet Union) Karpov	Moscow 1984–85; First to 6 wins Abandoned after 48 games ( (Soviet Union) Karpov led 5–3, draws not counting)
1985	Replay			(Soviet Union) Karpov (Soviet Union) Kasparov	Moscow 1985; 24-game match (Soviet Union) Kasparov won 13–11
1986	Rematch			(Soviet Union) Karpov (Soviet Union) Kasparov	London/Leningrad 1986; 24-game match (Soviet Union) Kasparov won 12½–11½
1985–87	1986 runner up (seeded into Candidates final)	(Soviet Union) Karpov	Montpellier 1985: Single round robin tournament 16 players, top 4 qualify 1-3 (Soviet Union) Yusupov; 1-3 (Soviet Union) Sokolov; 1-3 (Armenia) Vaganian; 4-5 (Netherlands) Timman 1986: Two rounds of matches Semi-finals: (Soviet Union) Yusupov beat (Netherlands) Timman (Soviet Union) Sokolov beat (Armenia) Vaganian; Final: (Soviet Union) Sokolov beat (Soviet Union) Yusupov Challenger Match; Linares, 1987: (Soviet Union) Karpov beat (Soviet Union) Sokolov	Candidates winner: (Soviet Union) Karpov Defending champion: (Soviet Union) Kasparov	Seville 1987; 24-game match Drawn 12–12 (Soviet Union) Kasparov retained title
1985–87	1983–84 Candidates semi-finalists	(Soviet Union) Korchnoi (Hungary) Ribli (Soviet Union) Smyslov	Montpellier 1985: Single round robin tournament 16 players, top 4 qualify 1-3 (Soviet Union) Yusupov; 1-3 (Soviet Union) Sokolov; 1-3 (Armenia) Vaganian; 4-5 (Netherlands) Timman 1986: Two rounds of matches Semi-finals: (Soviet Union) Yusupov beat (Netherlands) Timman (Soviet Union) Sokolov beat (Armenia) Vaganian; Final: (Soviet Union) Sokolov beat (Soviet Union) Yusupov Challenger Match; Linares, 1987: (Soviet Union) Karpov beat (Soviet Union) Sokolov	Candidates winner: (Soviet Union) Karpov Defending champion: (Soviet Union) Kasparov	Seville 1987; 24-game match Drawn 12–12 (Soviet Union) Kasparov retained title
1985–87	Organiser's wildcard	(France) Spassky	Montpellier 1985: Single round robin tournament 16 players, top 4 qualify 1-3 (Soviet Union) Yusupov; 1-3 (Soviet Union) Sokolov; 1-3 (Armenia) Vaganian; 4-5 (Netherlands) Timman 1986: Two rounds of matches Semi-finals: (Soviet Union) Yusupov beat (Netherlands) Timman (Soviet Union) Sokolov beat (Armenia) Vaganian; Final: (Soviet Union) Sokolov beat (Soviet Union) Yusupov Challenger Match; Linares, 1987: (Soviet Union) Karpov beat (Soviet Union) Sokolov	Candidates winner: (Soviet Union) Karpov Defending champion: (Soviet Union) Kasparov	Seville 1987; 24-game match Drawn 12–12 (Soviet Union) Kasparov retained title
1985–87	1985: 3 single round robins 16–18 players each 4 qualified from each	Biel 1985: 1 (Armenia) Vaganian; 2 (United States) Seirawan; 3 (Soviet Union) Sokolov; 4-6 (England) Short	Montpellier 1985: Single round robin tournament 16 players, top 4 qualify 1-3 (Soviet Union) Yusupov; 1-3 (Soviet Union) Sokolov; 1-3 (Armenia) Vaganian; 4-5 (Netherlands) Timman 1986: Two rounds of matches Semi-finals: (Soviet Union) Yusupov beat (Netherlands) Timman (Soviet Union) Sokolov beat (Armenia) Vaganian; Final: (Soviet Union) Sokolov beat (Soviet Union) Yusupov Challenger Match; Linares, 1987: (Soviet Union) Karpov beat (Soviet Union) Sokolov	Candidates winner: (Soviet Union) Karpov Defending champion: (Soviet Union) Kasparov	Seville 1987; 24-game match Drawn 12–12 (Soviet Union) Kasparov retained title
1985–87	1985: 3 single round robins 16–18 players each 4 qualified from each	Taxco 1985: 1 (Netherlands) Timman; 2 (Cuba) Nogueiras; 3 (Soviet Union) Tal; 4 (Canada) Spraggett	Montpellier 1985: Single round robin tournament 16 players, top 4 qualify 1-3 (Soviet Union) Yusupov; 1-3 (Soviet Union) Sokolov; 1-3 (Armenia) Vaganian; 4-5 (Netherlands) Timman 1986: Two rounds of matches Semi-finals: (Soviet Union) Yusupov beat (Netherlands) Timman (Soviet Union) Sokolov beat (Armenia) Vaganian; Final: (Soviet Union) Sokolov beat (Soviet Union) Yusupov Challenger Match; Linares, 1987: (Soviet Union) Karpov beat (Soviet Union) Sokolov	Candidates winner: (Soviet Union) Karpov Defending champion: (Soviet Union) Kasparov	Seville 1987; 24-game match Drawn 12–12 (Soviet Union) Kasparov retained title
1985–87	1985: 3 single round robins 16–18 players each 4 qualified from each	Tunis 1985: 1 (Soviet Union) Yusupov; 2 (Soviet Union) Beliavsky; 3 (Hungary) Portisch; 4-5 (Soviet Union) Chernin	Montpellier 1985: Single round robin tournament 16 players, top 4 qualify 1-3 (Soviet Union) Yusupov; 1-3 (Soviet Union) Sokolov; 1-3 (Armenia) Vaganian; 4-5 (Netherlands) Timman 1986: Two rounds of matches Semi-finals: (Soviet Union) Yusupov beat (Netherlands) Timman (Soviet Union) Sokolov beat (Armenia) Vaganian; Final: (Soviet Union) Sokolov beat (Soviet Union) Yusupov Challenger Match; Linares, 1987: (Soviet Union) Karpov beat (Soviet Union) Sokolov	Candidates winner: (Soviet Union) Karpov Defending champion: (Soviet Union) Kasparov	Seville 1987; 24-game match Drawn 12–12 (Soviet Union) Kasparov retained title
1987–90	1987 runner-up (seeded into quarter-finals)	(Soviet Union) Karpov	1988–89: 15 players, matches Semi-finals (1989): (Soviet Union) Karpov beat (Soviet Union) Yusupov (Netherlands) Timman beat (England) Speelman Final (1990): (Soviet Union) Karpov beat (Netherlands) Timman	Candidates winner: (Soviet Union) Karpov Defending champion: (Russia) Kasparov	New York City/Lyon 1990; 24-game match (Russia) Kasparov won 12½–11½
1987–90	1986 semi-finalists	(Soviet Union) Sokolov (Netherlands) Timman (Armenia) Vaganian (Soviet Union) Yusupov	1988–89: 15 players, matches Semi-finals (1989): (Soviet Union) Karpov beat (Soviet Union) Yusupov (Netherlands) Timman beat (England) Speelman Final (1990): (Soviet Union) Karpov beat (Netherlands) Timman	Candidates winner: (Soviet Union) Karpov Defending champion: (Russia) Kasparov	New York City/Lyon 1990; 24-game match (Russia) Kasparov won 12½–11½
1987–90	Organiser's wildcard	(Canada) Spraggett	1988–89: 15 players, matches Semi-finals (1989): (Soviet Union) Karpov beat (Soviet Union) Yusupov (Netherlands) Timman beat (England) Speelman Final (1990): (Soviet Union) Karpov beat (Netherlands) Timman	Candidates winner: (Soviet Union) Karpov Defending champion: (Russia) Kasparov	New York City/Lyon 1990; 24-game match (Russia) Kasparov won 12½–11½
1987–90	1987: Three single round robins 17–18 players each 3 qualified from each	Subotica 1987: 1-3 (Hungary) Sax; 1-3 (England) Short; 1-3 (England) Speelman	1988–89: 15 players, matches Semi-finals (1989): (Soviet Union) Karpov beat (Soviet Union) Yusupov (Netherlands) Timman beat (England) Speelman Final (1990): (Soviet Union) Karpov beat (Netherlands) Timman	Candidates winner: (Soviet Union) Karpov Defending champion: (Russia) Kasparov	New York City/Lyon 1990; 24-game match (Russia) Kasparov won 12½–11½
1987–90	1987: Three single round robins 17–18 players each 3 qualified from each	Szirák 1987: 1-2 (Soviet Union) Salov; 1-2 (Iceland) Hjartarson; 3-4 (Hungary) Portisch	1988–89: 15 players, matches Semi-finals (1989): (Soviet Union) Karpov beat (Soviet Union) Yusupov (Netherlands) Timman beat (England) Speelman Final (1990): (Soviet Union) Karpov beat (Netherlands) Timman	Candidates winner: (Soviet Union) Karpov Defending champion: (Russia) Kasparov	New York City/Lyon 1990; 24-game match (Russia) Kasparov won 12½–11½
1987–90	1987: Three single round robins 17–18 players each 3 qualified from each	Zagreb 1987: 1 (Soviet Union) Korchnoi; 2-3 (United States) Seirawan; 2-3 (Soviet Union) Ehlvest	1988–89: 15 players, matches Semi-finals (1989): (Soviet Union) Karpov beat (Soviet Union) Yusupov (Netherlands) Timman beat (England) Speelman Final (1990): (Soviet Union) Karpov beat (Netherlands) Timman	Candidates winner: (Soviet Union) Karpov Defending champion: (Russia) Kasparov	New York City/Lyon 1990; 24-game match (Russia) Kasparov won 12½–11½
1990–93	1990 runner up (seeded into quarter-finals)	(Soviet Union) Karpov	1991–92: 15 players, matches Semi-finals (1992): (England) Short beat (Russia) Karpov (Netherlands) Timman beat (Russia) Yusupov Final (1993): (England) Short beat (Netherlands) Timman	Candidates winner: (England) Short Defending champion: (Russia) Kasparov	London September–October 1993; 24-game match (Russia) Kasparov defeated Short 12½–7½ under the auspices of the PCA
1990–93	1989 Candidates semi-finalists	(Netherlands) Timman (Soviet Union) Yusupov (England) Speelman	1991–92: 15 players, matches Semi-finals (1992): (England) Short beat (Russia) Karpov (Netherlands) Timman beat (Russia) Yusupov Final (1993): (England) Short beat (Netherlands) Timman	Candidates winner: (England) Short Defending champion: (Russia) Kasparov	London September–October 1993; 24-game match (Russia) Kasparov defeated Short 12½–7½ under the auspices of the PCA
1990–93	Manila 1990; 64 players Swiss; 11 qualified	1-2 (Soviet Union) Gelfand; 1-2 (Soviet Union) Ivanchuk; 3-4 (India) Anand; 3-4 (England) Short; 5-11 (Hungary) Sax; 5-11 (Switzerland) Korchnoi; 5-11 (West Germany) Hübner; 5-11 (Socialist Federal Republic of Yugoslavia) Nikolić; 5-11 (Soviet Union) Yudasin; 5-11 (Soviet Union) Dolmatov; 5-11 (Soviet Union) Dreev	1991–92: 15 players, matches Semi-finals (1992): (England) Short beat (Russia) Karpov (Netherlands) Timman beat (Russia) Yusupov Final (1993): (England) Short beat (Netherlands) Timman	Candidates finalist: (Netherlands) Timman Former world champion: (Russia) Karpov	Netherlands /Jakarta; September–November 1993; 24-game match (Russia) Karpov defeated Timman 12½–8½ under the auspices of FIDE
1993–95 (PCA)	1993 PCA runner-up	(England) Short	1994–95: 8 players, matches Semi-finals: (United States) Kamsky beat (England) Short (India) Anand beat (England) Adams Final (1995): (India) Anand beat (United States) Kamsky	Candidates winner: (India) Anand Defending PCA champion: (Russia) Kasparov	New York City; September–October 1995; 20-game match (Russia) Kasparov won 10½–7½
1993–95 (PCA)	Groningen December 1993; 54 player Swiss; 7 qualified	1-2 (England) Adams; 1-2 (India) Anand; 3-7 (United States) Kamsky; 3-7 (Russia) Kramnik; 3-7 (Netherlands) Tiviakov; 3-7 (Russia) Gulko; 3-7 (Ukraine) Romanishin	1994–95: 8 players, matches Semi-finals: (United States) Kamsky beat (England) Short (India) Anand beat (England) Adams Final (1995): (India) Anand beat (United States) Kamsky	Candidates winner: (India) Anand Defending PCA champion: (Russia) Kasparov	New York City; September–October 1995; 20-game match (Russia) Kasparov won 10½–7½
1993–96 (FIDE)	1993 FIDE World Champion (seeded into Candidates final)	(Russia) Karpov	1994: Two rounds of matches 12 players Finals, 1995: (Russia) Karpov beat (Belarus) Gelfand (United States) Kamsky beat (Russia) Salov	Candidates final match winners: (Russia) Karpov (United States) Kamsky	Elista 1996; 20-game match (Russia) Karpov won 10½–7½
1993–96 (FIDE)	1993 FIDE Candidates semi-finalists	(Netherlands) Timman (Russia) Yusupov	1994: Two rounds of matches 12 players Finals, 1995: (Russia) Karpov beat (Belarus) Gelfand (United States) Kamsky beat (Russia) Salov	Candidates final match winners: (Russia) Karpov (United States) Kamsky	Elista 1996; 20-game match (Russia) Karpov won 10½–7½
1993–96 (FIDE)	Biel July 1993; 73 players Swiss; 10 qualified	1 (Belarus) Gelfand; 2-9 (Netherlands) Van der Sterren; 2-9 (United States) Kamsky; 2-9 (Russia) Khalifman; 2-9 (England) Adams; 2-9 (Russia) Yudasin; 2-9 (Russia) Salov; 2-9 (France) Lautier; 2-9 (Russia) Kramnik; 10-15 (India) Anand	1994: Two rounds of matches 12 players Finals, 1995: (Russia) Karpov beat (Belarus) Gelfand (United States) Kamsky beat (Russia) Salov	Candidates final match winners: (Russia) Karpov (United States) Kamsky	Elista 1996; 20-game match (Russia) Karpov won 10½–7½

== Split titles (1997–2005) ==
After 1996, interzonals ceased to exist, but FIDE continued to organize qualifying zonal tournaments.

Classical championships (1998–2004)
Years	Candidates format	Seeded into Candidates		Candidates Winner(s)	Seeded in Final	Championship Final
1998 (Classical)	Cazorla, May–June 1998; 10-game match	(Russia) Kramnik (Spain) Shirov (on rating)		(Spain) Shirov won 5½–3½	(Russia) Kasparov (1995 champion)	Match never took place
2000 (Classical)	None				(Russia) Kasparov (1995 champion) (Russia) Kramnik (on rating)	London, October–November 2000; 16-game match (Russia) Kramnik won 8½–6½
2002–2004 (Classical)	Dortmund, July 2002; Two double round-robins, top two in each group advanced to knockout matches	Preliminaries: Group 1: 1. (Spain) Shirov; 2. (Bulgaria) Topalov; 3. (Israel) Gelfand; 4. (Germany) Lutz; Group 2: 1. (Russia) Bareev; 2. (Hungary) Leko; 3. (England) Adams; 4. (Russia) Morozevich	Semi-finals: (Hungary) Leko beat (Spain) Shirov (Bulgaria) Topalov beat (Russia) Bareev	(Hungary) Leko (beat (Bulgaria) Topalov in the final)	(Russia) Kramnik (2000 Classical champion)	Brissago, September–October 2004; 14-game match Drawn 7–7, (Russia) Kramnik retained title
FIDE championships (1997–2005)
Years	Candidates format	Seeded into Candidates		Finalists		Championship Final
1997–1998 (FIDE)	Groningen; December 1997, 7 round, mini-match, knockout tournament Winner plays 6-game championship match against Karpov	97 players, Quarter-finalists: (England) Adams, (Netherlands) Van Wely, (England) Short, (Russia) Krasenkov, (Israel) Gelfand, (Russia) Dreev, (India) Anand, (Spain) Shirov.		(India) Anand (beat (England) Adams in candidates final) (Russia) Karpov (1996 FIDE champion)		Lausanne: January 1998; 6-game match Drawn 3–3; (Russia) Karpov won rapid playoff 2–0
1999 (FIDE)	Las Vegas; July–August 1999, 7 round, mini-match, knockout tournament	100 players, Quarter-finalists: (Russia) Kramnik, (England) Adams, (Russia) Movsesian, (Armenia) Akopian, (Spain) Shirov, (Romania) Nisipeanu, (Russia) Khalifman and (Hungary) J. Polgar		Semi-finals (4-game matches): (Russia) Khalifman beat (Romania) Nisipeanu (Armenia) Akopian beat (England) Adams		Las Vegas 1999; 6-game match (Russia) Khalifman won 3½–2½
2000 (FIDE)	New Delhi (6 rounds)/final in Tehran; November–December 2000; 7 round, mini-match, knockout tournament with final match played in Tehran	100 players, Quarter-finalists: (India) Anand, (Russia) Khalifman, (England) Adams, (Bulgaria) Topalov, (Kazakhstan) Tkachiev, (Russia) Grischuk, (Spain) Shirov and (Russia) Bareev		Semi-finals (4-game matches): (India) Anand beat (England) Adams, (Spain) Shirov beat (Russia) Grischuk		Tehran; December 2000; 6-game match (India) Anand won 3½–½
2001–2002 (FIDE)	Moscow; 7 round, mini-match, knockout tournament with relatively quick time controls first part (6 rounds): 25 November – 14 December 2001 final: 16–24 January 2002	128 players, Quarter-finalists: (India) Anand, (Spain) Shirov, (Ukraine) Ivanchuk, (France) Lautier, (Russia) Svidler, (Israel) Gelfand, (Ukraine) Ponomariov and (Russia) Bareev		Semi-finals (4-game matches): (Ukraine) Ponomariov beat (Russia) Svidler, (Ukraine) Ivanchuk beat (India) Anand		Moscow, January 2002; 8-game match (Ukraine) Ponomariov won 4½–2½
2004 (FIDE)	Tripoli; June–July 2004; 7 round, mini-match, knockout tournament with relatively quick time controls	128 players, Quarter-finalists: (Bulgaria) Topalov, (Russia) Kharlov, (Uzbekistan) Kasimdzhanov, (Russia) Grischuk, (Azerbaijan) Radjabov, (Cuba) Dominguez, (England) Adams, (Armenia) Akopian		Semi-finals (4-game matches): (England) Adams beat (Azerbaijan) Radjabov (Uzbekistan) Kasimdzhanov beat (Bulgaria) Topalov		Tripoli, July 2004; 6-game match Drawn 3–3; (Uzbekistan) Kasimdzhanov won rapid playoff 1½–½
FIDE World Chess Championship, 2005
Year	Candidates format		Seeded in Final			Championship Final
2005 (FIDE)	None, 8 players seeded in final:		(Uzbekistan) Kasimdzhanov (FIDE champion); (England) Adams (as FIDE 2004 finalist); (Hungary) Leko (as classical 2004 finalist), (Russia) Morozevich (on rating) (Bulgaria) Topalov (on rating), (India) Anand (on rating), (Hungary) J. Polgár (on rating) (Russia) Svidler (on rating)			San Luis: 8 players, double round robin, September–October 2005; 1 (Bulgaria) Topalov: 10/14; 2-3 (India) Anand 8½/14; 2-3 (Russia) Svidler 8½/14; 4 (Russia) Morozevich 7/14

== Reunified title (since 2006) ==
After the reunification of the FIDE and "classical" titles, the Chess World Cup and FIDE Grand Prix series were introduced as qualification for the Candidates Tournament. The Swiss-system FIDE Grand Swiss was introduced in the latter half of 2019, acting as another qualification path for the 2020 Candidates Tournament.

Reunification Match
Year			Seeded in Final		Championship Match
2006	Reunification match		(Bulgaria) Topalov (FIDE champion) (Russia) Kramnik (Classical champion)		Elista, October 2006; 12-game match Drawn 6–6 (Russia) Kramnik won rapid playoff 2½–1½
World Chess Championships after the Reunification
Years	Qualification format	Qualifiers	Candidates Format	Candidates Winner(s)	Seeded in Final	Championship Final
2005–2007	FIDE World Chess Championship 2004; Champion	(Uzbekistan) Kasimdzhanov	Candidates Matches 2007; Elista, May–June 2007; 16 players, two rounds of matches 4 players qualify for championship tournament	(Armenia) Aronian (Israel) Gelfand (Russia) Grischuk (Hungary) Leko	(Russia) Kramnik (2006 Champion) 2nd-4th in 2005: (India) Anand (Russia) Svidler (Russia) Morozevich	Mexico City, September 2007; 8 player double round robin tournament 1. (India) Anand, 9.0/14; 2-3 (Russia) Kramnik 8.0/14; 2-3 (Israel) Gelfand 8.0/14
2005–2007	Rating lists	(Hungary) Leko (England) Adams (Hungary) Polgár (Spain) Shirov (France) Bacrot	Candidates Matches 2007; Elista, May–June 2007; 16 players, two rounds of matches 4 players qualify for championship tournament	(Armenia) Aronian (Israel) Gelfand (Russia) Grischuk (Hungary) Leko	(Russia) Kramnik (2006 Champion) 2nd-4th in 2005: (India) Anand (Russia) Svidler (Russia) Morozevich	Mexico City, September 2007; 8 player double round robin tournament 1. (India) Anand, 9.0/14; 2-3 (Russia) Kramnik 8.0/14; 2-3 (Israel) Gelfand 8.0/14
2005–2007	Chess World Cup 2005; Top 10 qualified (excluding rating qualifiers)	(Ukraine) Ponomariov (Armenia) Aronian (Russia) Grischuk (Russia) Bareev (Israel) Gelfand (Russia) Rublevsky (Turkey) Gurevich (United States) Kamsky (Norway) Carlsen (Russia) Malakhov	Candidates Matches 2007; Elista, May–June 2007; 16 players, two rounds of matches 4 players qualify for championship tournament	(Armenia) Aronian (Israel) Gelfand (Russia) Grischuk (Hungary) Leko	(Russia) Kramnik (2006 Champion) 2nd-4th in 2005: (India) Anand (Russia) Svidler (Russia) Morozevich	Mexico City, September 2007; 8 player double round robin tournament 1. (India) Anand, 9.0/14; 2-3 (Russia) Kramnik 8.0/14; 2-3 (Israel) Gelfand 8.0/14
2008	Rematch			(India) Anand (2007 Champion) (Russia) Kramnik (2006 Champion)		Bonn, October 2008; 12-game match (India) Anand won 6½–4½ to retain the title.
2007–2010	World Chess Championship 2006; Runner-up	(Bulgaria) Topalov	Candidates Match 2009; Sofia, February 2009; 8-game match	(Bulgaria) Topalov (won 4½–2½)	(India) Anand (2008 champion)	Sofia, April–May 2010; 12-game match (India) Anand won 6½–5½ to retain the title.
2007–2010	Chess World Cup 2007; 1st qualified	(United States) Kamsky	Candidates Match 2009; Sofia, February 2009; 8-game match	(Bulgaria) Topalov (won 4½–2½)	(India) Anand (2008 champion)	Sofia, April–May 2010; 12-game match (India) Anand won 6½–5½ to retain the title.
2008–2012	2009 Challenger Match; Runner-up	(United States) Kamsky	Candidates Tournament 2011; Kazan, May 2011, 8 players, matches	(Israel) Gelfand	(India) Anand (2010 champion)	Moscow, May 2012; 12-game match drawn 6–6 (India) Anand won rapid playoff 2½–1½ to retain the title
2008–2012	Chess World Cup 2009; 1st qualified	(Israel) Gelfand	Candidates Tournament 2011; Kazan, May 2011, 8 players, matches	(Israel) Gelfand	(India) Anand (2010 champion)	Moscow, May 2012; 12-game match drawn 6–6 (India) Anand won rapid playoff 2½–1½ to retain the title
2008–2012	2010 World Championship; Runner-up	(Bulgaria) Topalov	Candidates Tournament 2011; Kazan, May 2011, 8 players, matches	(Israel) Gelfand	(India) Anand (2010 champion)	Moscow, May 2012; 12-game match drawn 6–6 (India) Anand won rapid playoff 2½–1½ to retain the title
2008–2012	FIDE Grand Prix 2008–2010; Top 2 qualified	(Armenia) Aronian (Azerbaijan) Radjabov (Russia) Grischuk	Candidates Tournament 2011; Kazan, May 2011, 8 players, matches	(Israel) Gelfand	(India) Anand (2010 champion)	Moscow, May 2012; 12-game match drawn 6–6 (India) Anand won rapid playoff 2½–1½ to retain the title
2008–2012	Rating lists Top two not yet qualified	~~(Norway) Carlsen~~ (Russia) Kramnik	Candidates Tournament 2011; Kazan, May 2011, 8 players, matches	(Israel) Gelfand	(India) Anand (2010 champion)	Moscow, May 2012; 12-game match drawn 6–6 (India) Anand won rapid playoff 2½–1½ to retain the title
2008–2012	Organiser's wildcard	(Azerbaijan) Mamedyarov	Candidates Tournament 2011; Kazan, May 2011, 8 players, matches	(Israel) Gelfand	(India) Anand (2010 champion)	Moscow, May 2012; 12-game match drawn 6–6 (India) Anand won rapid playoff 2½–1½ to retain the title
2011–2013	2010 World Championship; Runner-up	(Israel) Gelfand	Candidates Tournament 2013; London, March 2013; 8 player double round-robin tournament	(Norway) Carlsen	(India) Anand (2012 champion)	Chennai, November 2013; 12-game match (Norway) Carlsen won 6½–3½
2011–2013	Chess World Cup 2011; Top 3 qualified	(Russia) Svidler (Russia) Grischuk (Ukraine) Ivanchuk	Candidates Tournament 2013; London, March 2013; 8 player double round-robin tournament	(Norway) Carlsen	(India) Anand (2012 champion)	Chennai, November 2013; 12-game match (Norway) Carlsen won 6½–3½
2011–2013	Rating lists	(Norway) Carlsen (Armenia) Aronian (Russia) Kramnik	Candidates Tournament 2013; London, March 2013; 8 player double round-robin tournament	(Norway) Carlsen	(India) Anand (2012 champion)	Chennai, November 2013; 12-game match (Norway) Carlsen won 6½–3½
2011–2013	Organiser's wildcard	(Azerbaijan) Radjabov	Candidates Tournament 2013; London, March 2013; 8 player double round-robin tournament	(Norway) Carlsen	(India) Anand (2012 champion)	Chennai, November 2013; 12-game match (Norway) Carlsen won 6½–3½
2012–2014	2013 World Championship; Runner-up	(India) Anand	Candidates Tournament 2014; Khanty-Mansiysk,, March 2014; 8 player double round-robin tournament	(India) Anand	(Norway) Carlsen (2013 champion)	Sochi, November 2014; 12-game match (Norway) Carlsen won 6½-4½ to retain the title
2012–2014	Chess World Cup 2013; Top 2 qualified	(Russia) Kramnik (Russia) Andreikin	Candidates Tournament 2014; Khanty-Mansiysk,, March 2014; 8 player double round-robin tournament	(India) Anand	(Norway) Carlsen (2013 champion)	Sochi, November 2014; 12-game match (Norway) Carlsen won 6½-4½ to retain the title
2012–2014	FIDE Grand Prix 2012–2013; Top 2 qualified	(Bulgaria) Topalov (Azerbaijan) Mamedyarov	Candidates Tournament 2014; Khanty-Mansiysk,, March 2014; 8 player double round-robin tournament	(India) Anand	(Norway) Carlsen (2013 champion)	Sochi, November 2014; 12-game match (Norway) Carlsen won 6½-4½ to retain the title
2012–2014	Rating lists	(Armenia) Aronian (Russia) Karjakin	Candidates Tournament 2014; Khanty-Mansiysk,, March 2014; 8 player double round-robin tournament	(India) Anand	(Norway) Carlsen (2013 champion)	Sochi, November 2014; 12-game match (Norway) Carlsen won 6½-4½ to retain the title
2012–2014	Organiser's wildcard	(Russia) Svidler	Candidates Tournament 2014; Khanty-Mansiysk,, March 2014; 8 player double round-robin tournament	(India) Anand	(Norway) Carlsen (2013 champion)	Sochi, November 2014; 12-game match (Norway) Carlsen won 6½-4½ to retain the title
2014–2016	2014 World Championship; Runner-up	(India) Anand	Candidates Tournament 2016; Moscow, March 2016; 8 player double round-robin tournament	(Russia) Karjakin	(Norway) Carlsen (2014 champion)	New York City, November 2016; 12-game match drawn 6–6 (Norway) Carlsen won rapid playoff 3–1 to retain the title
2014–2016	FIDE Grand Prix 2014–15; Top 2 qualified	(United States) Caruana (United States) Nakamura	Candidates Tournament 2016; Moscow, March 2016; 8 player double round-robin tournament	(Russia) Karjakin	(Norway) Carlsen (2014 champion)	New York City, November 2016; 12-game match drawn 6–6 (Norway) Carlsen won rapid playoff 3–1 to retain the title
2014–2016	Chess World Cup 2015; Top 2 qualified	(Russia) Karjakin (Russia) Svidler	Candidates Tournament 2016; Moscow, March 2016; 8 player double round-robin tournament	(Russia) Karjakin	(Norway) Carlsen (2014 champion)	New York City, November 2016; 12-game match drawn 6–6 (Norway) Carlsen won rapid playoff 3–1 to retain the title
2014–2016	Rating lists	(Bulgaria) Topalov (Netherlands) Giri	Candidates Tournament 2016; Moscow, March 2016; 8 player double round-robin tournament	(Russia) Karjakin	(Norway) Carlsen (2014 champion)	New York City, November 2016; 12-game match drawn 6–6 (Norway) Carlsen won rapid playoff 3–1 to retain the title
2014–2016	Organiser's wildcard	(Armenia) Aronian	Candidates Tournament 2016; Moscow, March 2016; 8 player double round-robin tournament	(Russia) Karjakin	(Norway) Carlsen (2014 champion)	New York City, November 2016; 12-game match drawn 6–6 (Norway) Carlsen won rapid playoff 3–1 to retain the title
2017–2018	2016 World Championship; Runner-up	(Russia) Karjakin	Candidates Tournament 2018; Berlin, March 2018; 8 player double round-robin tournament	(United States) Caruana	(Norway) Carlsen (2016 champion)	London, November 2018; 12-game match drawn 6–6 (Norway) Carlsen won rapid playoff 3–0 to retain the title
2017–2018	Chess World Cup 2017; Top 2 qualified	(Armenia) Aronian (China) Ding	Candidates Tournament 2018; Berlin, March 2018; 8 player double round-robin tournament	(United States) Caruana	(Norway) Carlsen (2016 champion)	London, November 2018; 12-game match drawn 6–6 (Norway) Carlsen won rapid playoff 3–0 to retain the title
2017–2018	FIDE Grand Prix 2017; Top 2 qualified	(Azerbaijan) Mamedyarov (Russia) Grischuk	Candidates Tournament 2018; Berlin, March 2018; 8 player double round-robin tournament	(United States) Caruana	(Norway) Carlsen (2016 champion)	London, November 2018; 12-game match drawn 6–6 (Norway) Carlsen won rapid playoff 3–0 to retain the title
2017–2018	Rating lists	(United States) Caruana (United States) So	Candidates Tournament 2018; Berlin, March 2018; 8 player double round-robin tournament	(United States) Caruana	(Norway) Carlsen (2016 champion)	London, November 2018; 12-game match drawn 6–6 (Norway) Carlsen won rapid playoff 3–0 to retain the title
2017–2018	Organiser's wildcard	(Russia) Kramnik	Candidates Tournament 2018; Berlin, March 2018; 8 player double round-robin tournament	(United States) Caruana	(Norway) Carlsen (2016 champion)	London, November 2018; 12-game match drawn 6–6 (Norway) Carlsen won rapid playoff 3–0 to retain the title
2019–2021	2018 World Championship; Runner-up	(United States) Caruana	Candidates Tournament 2020–21; Yekaterinburg, Mar-Apr 2020 & Apr 2021; 8 player double round-robin tournament	(Russia) Nepomniachtchi	(Norway) Carlsen (2018 champion)	Dubai, November–December 2021; 14-game match (Norway) Carlsen won to retain title, 7½–3½
2019–2021	Chess World Cup 2019; Top 2 qualified	~~(Azerbaijan) Radjabov~~ (China) Ding	Candidates Tournament 2020–21; Yekaterinburg, Mar-Apr 2020 & Apr 2021; 8 player double round-robin tournament	(Russia) Nepomniachtchi	(Norway) Carlsen (2018 champion)	Dubai, November–December 2021; 14-game match (Norway) Carlsen won to retain title, 7½–3½
2019–2021	FIDE Grand Swiss Tournament 2019; 1st qualified	(China) Wang	Candidates Tournament 2020–21; Yekaterinburg, Mar-Apr 2020 & Apr 2021; 8 player double round-robin tournament	(Russia) Nepomniachtchi	(Norway) Carlsen (2018 champion)	Dubai, November–December 2021; 14-game match (Norway) Carlsen won to retain title, 7½–3½
2019–2021	FIDE Grand Prix 2019; Top 2 qualified	(Russia) Grischuk (Russia) Nepomniachtchi	Candidates Tournament 2020–21; Yekaterinburg, Mar-Apr 2020 & Apr 2021; 8 player double round-robin tournament	(Russia) Nepomniachtchi	(Norway) Carlsen (2018 champion)	Dubai, November–December 2021; 14-game match (Norway) Carlsen won to retain title, 7½–3½
2019–2021	Rating lists	(Netherlands) Giri (France) Vachier-Lagrave	Candidates Tournament 2020–21; Yekaterinburg, Mar-Apr 2020 & Apr 2021; 8 player double round-robin tournament	(Russia) Nepomniachtchi	(Norway) Carlsen (2018 champion)	Dubai, November–December 2021; 14-game match (Norway) Carlsen won to retain title, 7½–3½
2019–2021	Organiser's wildcard	(Russia) Alekseenko	Candidates Tournament 2020–21; Yekaterinburg, Mar-Apr 2020 & Apr 2021; 8 player double round-robin tournament	(Russia) Nepomniachtchi	(Norway) Carlsen (2018 champion)	Dubai, November–December 2021; 14-game match (Norway) Carlsen won to retain title, 7½–3½
2021–2023	2021 World Championship; Runner-up	(Russia) Nepomniachtchi	Candidates Tournament 2022; Madrid, June–July 2022; 8 player double round-robin tournament	(Russia) Nepomniachtchi (China) Ding	~~(Norway) Carlsen~~; ~~(2021 champion)~~	Astana, April–May 2023; 14-game match drawn 7–7 (China) Ding won rapid playoff 2½–1½
2021–2023	Wildcard	(Azerbaijan) Radjabov	Candidates Tournament 2022; Madrid, June–July 2022; 8 player double round-robin tournament	(Russia) Nepomniachtchi (China) Ding	~~(Norway) Carlsen~~; ~~(2021 champion)~~	Astana, April–May 2023; 14-game match drawn 7–7 (China) Ding won rapid playoff 2½–1½
2021–2023	Chess World Cup 2021; Top 2 qualified	(Poland) Duda; ~~(Russia) Karjakin~~	Candidates Tournament 2022; Madrid, June–July 2022; 8 player double round-robin tournament	(Russia) Nepomniachtchi (China) Ding	~~(Norway) Carlsen~~; ~~(2021 champion)~~	Astana, April–May 2023; 14-game match drawn 7–7 (China) Ding won rapid playoff 2½–1½
2021–2023	FIDE Grand Swiss Tournament 2021; Top 2 qualified	(France) Firouzja (United States) Caruana	Candidates Tournament 2022; Madrid, June–July 2022; 8 player double round-robin tournament	(Russia) Nepomniachtchi (China) Ding	~~(Norway) Carlsen~~; ~~(2021 champion)~~	Astana, April–May 2023; 14-game match drawn 7–7 (China) Ding won rapid playoff 2½–1½
2021–2023	FIDE Grand Prix 2022; Top 2 qualified	(United States) Nakamura (Hungary) Rapport	Candidates Tournament 2022; Madrid, June–July 2022; 8 player double round-robin tournament	(Russia) Nepomniachtchi (China) Ding	~~(Norway) Carlsen~~; ~~(2021 champion)~~	Astana, April–May 2023; 14-game match drawn 7–7 (China) Ding won rapid playoff 2½–1½
2021–2023	Rating list	(China) Ding	Candidates Tournament 2022; Madrid, June–July 2022; 8 player double round-robin tournament	(Russia) Nepomniachtchi (China) Ding	~~(Norway) Carlsen~~; ~~(2021 champion)~~	Astana, April–May 2023; 14-game match drawn 7–7 (China) Ding won rapid playoff 2½–1½
2023–2024	2023 World Championship; Runner-up	(Russia) Nepomniachtchi	Candidates Tournament 2024; Toronto, April 2024; 8 player double round-robin tournament	(India) Gukesh	(China) Ding (2023 champion)	Singapore, November–December 2024; 14-game match (India) Gukesh won 7½–6½
2023–2024	Chess World Cup 2023; Top 3 qualified	~~(Norway) Carlsen~~ (India) Praggnanandhaa (United States) Caruana (Azerbaijan) Abasov	Candidates Tournament 2024; Toronto, April 2024; 8 player double round-robin tournament	(India) Gukesh	(China) Ding (2023 champion)	Singapore, November–December 2024; 14-game match (India) Gukesh won 7½–6½
2023–2024	FIDE Grand Swiss Tournament 2023; Top 2 qualified	(India) Vidit (United States) Nakamura	Candidates Tournament 2024; Toronto, April 2024; 8 player double round-robin tournament	(India) Gukesh	(China) Ding (2023 champion)	Singapore, November–December 2024; 14-game match (India) Gukesh won 7½–6½
2023–2024	FIDE Circuit 2023; 1st qualified	(India) Gukesh	Candidates Tournament 2024; Toronto, April 2024; 8 player double round-robin tournament	(India) Gukesh	(China) Ding (2023 champion)	Singapore, November–December 2024; 14-game match (India) Gukesh won 7½–6½
2023–2024	Rating list	(France) Firouzja	Candidates Tournament 2024; Toronto, April 2024; 8 player double round-robin tournament	(India) Gukesh	(China) Ding (2023 champion)	Singapore, November–December 2024; 14-game match (India) Gukesh won 7½–6½
2024–2026	FIDE Circuit 2024; 1st qualified	(United States) Caruana	Candidates Tournament 2026; Paphos, March–April 2026; 8 player double round-robin tournament	(Uzbekistan) Sindarov	(India) Gukesh (2024 champion)	Geneva, November–December 2026; 14-game match
2024–2026	FIDE Grand Swiss Tournament 2025; Top 2 qualified	(Netherlands) Giri (Germany) Blübaum	Candidates Tournament 2026; Paphos, March–April 2026; 8 player double round-robin tournament	(Uzbekistan) Sindarov	(India) Gukesh (2024 champion)	Geneva, November–December 2026; 14-game match
2024–2026	Chess World Cup 2025; Top 3 qualified	(Uzbekistan) Sindarov (China) Wei (Russia) Esipenko	Candidates Tournament 2026; Paphos, March–April 2026; 8 player double round-robin tournament	(Uzbekistan) Sindarov	(India) Gukesh (2024 champion)	Geneva, November–December 2026; 14-game match
2024–2026	FIDE Circuit 2025; 1st qualified	(India) Praggnanandhaa	Candidates Tournament 2026; Paphos, March–April 2026; 8 player double round-robin tournament	(Uzbekistan) Sindarov	(India) Gukesh (2024 champion)	Geneva, November–December 2026; 14-game match
2024–2026	Rating list	(United States) Nakamura	Candidates Tournament 2026; Paphos, March–April 2026; 8 player double round-robin tournament	(Uzbekistan) Sindarov	(India) Gukesh (2024 champion)	Geneva, November–December 2026; 14-game match
2026–2028	Total Chess World Championship Tour 2026–2027; Top 2 qualified		Candidates Tournament 2028; TBD; 8 player double round-robin tournament	TBD	TBD	TBD
2026–2028	FIDE Grand Swiss Tournament 2027; Top 2 qualified		Candidates Tournament 2028; TBD; 8 player double round-robin tournament	TBD	TBD	TBD
2026–2028	Chess World Cup 2027; Top 2 qualified		Candidates Tournament 2028; TBD; 8 player double round-robin tournament	TBD	TBD	TBD
2026–2028	FIDE Circuit 2026–2027; Top 2 qualified		Candidates Tournament 2028; TBD; 8 player double round-robin tournament	TBD	TBD	TBD
Years	Qualification format	Qualifiers	Candidates Format	Candidates Winner(s)	Seeded in Final	Championship Final

== See also ==
- Development of the Women's World Chess Championship
