= Candidates Tournament 1953 =

1953 chess tournament

Zurich 1953 was a chess tournament won by Vasily Smyslov, held from 29 August to 24 October 1953. It was a Candidates Tournament for the 1954 World Chess Championship, which led to the match between Smyslov and Mikhail Botvinnik. The tournament is famous for the strength of the players, the high quality of the games, and books on the tournament by David Bronstein and Miguel Najdorf that are regarded as among the best tournament books ever written.

The tournament was a double round-robin event. Players were assigned one point for every win and a half-point for each draw. In later years, Bronstein claimed that the Soviet players were accompanied by KGB agents. According to Bronstein, during the tournament, the KGB handlers started to worry that the American candidate, Samuel Reshevsky, would win, and began pressuring some of the Soviet players to draw their games against Smyslov, who was leading the other Soviet players in points.

Bronstein stated that Paul Keres was pressured to draw his Round 24 against Smyslov by the Soviet triumvirate (Postnikov, Igor Bondarevsky, Moshintsev), who had accompanied the players. Bronstein maintains he was told that Efim Geller would lose to him in Round 25, but that Geller had been told that he [Bronstein] had demanded that Geller lose to him. He also wrote that he was told to go to Smyslov's room and prearrange a draw with him for their game in Round 26.

Smyslov responded in an article in the chess magazine 64, stating that Bronstein was trying to "rewrite history". Smyslov wrote that Bronstein was the one who wanted to make a draw with him, for the purpose of securing second place in order to qualify to the 1956 Candidates Tournament.

#	Player	1	2	3	4	5	6	7	8	9	10	11	12	13	14	15	Total
1	Vasily Smyslov (USSR)		½ ½	1 1	½ 1	½ ½	1 1	½ ½	½ 0	½ ½	½ ½	½ ½	½ ½	1 ½	1 1	1 ½	18
2	David Bronstein (USSR)	½ ½		1 ½	1 1	½ ½	½ 0	½ ½	½ ½	1 ½	½ ½	½ ½	0 1	1 ½	½ ½	½ ½	16
3	Paul Keres (USSR)	0 0	0 ½		½ ½	½ 1	½ 1	½ ½	½ ½	½ ½	0 ½	1 1	1 ½	½ 1	½ ½	1 1	16
4	Samuel Reshevsky (USA)	½ 0	0 0	½ ½		½ ½	½ ½	½ ½	1 0	½ ½	½ 1	½1	1½	½ 1	1 1	1 ½	16
5	Tigran Petrosian (USSR)	½ ½	½ ½	½ 0	½ ½		½ ½	0 ½	½ ½	0 0	½ ½	½ ½	1 1	½ 1	1 ½	1 1	15
6	Efim Geller (USSR)	0 0	½ 1	½ 0	½ ½	½ ½		1 1	½ 0	0 1	½ ½	0 1	1 ½	½ 1	0 1	½ ½	14½
7	Miguel Najdorf (Argentina)	½ ½	½ ½	½ ½	½ ½	1 ½	0 0		1 ½	1 ½	½ 0	½ ½	½½	½ ½	0 ½	1 1	14½
8	Alexander Kotov (USSR)	½ 1	½ ½	½ ½	0 1	½ ½	½ 1	0 ½		1 0	1 ½	0 0	1 0	1 ½	0 ½	0 1	14
9	Mark Taimanov (USSR)	½ ½	0 ½	½ ½	½ ½	1 1	1 0	0 ½	0 1		1 0	½ ½	½ ½	½ 0	0 ½	1 1	14
10	Yuri Averbakh (USSR)	½ ½	½ ½	1 ½	0 ½	½ ½	½ ½	1 ½	0 ½	0 1		½ ½	½ ½	0 ½	1 1	0 0	13½
11	Isaac Boleslavsky (USSR)	½ ½	½ ½	0 0	½ 0	½ ½	1 0	½ ½	1 1	½ ½	½ ½		½ 0	½ ½	½ 1	½ ½	13½
12	László Szabó (Hungary)	½ ½	1 0	0 ½	0 ½	0 0	0 ½	½ ½	0 1	½ ½	½ ½	½ 1		1 ½	½ ½	1 ½	13
13	Svetozar Gligorić (Yugoslavia)	0 ½	0 ½	½ 0	½ 0	½ 0	½ 0	½ ½	0 ½	½ 1	1 ½	½ ½	0 ½		½ 1	1 1	12½
14	Max Euwe (Netherlands)	0 0	½ ½	½ ½	0 0	0 ½	1 0	1 ½	1 ½	1 ½	0 0	½ 0	½ ½	½ 0		1 ½	11½
15	Gideon Ståhlberg (Sweden)	0 ½	½ ½	0 0	0 ½	0 0	½ ½	0 0	1 0	0 0	1 1	½ ½	0 ½	0 0	0 ½		8

== See also ==
- Zürich 1934 chess tournament
- Zurich Chess Challenge
