= Candidates Tournament 2014 =

International chess tournament

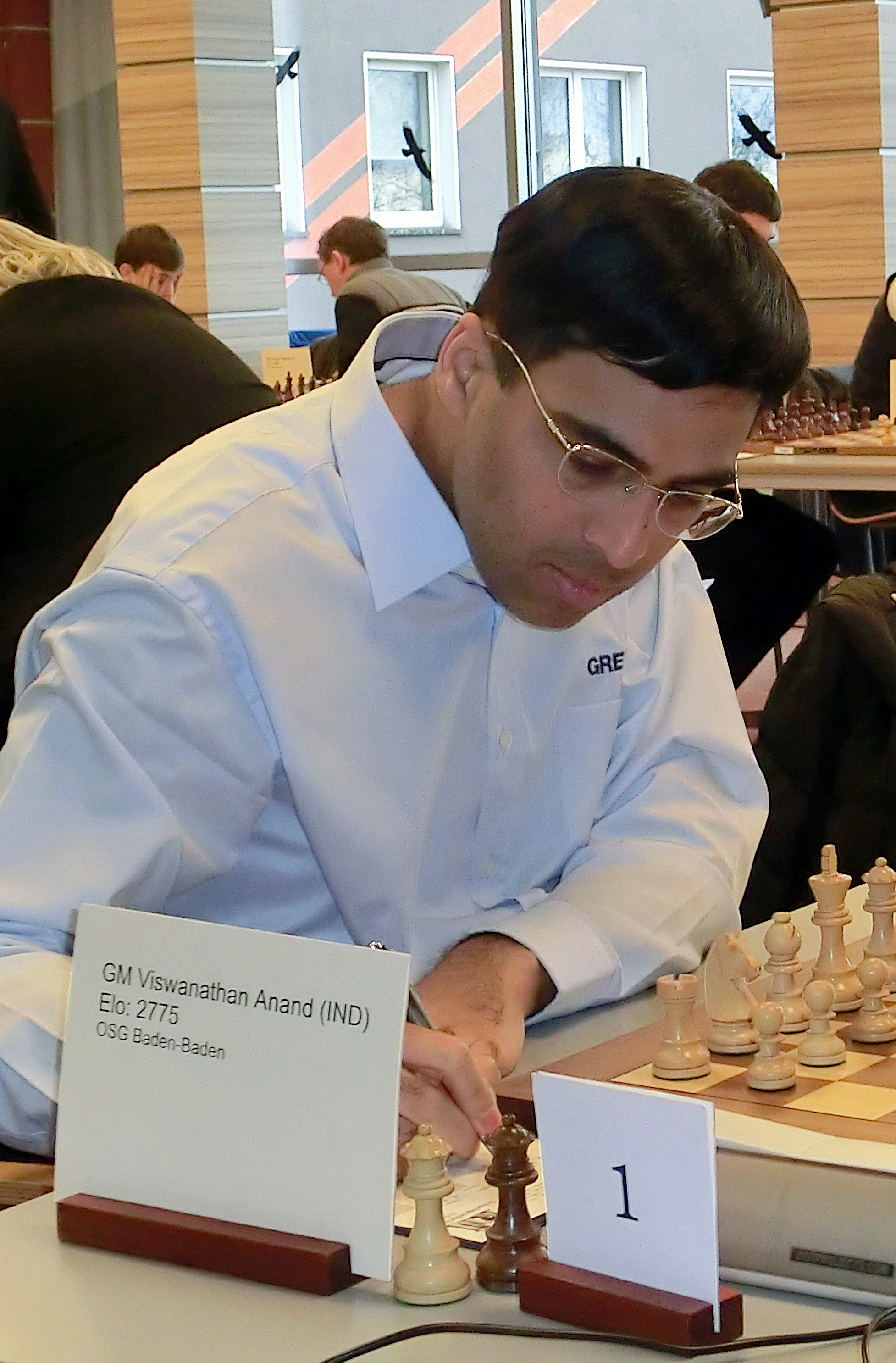
- Viswanathan Anand, the winner of the Candidates Tournament 2014, advanced to the World Chess Championship 2014 match.
- Venue: Yugra Chess Academy
- Location: Khanty-Mansiysk, Russia
- Dates: 13–31 March 2014
- Competitors: 8 from 5 nations
- Winning score: 8.5 points of 14

Champion
- (India) Viswanathan Anand

The Candidates Tournament 2014 was an eight-player double round-robin chess tournament that took place in Khanty-Mansiysk, Russia, from 13 March to 31 March 2014.

== Participants ==
The participants, in order of rules announced by FIDE, were:

| Qualification path | Player | Age | March 2014 rating | World Ranking (March 2014) |
|---|---|---|---|---|
| 2013 World Championship runner-up | (India) Viswanathan Anand | 44 | 2770 | 8 |
| The top two finishers in the Chess World Cup 2013 | (Russia) Vladimir Kramnik | 38 | 2787 | 3 |
| The top two finishers in the Chess World Cup 2013 | (Russia) Dmitry Andreikin | 24 | 2709 | 42 |
| The top two finishers in the FIDE Grand Prix 2012–13 | (Bulgaria) Veselin Topalov | 39 | 2785 | 4 |
| The top two finishers in the FIDE Grand Prix 2012–13 | (Azerbaijan) Shakhriyar Mamedyarov | 28 | 2757 | 13 |
| The next two highest rated players who played in the Chess World Cup 2013 or the FIDE Grand Prix 2012–13 (average FIDE rating on the 12 monthly lists from August 2012 to July 2013) | (Armenia) Levon Aronian | 31 | 2830 | 2 |
| The next two highest rated players who played in the Chess World Cup 2013 or the FIDE Grand Prix 2012–13 (average FIDE rating on the 12 monthly lists from August 2012 to July 2013) | (Russia) Sergey Karjakin | 24 | 2766 | 9 |
| Organizing committee's wild card (FIDE rating in July 2013 at least 2725) | (Russia) Peter Svidler | 37 | 2758 | 11 |

== Prize fund ==
The tournament had a prize fund of €420,000. Prize money was shared between players tied on points; tiebreaks were not used to allocate it. The prizes for each place were as follows:

- 1st place – €95,000
- 2nd place – €88,000
- 3rd place – €75,000
- 4th place – €55,000
- 5th place – €40,000
- 6th place – €28,000
- 7th place – €22,000
- 8th place – €17,000

== Standings ==
Final standings of the 2014 Candidates Tournament
| Rank | Player | Rating March 2014 | 1 (ANA) | | 2 (KAR) | | 3 (KRA) | | 4 (MAM) | | 5 (AND) | | 6 (ARO) | | 7 (SVI) | | 8 (TOP) | | Points | Tiebreaks | | |
| Rank | Player | Rating March 2014 | 1 (ANA) | | 2 (KAR) | | 3 (KRA) | | 4 (MAM) | | 5 (AND) | | 6 (ARO) | | 7 (SVI) | | 8 (TOP) | | Points | H2H | Wins | SB |
|---|---|---|---|---|---|---|---|---|---|---|---|---|---|---|---|---|---|---|---|---|---|---|
| 1 | (India) Viswanathan Anand | 2770 | | | ½ | ½ | ½ | ½ | ½ | 1 | ½ | ½ | 1 | ½ | ½ | ½ | 1 | ½ | 8½ | — | 3 | 57.25 |
| 2 | (Russia) Sergey Karjakin | 2766 | ½ | ½ | | | 1 | 0 | ½ | ½ | ½ | ½ | 0 | 1 | ½ | 1 | ½ | ½ | 7½ | — | 3 | 51.75 |
| 3 | (Russia) Vladimir Kramnik | 2787 | ½ | ½ | 1 | 0 | | | 1 | ½ | ½ | ½ | ½ | ½ | 0 | ½ | 1 | 0 | 7 | 2½ | 3 | 49.25 |
| 4 | (Azerbaijan) Shakhriyar Mamedyarov | 2757 | 0 | ½ | ½ | ½ | ½ | 0 | | | 1 | ½ | 1 | 0 | 1 | ½ | ½ | ½ | 7 | 2 | 3 | 48.00 |
| 5 | (Russia) Dmitry Andreikin | 2709 | ½ | ½ | ½ | ½ | ½ | ½ | ½ | 0 | | | 1 | ½ | ½ | 0 | 1 | ½ | 7 | 1½ | 2 | 48.50 |
| 6 | (Armenia) Levon Aronian | 2830 | ½ | 0 | 0 | 1 | ½ | ½ | 1 | 0 | ½ | 0 | | | 1 | ½ | ½ | ½ | 6½ | 1½ | 3 | 45.00 |
| 7 | (Russia) Peter Svidler | 2758 | ½ | ½ | 0 | ½ | ½ | 1 | ½ | 0 | 1 | ½ | ½ | 0 | | | 1 | 0 | 6½ | ½ | 3 | 46.00 |
| 8 | (Bulgaria) Veselin Topalov | 2785 | ½ | 0 | ½ | ½ | 1 | 0 | ½ | ½ | ½ | 0 | ½ | ½ | 1 | 0 | | | 6 | — | 2 | 42.25 |

In the event of a tie, the following tie-break methods were used, in order of precedence:

1. Head-to-head scores between the tied players;
2. Highest number of wins;
3. The player with the highest Sonneborn–Berger score;
4. Rapid chess play-offs.

== Results by round ==
Pairings and results Numbers in parentheses indicate players' scores prior to the round.

Round 1 – 13 March 2014
| Dmitry Andreikin | Vladimir Kramnik | ½–½ | E32 Nimzo-Indian, Classical |
| Sergey Karjakin | Peter Svidler | ½–½ | B48 Sicilian, Taimanov |
| Shakhriyar Mamedyarov | Veselin Topalov | ½–½ | D11 Slav Accepted |
| Viswanathan Anand | Levon Aronian | 1–0 | C88 Ruy Lopez |
Round 2 – 14 March 2014
| Vladimir Kramnik (½) | Sergey Karjakin (½) | 1–0 | D20 Queen's Gambit Accepted |
| Peter Svidler (½) | Dmitry Andreikin (½) | 1–0 | B32 Sicilian Defence |
| Veselin Topalov (½) | Viswanathan Anand (1) | ½–½ | A11 English Opening |
| Levon Aronian (0) | Shakhriyar Mamedyarov (½) | 1–0 | D38 Queen's Gambit Declined |
Round 3 – 15 March 2014
| Dmitry Andreikin (½) | Sergey Karjakin (½) | ½–½ | C65 Ruy Lopez, Berlin Defence |
| Peter Svidler (1½) | Vladimir Kramnik (1½) | ½–½ | A35 English, Symmetrical |
| Veselin Topalov (1) | Levon Aronian (1) | ½–½ | C88 Ruy Lopez |
| Shakhriyar Mamedyarov (½) | Viswanathan Anand (1½) | 0–1 | D11 Slav Accepted |
Round 4 – 17 March 2014
| Shakhriyar Mamedyarov (½) | Dmitry Andreikin (1) | 1–0 | D45 Queen's Gambit Declined Semi-Slav |
| Sergey Karjakin (1) | Veselin Topalov (1½) | ½–½ | A29 English, Four Knights, Kingside Fianchetto |
| Levon Aronian (1½) | Peter Svidler (2) | 1–0 | D85 Grünfeld, Exchange |
| Viswanathan Anand (2½) | Vladimir Kramnik (2) | ½–½ | D37 Queen's Gambit Declined |
Round 5 – 18 March 2014
| Dmitry Andreikin (1) | Viswanathan Anand (3) | ½–½ | C65 Ruy Lopez, Berlin Defence |
| Sergey Karjakin (1½) | Shakhriyar Mamedyarov (1½) | ½–½ | B52 Sicilian Defence, Canal-Sokolsky Attack |
| Peter Svidler (2) | Veselin Topalov (2) | 1–0 | C78 Ruy Lopez |
| Vladimir Kramnik (2½) | Levon Aronian (2½) | ½–½ | E10 Queen's Pawn Game |
Round 6 – 19 March 2014
| Levon Aronian (3) | Dmitry Andreikin (1½) | ½–½ | A12 English, Caro-Kann Defensive System |
| Viswanathan Anand (3½) | Sergey Karjakin (2) | ½–½ | C67 Ruy Lopez, Berlin Defence, Open Variation |
| Shakhriyar Mamedyarov (2) | Peter Svidler (3) | 1–0 | A81 Dutch Defence |
| Veselin Topalov (2) | Vladimir Kramnik (3) | 1–0 | D37 Queen's Gambit Declined |
Round 7 – 21 March 2014
| Sergey Karjakin (2½) | Levon Aronian (3½) | 0–1 | C65 Ruy Lopez, Berlin Defence |
| Peter Svidler (3) | Viswanathan Anand (4) | ½–½ | C65 Ruy Lopez, Berlin Defence |
| Vladimir Kramnik (3) | Shakhriyar Mamedyarov (3) | 1–0 | D38 Queen's Gambit Declined |
| Dmitry Andreikin (2) | Veselin Topalov (3) | 1–0 | D30 Queen's Gambit Declined |

Round 8 – 22 March 2014
| Vladimir Kramnik (4) | Dmitry Andreikin (3) | ½–½ | D15 Queen's Gambit Declined Slav |
| Peter Svidler (3½) | Sergey Karjakin (2½) | 0–1 | A05 Réti Opening |
| Veselin Topalov (3) | Shakhriyar Mamedyarov (3) | ½–½ | B90 Sicilian Defence, Najdorf Variation |
| Levon Aronian (4½) | Viswanathan Anand (4½) | ½–½ | A11 English, Caro-Kann Defensive System |
Round 9 – 23 March 2014
| Sergey Karjakin (3½) | Vladimir Kramnik (4½) | 1–0 | D02 Queen's Pawn Game |
| Dmitry Andreikin (3½) | Peter Svidler (3½) | ½–½ | B90 Sicilian Defence, Najdorf Variation |
| Viswanathan Anand (5) | Veselin Topalov (3½) | 1–0 | B90 Sicilian Defence, Najdorf Variation |
| Shakhriyar Mamedyarov (3½) | Levon Aronian (5) | 1–0 | E20 Nimzo-Indian |
Round 10 – 25 March 2014
| Sergey Karjakin (4½) | Dmitry Andreikin (4) | ½–½ | B46 Sicilian Defence, Taimanov Variation |
| Vladimir Kramnik (4½) | Peter Svidler (4) | 0–1 | A80 Dutch Defense |
| Levon Aronian (5) | Veselin Topalov (3½) | ½–½ | D15 Queen's Gambit Declined Slav |
| Viswanathan Anand (6) | Shakhriyar Mamedyarov (4½) | ½–½ | B90 Sicilian Defence, Najdorf Variation |
Round 11 – 26 March 2014
| Dmitry Andreikin (4½) | Shakhriyar Mamedyarov (5) | ½–½ | E04 Catalan Opening, Open, 5. Nf3 |
| Veselin Topalov (4) | Sergey Karjakin (5) | ½–½ | A30 English, Symmetrical |
| Peter Svidler (5) | Levon Aronian (5½) | ½–½ | A07 King's Indian Attack |
| Vladimir Kramnik (4½) | Viswanathan Anand (6½) | ½–½ | E06 Catalan Opening, Closed, 5.Nf3 |
Round 12 – 27 March 2014
| Viswanathan Anand (7) | Dmitry Andreikin (5) | ½–½ | B18 Caro-Kann, Classical |
| Shakhriyar Mamedyarov (5½) | Sergey Karjakin (5½) | ½–½ | E20 Nimzo-Indian |
| Veselin Topalov (4½) | Peter Svidler (5½) | 1–0 | B49 Sicilian Defence, Taimanov Variation |
| Levon Aronian (6) | Vladimir Kramnik (5) | ½–½ | D36 Queen's Gambit Declined |
Round 13 – 29 March 2014
| Dmitry Andreikin (5½) | Levon Aronian (6½) | 1–0 | A45 Trompowsky Attack |
| Sergey Karjakin (6) | Viswanathan Anand (7½) | ½–½ | D36 Queen's Gambit Declined |
| Peter Svidler (5½) | Shakhriyar Mamedyarov (6) | ½–½ | B90 Sicilian Defence, Najdorf Variation |
| Vladimir Kramnik (5½) | Veselin Topalov (5½) | 1–0 | D43 Queen's Gambit Declined Semi-Slav |
Round 14 – 30 March 2014
| Levon Aronian (6½) | Sergey Karjakin (6½) | 0–1 | B23 Sicilian Defence, Closed |
| Viswanathan Anand (8) | Peter Svidler (6) | ½–½ | C89 Ruy Lopez, Marshall Attack |
| Shakhriyar Mamedyarov (6½) | Vladimir Kramnik (6½) | ½–½ | E32 Nimzo-Indian, Classical |
| Veselin Topalov (5½) | Dmitry Andreikin (6½) | ½–½ | C65 Ruy Lopez, Berlin Defence |

=== Points by round ===
For each player, the difference between wins and losses after each round is shown. The players with the highest difference for each round are marked with green background.

| Final place | Player \ Round | 1 | 2 | 3 | 4 | 5 | 6 | 7 | 8 | 9 | 10 | 11 | 12 | 13 | 14 |
|---|---|---|---|---|---|---|---|---|---|---|---|---|---|---|---|
| 1 | Viswanathan Anand (IND) | +1 | +1 | +2 | +2 | +2 | +2 | +2 | +2 | +3 | +3 | +3 | +3 | +3 | +3 |
| 2 | Sergey Karjakin (RUS) | = | –1 | –1 | –1 | –1 | –1 | –2 | –1 | = | = | = | = | = | +1 |
| 3 | Vladimir Kramnik (RUS) | = | +1 | +1 | +1 | +1 | = | +1 | +1 | = | –1 | –1 | –1 | = | = |
| 4 | Shakhriyar Mamedyarov (AZE) | = | –1 | –2 | –1 | –1 | = | –1 | –1 | = | = | = | = | = | = |
| 5 | Dmitry Andreikin (RUS) | = | –1 | –1 | –2 | –2 | –2 | –1 | –1 | –1 | –1 | –1 | –1 | = | = |
| 6 | Levon Aronian (ARM) | –1 | = | = | +1 | +1 | +1 | +2 | +2 | +1 | +1 | +1 | +1 | = | –1 |
| 7 | Peter Svidler (RUS) | = | +1 | +1 | = | +1 | = | = | –1 | –1 | = | = | –1 | –1 | –1 |
| 8 | Veselin Topalov (BUL) | = | = | = | = | –1 | = | –1 | –1 | –2 | –2 | –2 | –1 | –2 | –2 |
