= Candidates Tournament 1956 =

1956 chess tournament

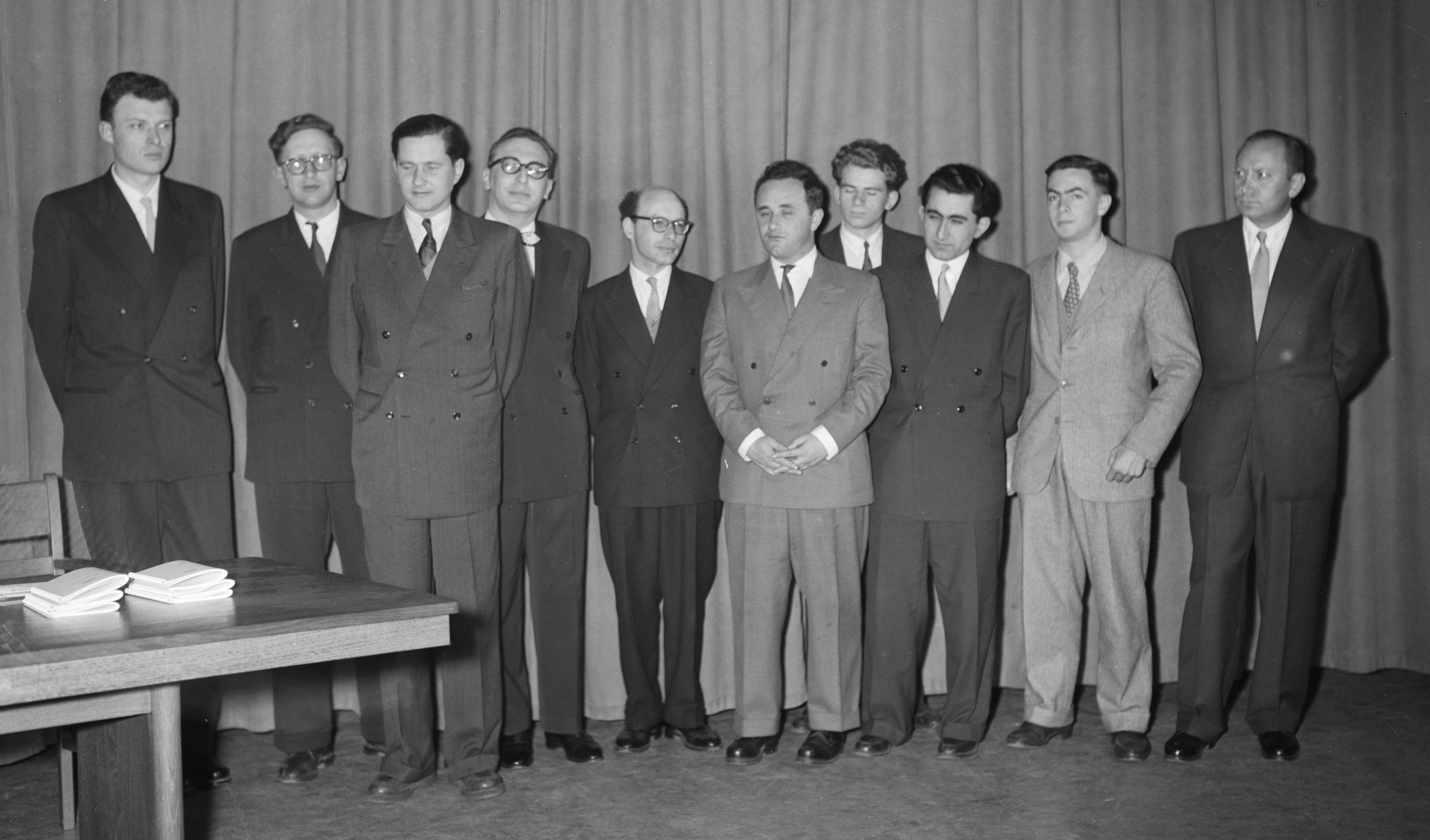
Candidates Tournament 1956 Amsterdam

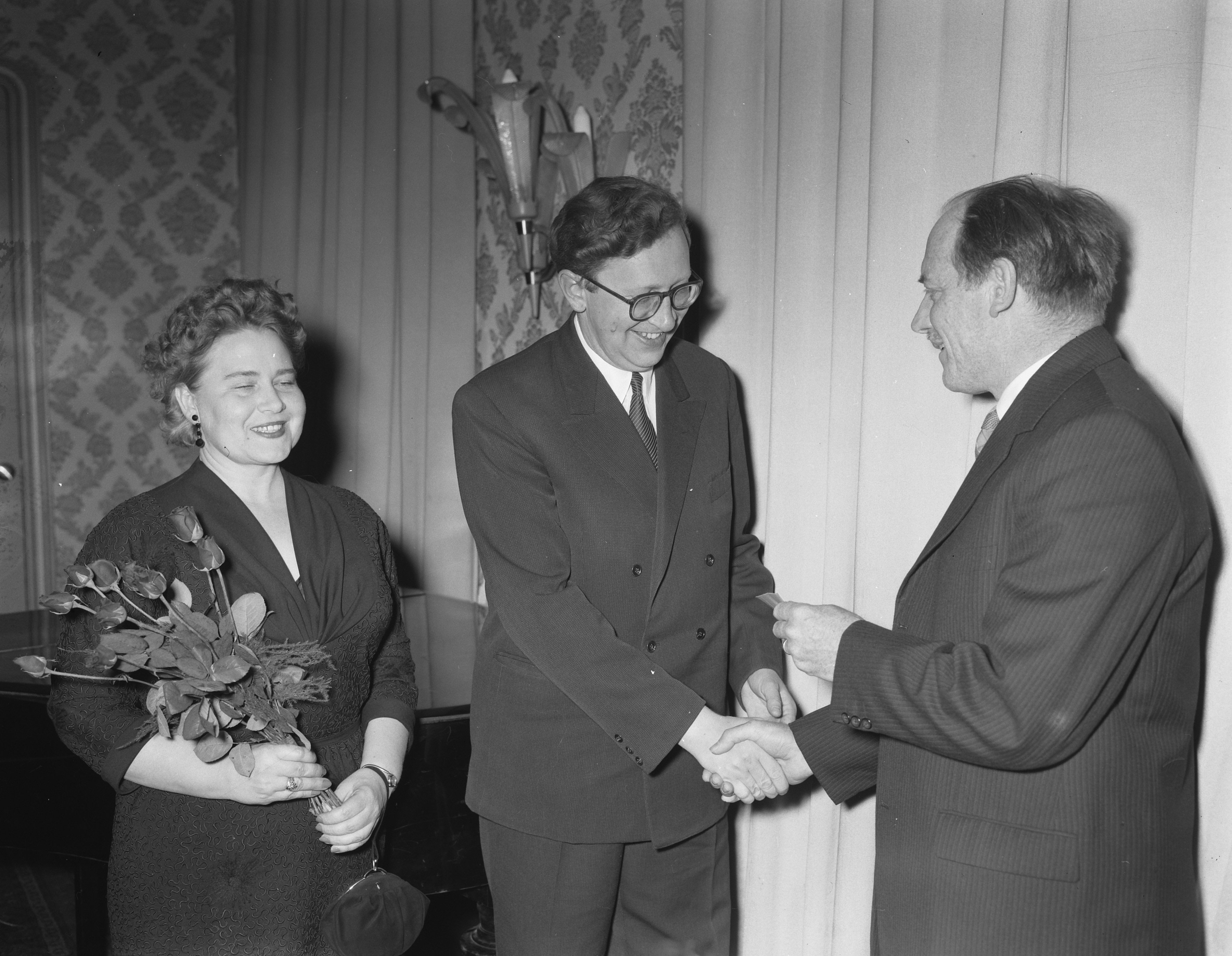
Smyslov (1956)

Amsterdam 1956 was a chess tournament won by Vasily Smyslov. It was the Candidates Tournament for the 1957 World Chess Championship match between Smyslov and Mikhail Botvinnik.

#	Player	1	2	3	4	5	6	7	8	9	10	Total
1	Vasily Smyslov (USSR)	xx	½½	½½	0½	½½	½1	11	½1	1½	½1	11½
2	Paul Keres (USSR)	½½	xx	½½	½½	½½	½1	½½	½0	1½	1½	10
3	Laszlo Szabo (Hungary)	½½	½½	xx	1½	½½	½½	½1	0½	½½	01	9½
4	Boris Spassky (USSR)	1½	½½	0½	xx	½½	½1	0½	½½	½½	½1	9½
5	Tigran Petrosian (USSR)	½½	½½	½½	½½	xx	0½	01	1½	½½	1½	9½
6	David Bronstein (USSR)	½0	½0	½½	½0	1½	xx	½1	1½	½½	½1	9½
7	Efim Geller (USSR)	00	½½	½0	1½	10	½0	xx	11	½1	1½	9½
8	Dr. Miroslav Filip (Czechoslovakia)	½0	½1	1½	½½	0½	0½	00	xx	10	½1	8
9	Oscar Panno (Argentina)	0½	0½	½½	½½	½½	½½	½0	01	xx	1½	8
10	Hermann Pilnik (Argentina)	½0	0½	10	½0	0½	½0	0½	½0	0½	xx	5
