= Samuel Reshevsky =

Polish-American chess grandmaster (1911–1992)

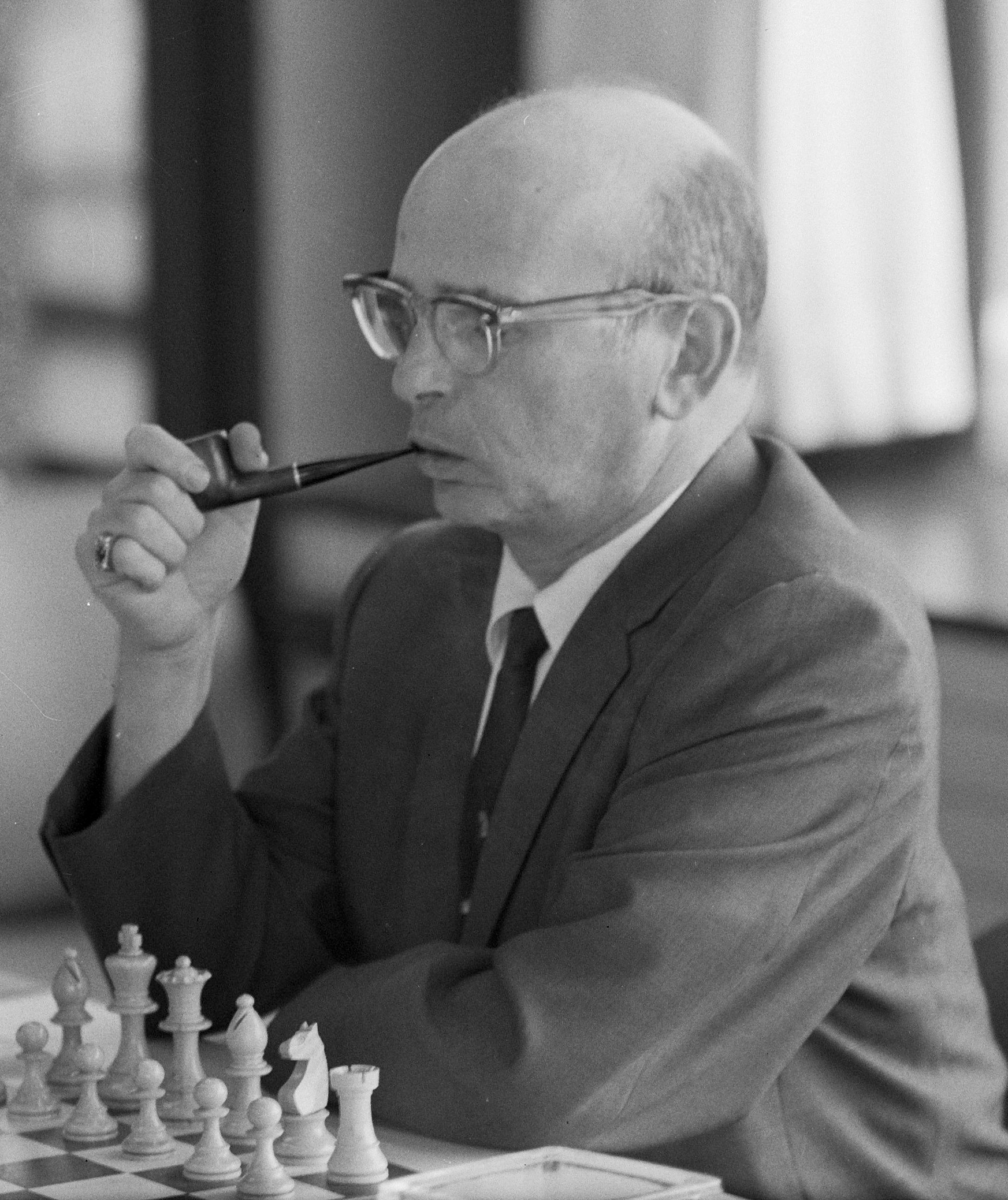
- Reshevsky in 1964

Personal information
- Full name: Samuel Herman Reshevsky
- Born: Szmul Rzeszewski; November 26, 1911 Ozorków, Congress Poland, Russian Empire
- Died: April 4, 1992 (aged 80) New York City, U.S.

Chess career
- Country: United States (after 1929); Poland (before 1929)
- Title: Grandmaster (1950)
- Peak rating: 2565 (July 1972)
- Peak ranking: No. 25 (July 1972)

Samuel Herman Reshevsky (born Szmul Rzeszewski; November 26, 1911 – April 4, 1992) was a Polish chess prodigy and later a leading American chess grandmaster. He was a contender for the World Chess Championship from the mid-1930s to the late 1960s. He tied for third place in the 1948 World Chess Championship tournament, tied for second in the 1953 Candidates tournament, and was a Candidate as late as 1968. He was a seven-time winner of the US Chess Championship.

He was an accountant by profession, and also a chess writer.

== Early life, early chess exhibition and competition ==
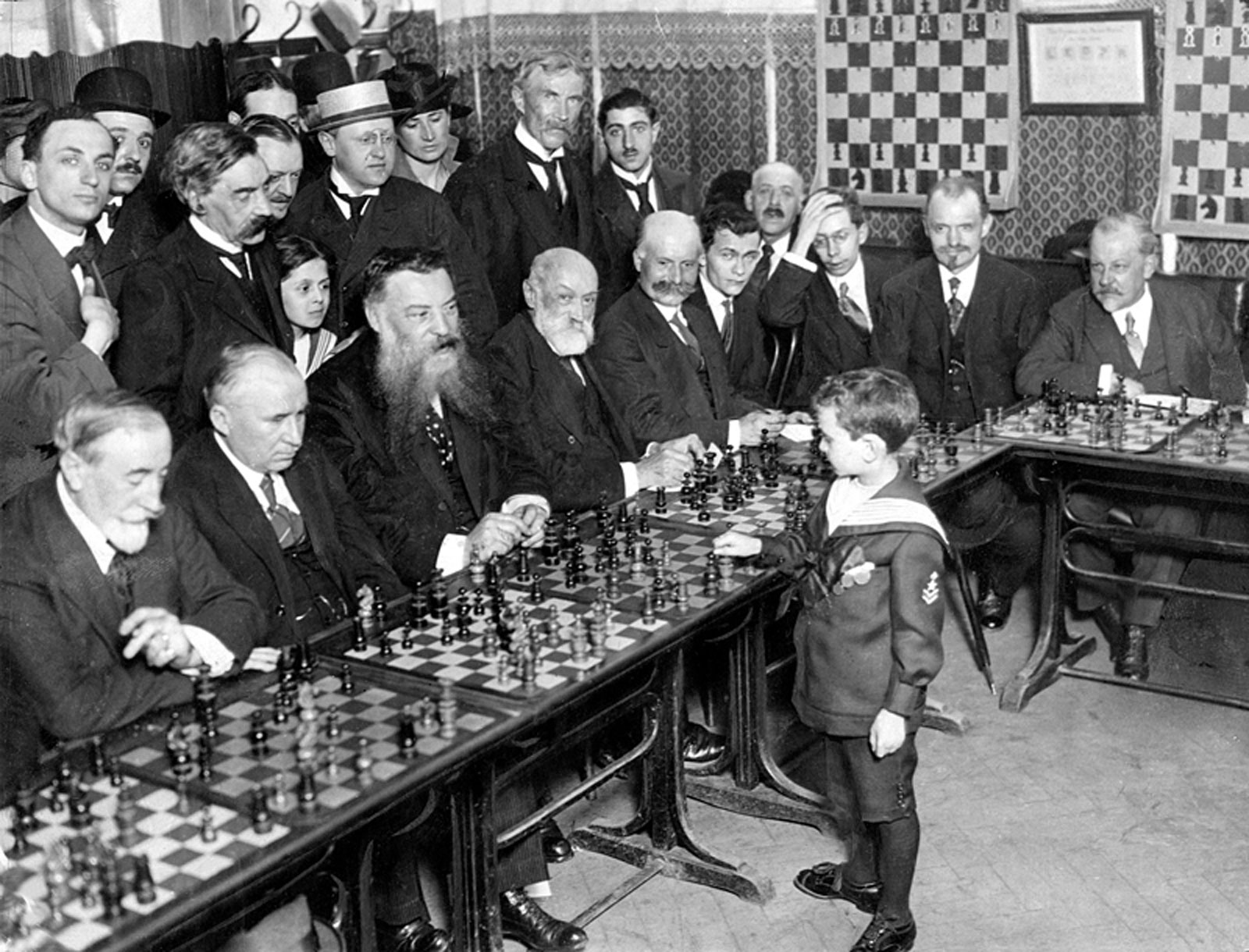
Reshevsky in 1920 (at age eight) giving a simultaneous chess exhibition in Paris; he won all games.

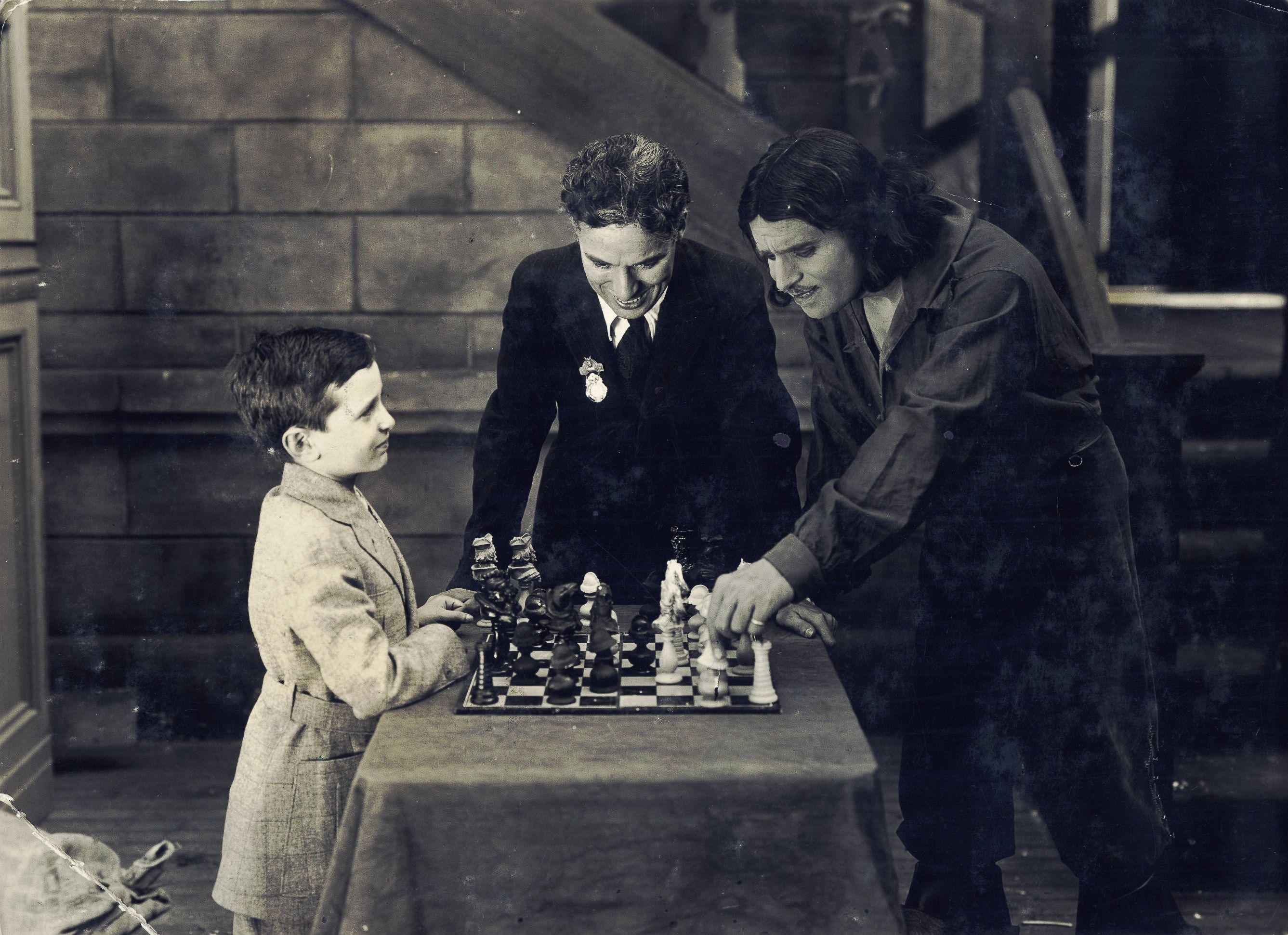
Reshevsky playing chess with Douglas Fairbanks as Charlie Chaplin watches them during filming of the American silent film The Three Musketeers in 1921

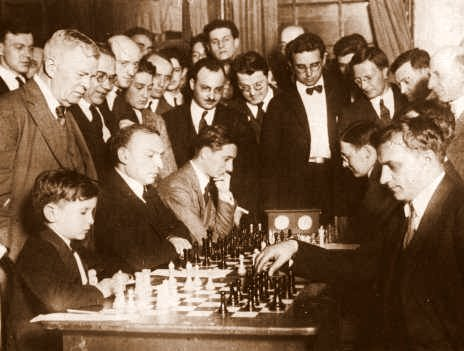
Reshevsky playing chess in 1922

Reshevsky was born at Ozorków near Łódź, Congress Poland, to a Jewish family. He learned to play chess at age four and was soon acclaimed as a child prodigy. At age eight, he was beating many accomplished players with ease and giving simultaneous exhibitions.

In November 1920, his parents moved to the United States to make a living by publicly exhibiting their child's talent. Reshevsky played thousands of games in exhibitions all over the US. He played in the 1922 New York Masters tournament; at that stage, he was likely the youngest player ever to have competed in a strong tournament; in it, he defeated former World Championship match contender David Janowski.

For a period in his youth, Reshevsky did not attend school, for which his parents appeared in District Court in Manhattan, facing a charge of improper guardianship. However, Julius Rosenwald, wealthy co-owner of Sears, Roebuck and Company in Chicago, soon afterward became Reshevsky's benefactor, and he guaranteed Reshevsky's future on the condition that he would complete his education.

Reshevsky never became a truly professional chess player. He gave up most competitive chess for seven years, from 1924 to 1931, to complete his secondary education while successfully competing in occasional events during this period.

Reshevsky graduated from the University of Chicago in 1934 with a degree in accounting, and supported himself and his family by working as an accountant. He moved to New York City and lived there or in its suburbs for the remainder of his life. He and his wife, Norma Mindick, had three children. As a religious Jew, Reshevsky would not play on the Sabbath or on the major Jewish festivals; his games were scheduled accordingly.

== Death ==
Reshevsky died April 4, 1992, in Suffern, New York, of a heart attack.

== Chess career ==
=== American results ===
Reshevsky won the US Open Chess Championship in 1931 at Tulsa; this event was known as the Western Open at the time. He shared the 1934 US Open title with Reuben Fine at Chicago.

Reshevsky won the US Chess Championship in 1936, 1938, 1940, 1941, 1942, 1946, and 1969. He also tied for first in 1972 but lost the playoff in 1973 to Robert Byrne. He competed in a record 21 US Championships and achieved a plus score every time except for 1966–1967, when he scored just 4½/11. He also holds US Championship records for most finishes in the top three places (15), most games played (269), and most games won (127).

=== International results ===
Reshevsky's international career began in 1935 with a trip to England, where he won at Great Yarmouth with 10/11. He then won first place at the Margate tournament, where he beat, among others, former world champion José Raúl Capablanca; the game followed the Exchange Variation of the Queen's Gambit Declined. The game score follows:

Reshevsky vs. Capablanca, 1935

Position: e7 white rook, f7 black rook, g7 black king, h7 black pawn, e6 white queen, g6 black pawn, f5 black rook, d4 white pawn, f4 white pawn, b3 white rook, c3 white knight, e3 white pawn, d2 white king, f1 black queen

Final position after 56.Kd2

Reshevsky vs. Capablanca, Margate 1935
1.d4 Nf6 2.c4 e6 3.Nc3 d5 4.Bg5 Nbd7 5.cxd5 exd5 6.e3 Be7 7.Bd3 0-0 8.Qc2 c5 9.Nf3 c4 10.Bf5 Re8 11.0-0 g6 12.Bh3 Nf8 13.Bxc8 Rxc8 14.Bxf6 Bxf6 15.b3 Qa5 16.b4 Qd8 17.Qa4 a6 18.b5 Re6 19.Rab1 Rb8 20.Rb2 Be7 21.bxa6 Rxa6 22.Qc2 Ne6 23.Rfb1 Ra7 24.a4 Nc7 25.Ne5 Qe8 26.f4 f6 27.Ng4 Qd7 28.h3 Kg7 29.Nf2 Ba3 30.Ra2 Bd6 31.Nfd1 f5 32.Nb5 Ra5 33.Nxc7 Bxc7 34.Nc3 Qd6 35.Qf2 b6 36.Qf3 Rd8 37.Rab2 Qe7 38.Rb4 Rd7 39.Kh1 Bd8 40.g4 fxg4 41.hxg4 Qd6 42.Kg1 Bc7 43.Kf2 Rf7 44.g5 Bd8 45.Ke2 Bxg5 46.Rxb6 Qa3 47.Kd2 Be7 48.Rb7 Rxa4 49.Qxd5 Ra5 50.Qxc4 Rh5 51.Kd3 Qa8 52.Qe6 Qa3 53.Rd7 Rhf5 54.Rb3 Qa1 55.Rxe7 Qf1+ 56.Kd2 1–0

A year later Reshevsky shared third place at the Nottingham 1936 chess tournament. In 1937 he shared first at Kemeri, Latvia, and in 1938 shared fourth in the famous AVRO tournament in the Netherlands, which featured arguably the eight strongest players in the world. Reshevsky won his third US Open title at Boston 1944.

Reshevsky was a serious contender for the World Championship from roughly 1935 to the late 1960s. He was one of five chess grandmasters to compete in the World Championship match tournament in The Hague/Moscow 1948 and finished in joint third place with Paul Keres, behind Mikhail Botvinnik and Vasily Smyslov. This tournament was organized because World Champion Alexander Alekhine had died in 1946 while holding the title, which was an unprecedented situation.

In 1950, Reshevsky was awarded the title of International Grandmaster by FIDE, the World Chess Federation, on its inaugural list. Although eligible, he did not play in the Candidates Tournament in Budapest. It has generally been believed that he was barred from attending by the US State Department due to the Cold War. The only other eligible active player from a NATO country, Max Euwe of the Netherlands, also did not play. In 1991, however, Reshevsky said the decision not to go was his.

The following Candidates in Zurich 1953 tournament was probably Reshevsky's best chance to qualify for a World Championship match, but he finished in joint second place with David Bronstein and Keres, two points behind Smyslov. Bronstein, in his last book, Secret Notes, published in 2007 just after his death the previous year, confirmed long-standing rumours by writing that the nine Soviet grandmasters (out of a field of 15 players) at Zurich were under orders from both their chess leadership and the KGB not to let Reshevsky win the tournament under any circumstances, with Smyslov being the preferred victor. Bronstein claims that when Reshevsky maintained his strong contention late into the two-month event, the Soviets prearranged several results in games amongst themselves to successfully prevent Reshevsky's overall victory, while also ensuring that Reshevsky faced the maximum test in his own games against the Soviet players. Bronstein had earlier (1995) written that he was ordered by the Soviet delegation leader to win as Black against Reshevsky in the second cycle at Zurich and managed to do so after a very hard struggle. Several other writers, including GM Alexei Suetin (who was the second of Tigran Petrosian at Zurich 1953), also confirmed the Soviet collusion in Zurich.

Reshevsky qualified for one more Candidates in 1967 but lost the subsequent quarterfinal match to Viktor Korchnoi the following year.

=== Olympiad results ===
Reshevsky competed eight times for the US at the Chess Olympiads, six times on board one, over a 37-year span, helping the US team to win the gold in 1937 and bronze in 1974, and winning an individual bronze medal for his performance on board one in 1950. His complete results were (+39−12=49) in 100 games, for 63.5 percent. He played at Stockholm 1937, Dubrovnik 1950, Helsinki 1952, Munich 1958, Tel Aviv 1964, Lugano 1968, Siegen 1970, and Nice 1974.

== Match player ==
In 1952, New York hosted the first eight games of an informal match for "The Championship of the Free World" between Reshevsky and Polish-Argentine grandmaster Miguel Najdorf. An additional five games were played in Mexico City and five more in San Salvador. Reshevsky won the match, 11–7. The following year a rematch took place in Buenos Aires. Reshevsky again won, 9½–8½.

In his long career, Reshevsky proved a formidable match player. In 1941, he defeated I. A. Horowitz in a US Championship playoff match by (+3−0=13). In 1942, he defeated Isaac Kashdan by (+6−2=3). In 1952, he defeated Svetozar Gligorić by (+2−1=7). In 1956, he defeated William Lombardy by (+1−0=5). In 1957, he defeated Arthur Bisguier by (+4−2=4). In 1957, he defeated Donald Byrne by (+7−3=0). In 1960, he defeated Pal Benko by (+3−2=5).

Reshevsky lost his first match in 1964, but it was a four-game playoff match following the Amsterdam 1964 Interzonal, where he had tied for 8th–9th with the Hungarian Champion Lajos Portisch. The final spot for advancement to the Candidates Match was at stake and there was little time between the end of the Interzonal and the start of the match. Reshevsky's earlier matches had always had a lead time of several months, which allowed him to prepare his openings, but he proved to be at a distinct disadvantage in this area against Portisch, who was a full-time chess professional and always excellent in his opening preparation. Reshevsky was quickly outplayed on the White side of the Queen's Gambit Accepted in the first game and eventually fell on time in a lost position. In the second game, he played sharply with Black, but Portisch was able to exchange the queens and a pair of rooks, thus draining much of the tension in the position. A draw by threefold repetition of position soon ensued. In his last game with White, Reshevsky had to go for broke. An Open Sicilian arose, but Portisch seized the initiative on the queenside; having gained a clear advantage, he was able to translate it into a crushing kingside attack, thus winning the match and the final Candidates spot. Amsterdam 1964 was the first meeting between these two chess greats, and Portisch was to prove a difficult opponent for Reshevsky, whose lifetime score against him was (+0−4=9).

Reshevsky played on top board for the US in the 1955 team match against the USSR, held in Moscow, and defeated reigning World Champion Mikhail Botvinnik over four games, winning one and drawing three.

== Rivalry with Bobby Fischer ==
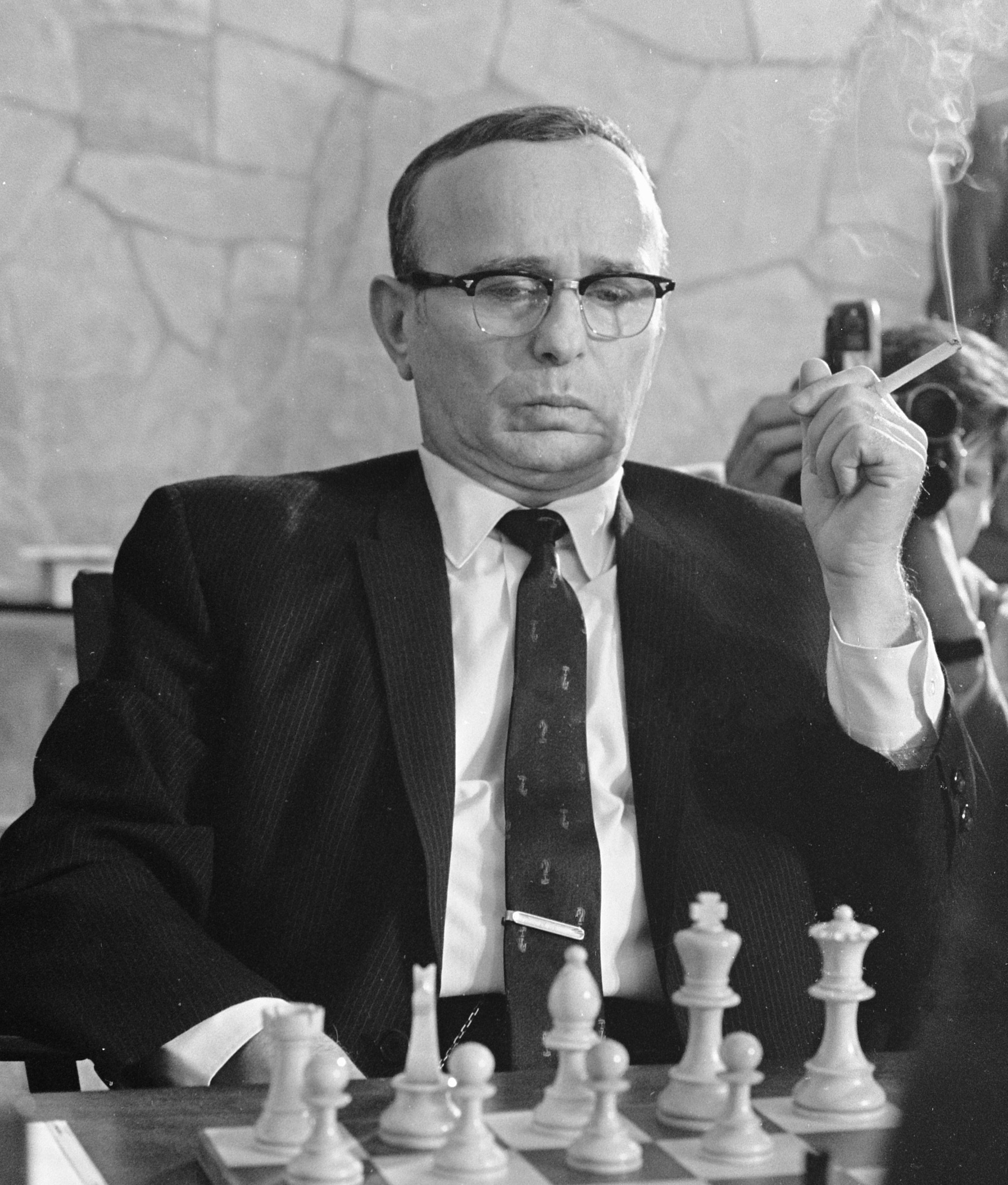
Reshevsky in 1968

Once Bobby Fischer made his debut at age 14 in the US Championship with the 1957–1958 event, he dominated completely, winning on each of his eight attempts, leaving Reshevsky, the seven-time former champion, back in the chasing pack. There was little love lost between the two players, separated by over 30 years in age. Ahead of the Buenos Aires 1960 tournament, Reshevsky reportedly said, "I would settle for 19th place – if Fischer placed 20th." Reshevsky in fact won the Buenos Aires 1960 tournament, with Fischer well back; this was the only time Reshevsky finished ahead of Fischer in an international tournament.

In 1961 Reshevsky began a 16-game match with the then-current US Champion Fischer; it was jointly staged in New York and Los Angeles. Despite Fischer's recent meteoric rise, consensus opinion favored Reshevsky. After eleven games and a tie score (two wins apiece with seven draws), the match ended due to a scheduling dispute between Fischer and match organizer Jacqueline Piatigorsky, with Reshevsky receiving the winner's share of the prize fund.

In the 1967 Sousse Interzonal, Fischer turned up 53 minutes late (only seven minutes short of an automatic time forfeiture) for his game with Reshevsky, and made his opening move without a word of apology. Reshevsky, who had been convinced that Fischer had withdrawn from the tournament, lost the game badly and complained furiously to the organizers. Despite losing that game, Reshevsky advanced to the next stage. Reshevsky also refused to play for the US team in the Chess Olympiads of 1960, 1962 and 1966 because Fischer, as US champion, was chosen ahead of him for the top board. He did, however, finally consent to play on a lower board in 1970, the only time the two men appeared in the same team.

Although Reshevsky and Fischer had one of the fiercest rivalries in chess history, Fischer greatly respected the older champion, stating in the late 1960s that he thought Reshevsky was the strongest player in the world in the mid-1950s. This was around the time when Reshevsky defeated World Champion Mikhail Botvinnik in their four-game mini-match, which was the top board of the US vs. USSR team match held in Moscow.

During his long chess career, Reshevsky played eleven of the first twelve world champions, from Emanuel Lasker to Anatoly Karpov, the only player to do so (he met Garry Kasparov but never played him). He defeated seven world champions: Lasker, José Raúl Capablanca, Alexander Alekhine, Max Euwe, Mikhail Botvinnik, Vasily Smyslov, and Bobby Fischer.

== Important tournament titles ==
Aside from US Championships, Reshevsky's important tournament titles included: Syracuse 1934, Hastings 1937–1938, Leningrad/Moscow 1939, Hollywood 1945 (Pan American Championship), New York 1951 (Maurice Wertheim Memorial), Havana 1952, New York 1956 (Lessing Rosenwald Trophy), Dallas 1957, Haifa/Tel Aviv 1958, Buenos Aires 1960, Netanya 1969, Reykjavík Open 1984, at age 72.

Reshevsky competed seriously at least semi-regularly, virtually until his death in New York City in 1992. He defeated old rival Vasily Smyslov in a tournament game in 1991.

== Style ==
Reshevsky was a tough and forceful player who was superb at positional play but could also play brilliant tactical chess when warranted. He often used huge amounts of time in the opening, which sometimes forced him to play the rest of the game in a very short amount of time. That sometimes unsettled Reshevsky's opponents, but at other times resulted in blunders on his part. Reshevsky's inadequate study of the opening and his related tendency to fall into time pressure may have been the reasons that, despite his great talent, he never became world champion; he himself acknowledged this in his book on chess upsets. This shortcoming was similarly noted by GM Larry Evans in commentary contained in Fischer's book My 60 Memorable Games.

Reshevsky specialized in closed openings with the white pieces, usually opening with 1.d4, and was a virtuoso with the Exchange Variation of the Queen's Gambit Declined. He rarely opened with 1.e4 against strong opposition. With the black pieces, he employed a broad and varied repertoire during his long career.

Contemporary American GM Arnold Denker complimented Reshevsky's extraordinary tenacity and fighting spirit and noted that Reshevsky developed a vital advantage in his great head-to-head battles with his main American rival, GM Reuben Fine, particularly in US Championships from the mid-1930s through the early 1940s. Trouble in games against Reshevsky was the main reason Fine was never able to win the US Championship.

== Writings ==
Reshevsky's books include Reshevsky on Chess (1948), How Chess Games Are Won (1962), Great Chess Upsets (1976), and The Art of Positional Play (1978), as well as an account of the 1972 World Championship match between his great rival Bobby Fischer and Boris Spassky. He also wrote articles on chess for American Chess Bulletin, Chess Life and Chess Review magazines, and for The New York Times.

=== Books by Reshevsky ===
- Learn Chess Fast!, ISBN 4-87187-865-1
- The Art of Positional Play in Chess, ISBN 4-87187-459-1
- Great Chess Upsets, ISBN 4-87187-510-5
- First Piatigorsky Cup International Grandmaster Chess Tournament, ISBN 4-87187-843-0
- Reshevsky on Chess: The U.S. Champion Tells How He Wins, ISBN 978-4871875356
- How Chess Games Are Won
- Reshevsky's Best Games of Chess
- Reshevsky on the Fischer-Spassky Games

== Quotes ==
- "By playing slowly during the early phases of a game I am able to grasp the basic requirements of each position. Then, despite being in time pressure, I have no difficulty in finding the best continuation. Incidentally, it is an odd fact that more often than not it is my opponent who gets the jitters when I am compelled to make these hurried moves."
- His self-description, "My style is somewhere between that of Tal and Petrosian", is sometimes circulated as an ironic comment (given that these two players are considered to represent opposite extremes of style) but makes more sense in its full context; from his book Great Chess Upsets :
  I am essentially a positional player, although I can conduct an assault with precision and vigor, when the opportunity arises. My style lies between that of Tal and Petrosian. It is neither over-aggressive nor too passive. My strength consists of a fighting spirit, a great desire to win, and a stubborn defense whenever in trouble. I rarely become discouraged in an inferior situation, and I fear no one.

== Notable games ==
Chessgames.com 10 game list.

- Reshevsky vs. Capablanca, 1935 1–0
- Lasker vs. Reshevsky, 1936 0–1
- Reshevsky vs. G Treysman, 1938 1–0
- Reshevsky vs. F Vasconcellos, 1944 1–0
- Botvinnik vs. Reshevsky, 1948 0–1
- Reshevsky vs. Najdorf, 1952 1–0
- Reshevsky vs. Petrosian, 1953 ½–½
- Szabo vs. Reshevsky, 1953 ½–½
- Reshevsky vs. Geller, 1953 ½–½
- Larry Evans vs. Reshevsky, 1963 ½–½
- Reshevsky vs. Fischer, 1961. 11-game match.

== See also ==
- List of Jewish chess players

Achievements
Preceded by Frank Marshall	United States Chess Champion; 1936–1944	Succeeded by Arnold Denker
Preceded by Arnold Denker	United States Chess Champion; 1946–1948	Succeeded by Herman Steiner
Preceded by Larry Evans	United States Chess Champion; 1969–1972	Succeeded by Robert Byrne
