= World Chess Championship 1954 =

	Defending champion	Challenger
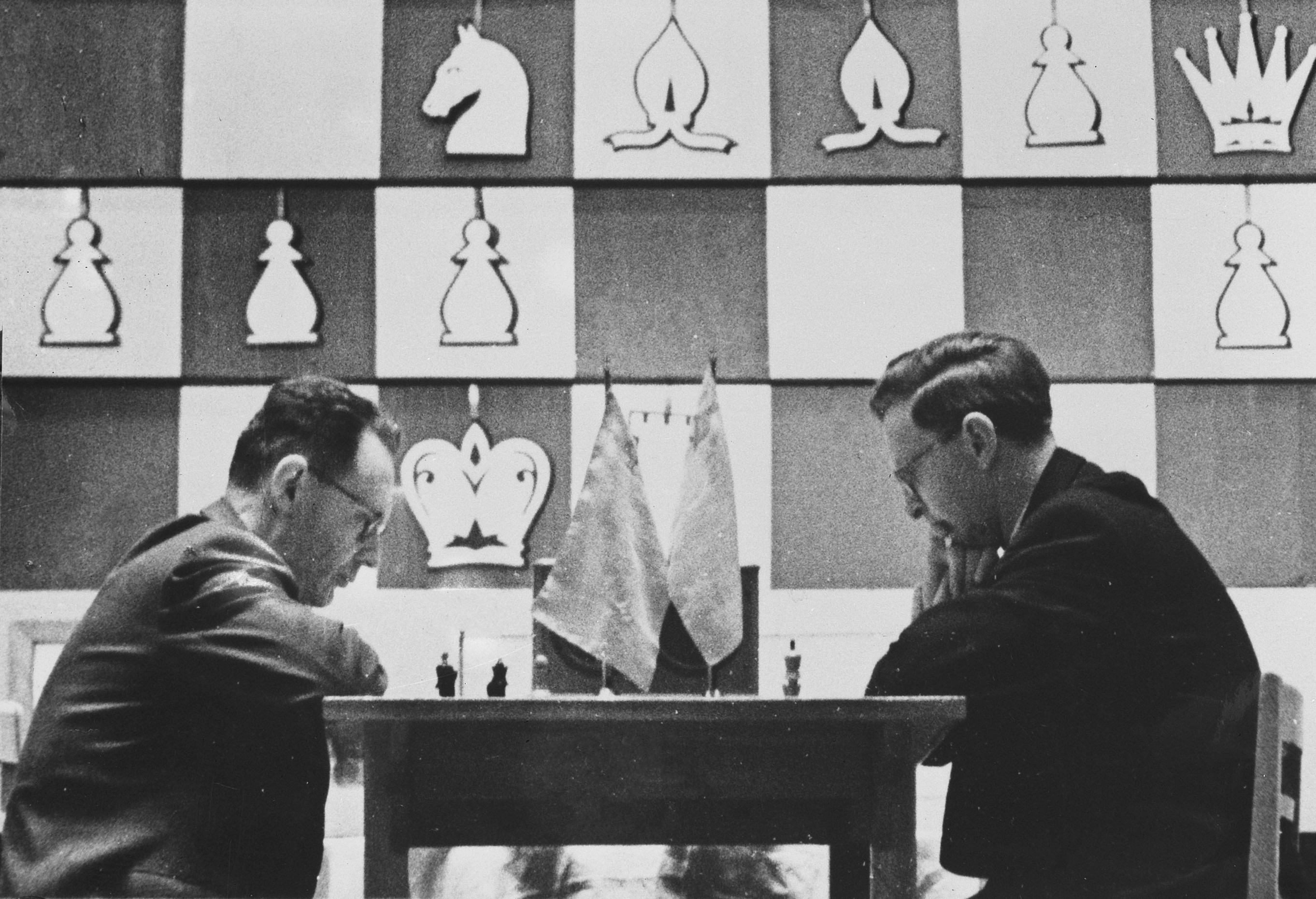
	(Soviet Union) Mikhail Botvinnik	(Soviet Union) Vasily Smyslov
12	Scores	12
	Born 17 August 1911; 42 years old	Born 24 March 1921; 32/33 years old
	Winner of the 1951 World Chess Championship	Winner of the 1953 Candidates Tournament

A World Chess Championship was played between Mikhail Botvinnik and Vasily Smyslov in Moscow from March 16 to May 13, 1954. Botvinnik had been World Champion since 1948 and had successfully defended the title in 1951, while Smyslov earned the right to challenge by winning the 1953 Candidates tournament.

The match was drawn 12–12, meaning Botvinnik retained the world title.

== 1952 Interzonal tournament ==
An interzonal tournament was held at Saltsjöbaden in Stockholm, Sweden, in September and October 1952. The top eight finishers qualified for the Candidates tournament.

1952 Interzonal Tournament
		1	2	3	4	5	6	7	8	9	10	11	12	13	14	15	16	17	18	19	20	21	Total	Tie break
1	Alexander Kotov (Soviet Union)	x	½	½	½	½	½	1	1	1	1	1	½	½	1	1	1	1	1	1	1	1	16½	
2	Mark Taimanov (Soviet Union)	½	x	½	½	½	½	½	½	1	½	½	½	1	1	1	½	1	½	½	1	1	13½	125.50
3	Tigran Petrosian (Soviet Union)	½	½	x	½	½	½	1	½	½	½	½	1	½	½	1	1	½	1	1	1	½	13½	125.00
4	Efim Geller (Soviet Union)	½	½	½	x	½	1	0	0	1	½	1	½	½	½	1	½	1	1	1	1	½	13	
5	Yuri Averbakh (Soviet Union)	½	½	½	½	x	0	½	1	½	½	½	½	1	½	½	1	½	1	1	1	½	12½	115.25
6	Gideon Ståhlberg (Sweden)	½	½	½	0	1	x	0	1	½	½	½	½	½	1	1	1	0	1	1	½	1	12½	115.00
7	László Szabó (Hungary)	0	½	0	1	½	1	x	½	½	1	½	½	½	½	1	1	½	½	1	½	1	12½	114.25
8	Svetozar Gligorić (Yugoslavia)	0	½	½	1	0	0	½	x	0	½	½	½	1	1	½	1	1	1	1	1	1	12½	105.50
9	Wolfgang Unzicker (West Germany)	0	0	½	0	½	½	½	1	x	½	0	½	1	½	½	½	½	½	1	½	½	11½	
10	Erich Eliskases (Argentina)	0	½	½	½	½	½	0	½	½	x	½	1	0	½	0	½	1	½	1	1	1	10½	
11	Hermann Pilnik (Argentina)	0	½	½	0	½	½	½	½	1	½	x	1	0	½	½	½	1	0	½	½	1	10	93.75
12	Luděk Pachman (Czechoslovakia)	½	½	0	½	½	½	½	½	½	0	0	x	½	½	1	½	½	1	1	½	½	10	92.50
13	Herman Steiner (United States)	½	0	½	½	0	½	½	0	0	1	1	½	x	½	0	0	1	1	½	1	1	10	88.50
14	Aleksandar Matanović (Yugoslavia)	0	0	½	½	½	0	½	0	½	½	½	½	½	x	0	½	1	½	1	½	1	9	
15	Gedeon Barcza (Hungary)	0	0	0	0	½	0	0	½	½	1	½	0	1	1	x	1	½	0	0	1	½	8	
16	Gösta Stoltz (Sweden)	0	½	0	½	0	0	0	0	0	½	½	½	1	½	0	x	0	1	1	½	1	7½	
17	Luis Augusto Sánchez (Colombia)	0	0	½	0	½	1	½	0	0	0	0	½	0	0	½	1	x	½	0	1	1	7	
18	Robert Wade (England)	0	½	0	0	0	0	½	0	0	½	1	0	0	½	1	0	½	x	½	0	1	6	
19	Paul Vaitonis (Canada)	0	½	0	0	0	0	0	0	½	0	½	0	½	0	1	0	1	½	x	½	0	5	
20	Harry Golombek (England)	0	0	0	0	0	½	½	0	0	0	½	½	0	½	0	½	0	1	½	x	0	4½	39.25
21	Lodewijk Prins (Netherlands)	0	0	½	½	½	0	0	0	0	0	0	½	0	0	½	0	0	0	1	1	x	4½	38.00

Only the top five were supposed to have qualified for a 12-player Candidates Tournament, but four players were tied for fifth place, and since the Sonneborn–Berger tie-break margins were so small, all four were included. The tournament was surrounded by some controversy as the five Soviet players took the top five spots – having drawn every single game amongst themselves, several of them after suspiciously few moves. Originally, the 1952 Interzonal was supposed to have featured 22 players, but Julio Bolbochán of Argentina suffered a hemorrhage and had to withdraw after a first-round adjournment.

== 1953 Candidates tournament ==
The Candidates tournament was held in Zürich, Switzerland, from August to October 1953, with the winner qualifying for the championship match against Botvinnik.

The field consisted of 15 players: the top eight from the 1952 Interzonal, the top five from the previous Candidates Tournament (Bronstein, Boleslavsky, Smyslov, Keres, and Najdorf), and the last two players from the 1948 championships not already qualified (Reshevsky and Euwe).

After 22 rounds, Smyslov and Reshevsky were tied for the lead on 13½ points out of 21, followed by Bronstein on 12½, and Keres on 12. Smyslov took a decisive lead in the next few rounds:

- In round 23, Kotov defeated Reshevsky while Smyslov had the bye. Bronstein and Keres moved up to 13 points.
- In round 24, Smyslov defeated Keres with black, while Reshevsky drew with Geller, and Bronstein also drew.
- In round 25, Smyslov defeated Reshevsky, while Bronstein lost to Geller, and Keres had the bye.

So in those three rounds, Smyslov scored 2/2 while Reshevsky scored ½/3. After round 25 the leaders were: Smyslov 15½ with a game in hand, Reshevsky 14, Bronstein 13½, and Keres 13 with a game in hand. Smyslov drew his five remaining games, beginning with Bronstein in round 26.

Smyslov qualified as challenger by winning the tournament.

#	Player	1	2	3	4	5	6	7	8	9	10	11	12	13	14	15	Total
1	Vasily Smyslov (USSR)	xx	½½	11	½1	½½	11	½½	½0	½½	½½	½½	½½	1½	11	1½	18
2–4	David Bronstein (USSR)	½½	xx	1½	11	½½	½0	½½	½½	1½	½½	½½	01	1½	½½	½½	16
2–4	Paul Keres (USSR)	00	0½	xx	½½	½1	½1	½½	½½	½½	0½	11	1½	½1	½½	11	16
2–4	Samuel Reshevsky (USA)	½0	00	½½	xx	½½	½½	½½	10	½½	½1	½1	1½	½1	11	1½	16
5	Tigran Petrosian (USSR)	½½	½½	½0	½½	xx	½½	0½	½½	00	½½	½½	11	½1	1½	11	15
6–7	Efim Geller (USSR)	00	½1	½0	½½	½½	xx	11	½0	01	½½	01	1½	½1	01	½½	14½
6–7	Miguel Najdorf (Argentina)	½½	½½	½½	½½	1½	00	xx	1½	1½	½0	½½	½½	½½	0½	11	14½
8–9	Alexander Kotov (USSR)	½1	½½	½½	01	½½	½1	0½	xx	10	1½	00	10	1½	0½	01	14
8–9	Mark Taimanov (USSR)	½½	0½	½½	½½	11	10	0½	01	xx	10	½½	½½	½0	0½	11	14
10–11	Yuri Averbakh (USSR)	½½	½½	1½	0½	½½	½½	1½	0½	01	xx	½½	½½	0½	11	00	13½
10–11	Isaac Boleslavsky (USSR)	½½	½½	00	½0	½½	10	½½	11	½½	½½	xx	½0	½½	½1	½½	13½
12	László Szabó (Hungary)	½½	10	0½	0½	00	0½	½½	01	½½	½½	½1	xx	1½	½½	1½	13
13	Svetozar Gligorić (Yugoslavia)	0½	0½	½0	½0	½0	½0	½½	0½	½1	1½	½½	0½	xx	½1	11	12½
14	Max Euwe (Netherlands)	00	½½	½½	00	0½	10	1½	1½	1½	00	½0	½½	½0	xx	1½	11½
15	Gideon Ståhlberg (Sweden)	0½	½½	00	0½	00	½½	00	10	00	11	½½	0½	00	0½	xx	8

=== Allegations of Soviet collusion ===
There have been allegations of Soviet collusion in the Candidates tournament. Most sensationally, writing in the early 2000s, David Bronstein alleged that certain players were pressured to ensure Smyslov would win ahead of Reshevsky. He alleged that Keres was pressured to make a quick draw with white in his round 24 game against Smyslov, but that Keres resisted this, but the pressure made him in no fit state to play (and he lost). He also alleged that he (Bronstein) was pressured to make a draw with white against Smyslov in round 26, and he complied by playing the unaggressive Ruy Lopez exchange variation.

Soon after the article emerged, Smyslov replied, criticising the allegations, though Andy Soltis read that as meaning he didn't deny them. Yuri Averbakh said that Bronstein "cannot be 100% objective" on his world championship attempts.

=== Books ===
The tournament is famous for the strength of the players, the high quality of the games, and books on the tournament by participants David Bronstein and Miguel Najdorf that are regarded as among the best tournament books ever written.

== 1954 Championship match ==
Position: e8 black rook, f8 black bishop, g8 black king, b7 black pawn, e7 black queen, h7 black pawn, a6 black rook, b6 black knight, c6 black pawn, e6 black bishop, g6 black pawn, c5 black pawn, e5 white pawn, f5 black pawn, c4 white pawn, f4 white pawn, b3 white pawn, c3 white knight, d3 white rook, e3 white bishop, g3 white pawn, h3 white pawn, f2 white queen, g2 white bishop, d1 white rook, g1 white king

In this position from Game 24, Smyslov offers a draw, conceding the match to Botvinnik

The 1954 World Chess Championship match took place in Moscow between reigning champion Mikhail Botvinnik and Vassily Smyslov. The match was a best of 24 games with the champion, Botvinnik, retaining his title following a 12–12. The tournament opened on March 16 at the Tchaikovsky Concert Hall to a crowd of roughly 2000 spectators. The whole match was well attended, with vocal crowds leading to a "Silence, please" sign being installed in the tournament hall in the middle of the match. The match featured the first televised World Championship game with game 12 broadcasting a win for Botvinnik.

Botvinnik started strong with 3 wins and 3 draws in the first six games despite routinely having worse positions out of the opening Smyslov won game 7 after Botvinnik got into time trouble and misplayed the end game. Following a game 8 draw, Smyslov went on to win 3 straight games, giving him the lead for the first time at 5–6. He dropped game 12 bringing the score back even. After going down in the third quarter of games, Smyslov fought back to even the score in the last quarter with 2 wins and 3 draws going into the final game 11½–11½. Smyslov would win the title with a win in game 24, and Botvinnik would retain the title with a win or draw. Enthusiasm for the game was at a peak with H. Golombek of British Chess Magazine claiming the line for tickets was a half mile long. The game ended in 22 moves—the shortest of the match—after Smyslov offered a draw and conceding the match to Botvinnik.

=== Match ===
World Chess Championship Match 1954
	1	2	3	4	5	6	7	8	9	10	11	12	13	14	15	16	17	18	19	20	21	22	23	24	Points
Mikhail Botvinnik (Soviet Union)	1	1	½	1	½	½	0	½	0	0	0	1	1	0	1	1	½	½	½	0	½	½	0	½	12
Vasily Smyslov (Soviet Union)	0	0	½	0	½	½	1	½	1	1	1	0	0	1	0	0	½	½	½	1	½	½	1	½	12

Botvinnik retained the Championship.
