= Sorcerer's Apprentice =

Sorcerer's Apprentice may refer to:

- "The Sorcerer's Apprentice" (German: "Der Zauberlehrling"), a 1797 poem by Johann Wolfgang von Goethe

== Books ==
- The Sorcerer's Apprentice (Ewers novel) (German: Der Zauberlehrling), 1910 novel by Hanns Heinz Ewers
- Sorcerer's Apprentice (Augiéras novel) (French: L'apprenti sorcier), a 1964 novel by François Augiéras
- The Sorcerer's Apprentice (Bulis novel), a 1995 novel written by Christopher Bulis based on the British science fiction television series Doctor Who
- Sorcerer's Apprentice (Shah book), a 1998 travel book by Tahir Shah
- The Sorcerer's Apprentice (chess book), a 1995 book compiling 222 games by David Bronstein in the original edition in 1995 and 237 in the 2009 updated version, written by David Bronstein & Tom Fuerstenberg

== Film and television ==
- "The Sorcerer's Apprentice", a segment of the 1940 Disney animated film Fantasia, which uses the music by Paul Dukas and the story from Goethe's poem
- The Sorcerer's Apprentice (1955 film), a short film
- The Sorcerer's Apprentice (1980 film), a Canadian animated short film
- The Sorcerer's Apprentice (2001 film), a British film made in South Africa
- The Sorcerer's Apprentice (2010 film), a fantasy film starring Nicolas Cage
- The Sorcerer's Apprentice (TV series), a children's television series
- "The Sorcerer's Apprentice" (Alfred Hitchcock Presents), a 1962 episode that never received a network airing
- Krabat – The Sorcerer's Apprentice, a 1978 animated film by Karel Zeman

== Other uses ==
- The Sorcerer's Apprentice (Dukas), the 1897 symphonic poem by Paul Dukas based on Goethe's poem
- Sorcerer's Apprentice (video game), based on a segment of the 1940 film Fantasia
- The Sorcerer's Apprentice, a 2010 video game based on 2010 The Sorcerer's Apprentice film

== See also ==
- The Magician's Apprentice (disambiguation)
- Sorcerer's Apprentice syndrome, a computer network protocol flaw
