= François Augiéras =

French painter and writer

François Augiéras (18 July 1925 – 13 December 1971) was an American-born French painter and writer.

== Biography ==
François Augiéras was born in Rochester, New York, two months after his father's death. His father taught the piano at the Eastman School of Music. He moved to France (Paris and later Dordogne) with his mother. At the age of fourteen, he left home and started on a nomadic life. In 1944, he joined the French Navy. He spent some time in a psychiatric asylum and in a monastery. He later moved to El Goléa, where his uncle lived. His first novel, The Old Man and the Child, is loosely based on the avuncular rapport that ensued.

His novels deal with incest, homosexuality, sadism and even bestiality. They also describe his trips to North Africa and Greece. André Gide acted as one of his mentors.

He died in a public hospital in Dordogne in 1971.

== Bibliography ==
- The Old Man and the Child (1954)
- Zirara (1957)
- Le Voyage des morts (1959)
- Une adolescence au temps du Maréchal et de multiples aventures (1968)
- Un voyage au Mont Athos (1970)
- Sorcerer's Apprentice (1964)
- Domme ou l'Essai d'occupation (1982)
- Les Barbares d'Occident (1990)
- Lettres à Paul Placet (2000)
- Le Diable ermite (2002)
- La Chasse fantastique (2005)

== Legacy ==
- The Association François Augiéras is headquartered in Domme, Dordogne, France.
- The Double Steps, a 2012 film directed by Isaki Lacuesta, based on François Augiéras.
