= World Chess Championship 1951 =

	Defending champion	Challenger
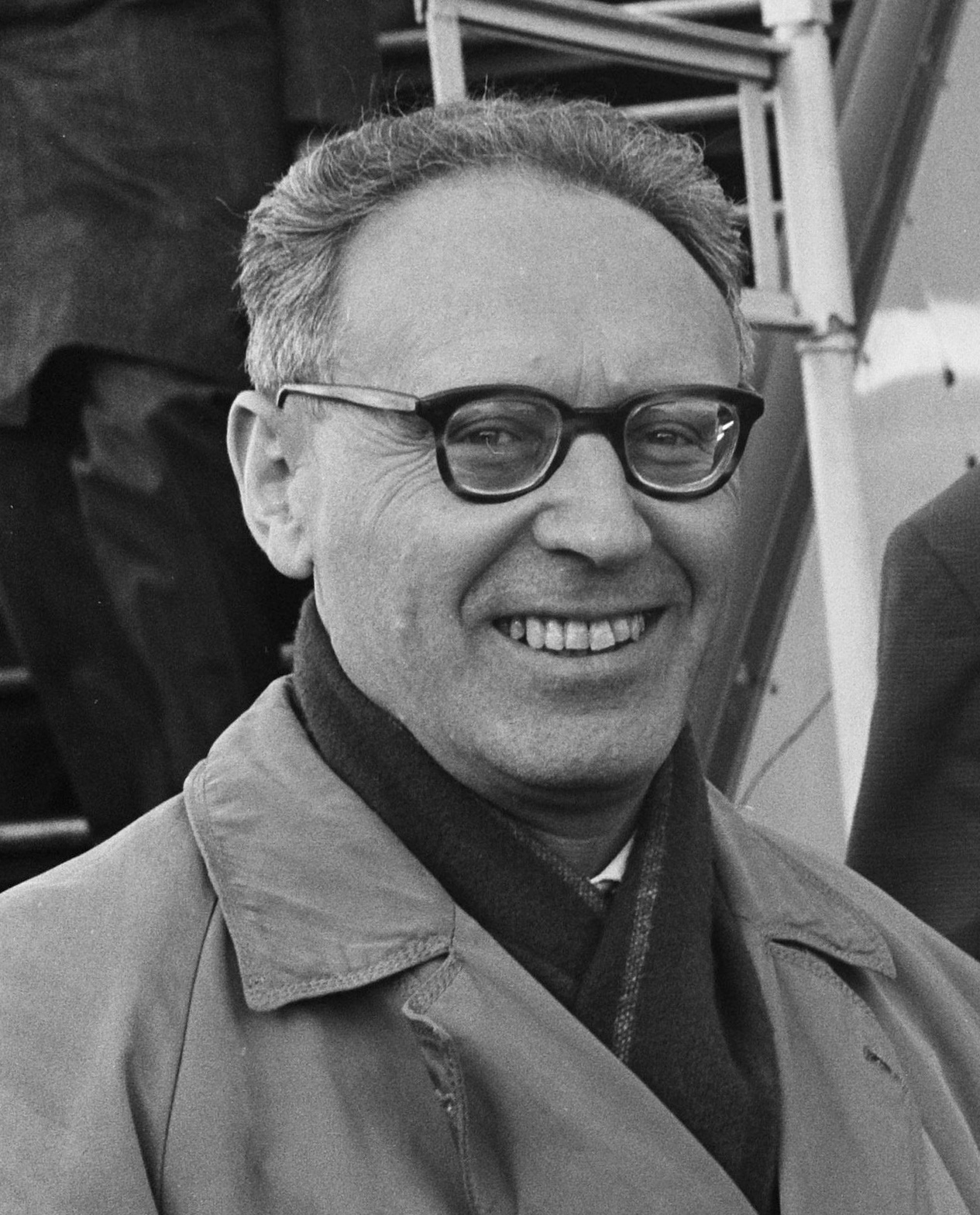
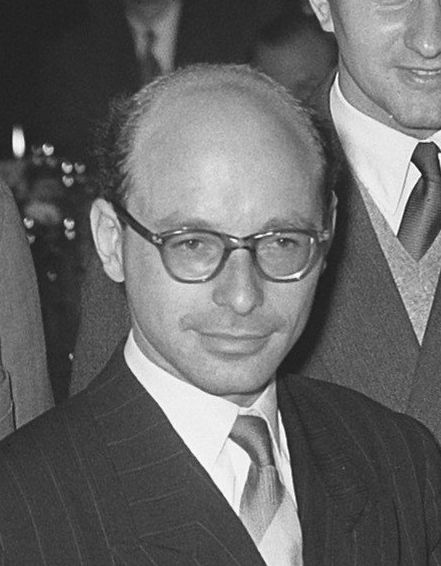
	Mikhail Botvinnik	David Bronstein
	(Soviet Union) Mikhail Botvinnik	(Soviet Union) David Bronstein
12	Scores	12
	Born 17 August 1911; 39 years old	Born 19 February 1924; 27 years old
	Winner of the 1948 World Chess Championship	Winner of the 1950 Candidates Tournament

The 1951 World Chess Championship was played between Mikhail Botvinnik and David Bronstein in Moscow from March 15 to May 11, 1951. It was the first match played under the supervision of FIDE; and the first to use a qualifying system of an Interzonal and Candidates Tournament to choose a challenger – a system which stayed in place until 1993.

Botvinnik was the defending champion: he was 39 years old, had been a world leading player in the 1930s and World Champion since 1948. The challenger, David Bronstein, was 27 years old and relatively new to top-level competition.

The match ended in a 12–12 tie (5 wins each, and 14 draws), meaning Botvinnik retained the title of World Champion. Writing in 1973, Al Horowitz described the match as "perhaps the most interesting match ever played for the world championship".

== 1948 Interzonal tournament ==
An interzonal tournament was held at Saltsjöbaden in Stockholm, Sweden, in July and August 1948. The top eight finishers qualified for the Candidates tournament.

1948 Interzonal Tournament
		1	2	3	4	5	6	7	8	9	10	11	12	13	14	15	16	17	18	19	20	Total
1	David Bronstein (Soviet Union)	x	1	½	1	½	½	½	½	½	½	1	½	½	1	½	1	½	1	1	1	13½
2	László Szabó (Hungary)	0	x	½	½	1	½	1	½	½	1	½	1	1	1	½	1	½	½	1	0	12½
3	Isaac Boleslavsky (Soviet Union)	½	½	x	½	½	½	0	1	½	1	½	½	1	½	½	½	1	1	1	½	12
4	Alexander Kotov (Soviet Union)	0	½	½	x	½	½	½	½	½	½	1	½	½	½	½	1	1	1	1	½	11½
5	Andor Lilienthal (Soviet Union)	½	0	½	½	x	1	1	½	½	½	0	½	½	½	1	½	1	½	½	1	11
6	Igor Bondarevsky (Soviet Union)	½	½	½	½	0	x	½	½	1	0	½	1	½	0	½	½	1	½	1	1	10½
7	Miguel Najdorf (Argentina)	½	0	1	½	0	½	x	½	½	1	0	1	½	0	½	1	½	½	1	1	10½
8	Gideon Ståhlberg (Sweden)	½	½	0	½	½	½	½	x	½	0	½	1	1	½	½	½	½	1	½	1	10½
9	Salo Flohr (Soviet Union)	½	½	½	½	½	0	½	½	x	½	½	½	½	½	½	½	1	½	1	1	10½
10	Petar Trifunović (Yugoslavia)	½	0	0	½	½	1	0	1	½	x	½	½	0	1	½	½	1	½	1	½	10
11	Vasja Pirc (Yugoslavia)	0	½	½	0	1	½	1	½	½	½	x	½	½	0	1	0	½	1	½	½	9½
12	Svetozar Gligorić (Yugoslavia)	½	0	½	½	½	0	0	0	½	½	½	x	1	½	1	1	1	½	0	1	9½
13	Eero Böök (Finland)	½	0	0	½	½	½	½	0	½	1	½	0	x	½	½	½	½	1	1	1	9½
14	Viacheslav Ragozin (Soviet Union)	0	0	½	½	½	1	1	½	½	0	1	½	½	x	0	0	½	0	½	1	8½
15	Daniel Yanofsky (Canada)	½	½	½	½	0	½	½	½	½	½	0	0	½	1	x	0	½	½	½	1	8½
16	Savielly Tartakower (France)	0	0	½	0	½	½	0	½	½	½	1	0	½	1	1	x	0	½	½	½	8
17	Ludek Pachman (Czechoslovakia)	½	½	0	0	0	0	½	½	0	0	½	0	½	½	½	1	x	1	½	1	7½
18	Gösta Stoltz (Sweden)	0	½	0	0	½	½	½	0	½	½	0	½	0	1	½	½	0	x	½	½	6½
19	Lajos Steiner (Australia)	0	0	0	0	½	0	0	½	0	0	½	1	0	½	½	½	½	½	x	½	5½
20	Erik Lundin (Sweden)	0	1	½	½	0	0	0	0	0	½	½	0	0	0	0	½	0	½	½	x	4½

The four players tied for sixth place were to have played off for three spots in the Candidates tournament, but Bondarevsky had to withdraw due to illness, so the other three qualified automatically.

== 1950 Candidates tournament ==
The 1950 Candidates tournament was held in Budapest, Hungary, in April and May 1950. The players who finished second through fifth in the 1948 championship tournament (Smyslov, Keres, Reshevsky, and Euwe) were seeded directly into the tournament, along with Reuben Fine, who had been invited to the 1948 tournament but declined, and the top eight finishers from the Interzonal.

It has been written that the two American players, Reshevsky and Fine, were prevented from travelling to Hungary by the US State Department, with travel restrictions due to the Cold War; however, Reshevsky said in 1991 that he could have gone but did not want to. Euwe declined due to work commitments, and Bondarevsky due to illness.

1950 Candidates Tournament
		1	2	3	4	5	6	7	8	9	10	Score
1–2	David Bronstein (Soviet Union)	xx	= =	0 1	= 1	1 1	1 =	0 1	= =	1 =	= 1	12
1–2	Isaac Boleslavsky (Soviet Union)	= =	xx	1 =	= =	= =	1 =	= =	= 1	= 1	1 1	12
3	Vasily Smyslov (Soviet Union)	1 0	0 =	xx	= =	1 =	= 1	0 1	= 1	= =	= =	10
4	Paul Keres (Soviet Union)	= 0	= =	= =	xx	= =	1 0	1 =	= =	= 1	= =	9½
5	Miguel Najdorf (Argentina)	0 0	= =	0 =	= =	xx	= =	= =	1 1	= 1	= =	9
6	Alexander Kotov (Soviet Union)	0 =	0 =	= 0	0 1	= =	xx	= 1	1 0	1 0	1 =	8½
7	Gideon Ståhlberg (Sweden)	1 0	= =	1 0	0 =	= =	= 0	xx	= =	= =	= =	8
8–10	Andor Lilienthal (Soviet Union)	= =	= 0	= 0	= =	0 0	0 1	= =	xx	1 0	= =	7
8–10	László Szabó (Hungary)	0 =	= 0	= =	= 0	= 0	0 1	= =	0 1	xx	1 0	7
8–10	Salo Flohr (Soviet Union)	= 0	0 0	= =	= =	= =	0 =	= =	= =	0 1	xx	7

The co-winners then played a 12-game match in Moscow in July and August 1950. In the event of another tie, the first decisive game would determine Botvinnik's challenger for the title.

Candidates playoff, 1950
	1	2	3	4	5	6	7	8	9	10	11	12	Points	13	14	Total
David Bronstein (Soviet Union)	1	½	½	½	½	½	1	0	½	½	0	½	6	½	1	7½
Isaac Boleslavsky (Soviet Union)	0	½	½	½	½	½	0	1	½	½	1	½	6	½	0	6½

Bronstein thus earned the right to challenge the reigning champion.

=== Boleslavsky's strategy ===
Going into the final round of the Candidates tournament, Boleslavsky had a half-point lead over Bronstein. Boleslavsky had white against Stahlberg, and offered a short draw when he was in a good position, which Stahlberg accepted. This gave Bronstein the opportunity to catch him, which he did, with a brilliant win against Keres. It has been said, by both Bronstein and by Yuri Averbakh, that Boleslavsky allowed Bronstein to catch him. Boleslavsky had a very poor record against Botvinnik, and hoped that a tie would mean a 3-way match between Botvinnik, Boleslavsky, and Bronstein, although this did not eventuate.

It has also been speculated that the result of the Bronstein–Boleslavsky match was pre-arranged by the contestants.

== 1951 Championship match ==
=== Conditions ===
The match was played as best of 24 games. If it ended 12–12, Botvinnik, the title holder, would retain the Championship.

=== Match ===
World Chess Championship Match 1951
	1	2	3	4	5	6	7	8	9	10	11	12	13	14	15	16	17	18	19	20	21	22	23	24	Points
Mikhail Botvinnik (Soviet Union)	½	½	½	½	0	1	1	½	½	½	0	1	½	½	½	½	0	½	1	½	0	0	1	½	12
David Bronstein (Soviet Union)	½	½	½	½	1	0	0	½	½	½	1	0	½	½	½	½	1	½	0	½	1	1	0	½	12

Botvinnik retained the championship.

== Games ==
=== Game 1: Botvinnik–Bronstein, ½–½ ===
Mar 16.

1.d4 e6 2.c4 f5 3.g3 Nf6 4.Bg2 Be7 5.Nc3 0-0 6.e3 d6 7.Nge2 c6 8.0-0 e5 9.d5 Qe8 10.e4 Qh5 11.exf5 Bxf5 12.f3 Qg6 13.Be3 Nbd7 14.Qd2 cxd5 15.cxd5 Bd8 16.Rac1 Ba5 17.g4 Bd3 18.Rfd1 Bc4 19.Qc2 Qxc2 20.Rxc2 Nb6 21.Rcd2 Ba6 22.Bf2 Nc4 23.Rc2 Bb6 24.Bxb6 axb6 25.Re1 Ne3 26.Rd2 Nc4 27.Rc2 Ne3 28.Rd2 Nc4 29.Rc2 ½–½

=== Game 2: Bronstein–Botvinnik, ½–½ ===
Mar 18.

1.d4 Nf6 2.c4 g6 3.Nc3 d5 4.cxd5 Nxd5 5.e4 Nxc3 6.bxc3 c5 7.Bc4 Bg7 8.Ne2 0-0 9.0-0 Nd7 10.Bg5 h6 11.Be3 Qc7 12.Rc1 a6 13.Qd2 Kh7 14.Bd3 b5 15.Nf4 e5 16.Nd5 Qd6 17.dxc5 Nxc5 18.c4 Nxd3 19.Qxd3 Rd8 20.c5 Qc6 21.Rfd1 Be6 22.Rd2 Rd7 23.Rcd1 a5 24.a3 Rad8 25.Qb3 Rb8 26.f3 Rdb7 27.Qb2 b4 28.Nb6 Bf8 29.axb4 axb4 30.Rc1 b3 31.Nd5 Bg7 32.Rd3 Rb5 33.h4 R8b7 34.Kh2 f5 35.Rcc3 fxe4 36.fxe4 Rb4 37.Nxb4 Rxb4 38.Rd6 Qxe4 39.Bf2 Qf4+ 40.Bg3 Qf5 41.Rf3 Qg4 42.c6 g5 43.c7 Rc4 44.Rxb3 e4 45.Qf2 gxh4 46.Bf4 Rxc7 47.Rxe6 Qxe6 48.Bxc7 Qxb3 49.Qf5+ ½–½

=== Game 3: Botvinnik–Bronstein, ½–½ ===
Mar 20.

1.d4 e6 2.e4 d5 3.Nd2 c5 4.exd5 exd5 5.Bb5+ Bd7 6.Qe2+ Be7 7.dxc5 Nf6 8.Ngf3 0-0 9.0-0 Re8 10.Nb3 Bxc5 11.Qd3 a6 12.Bxd7 Nbxd7 13.Bg5 Bf8 14.Rad1 Qc7 15.c3 h6 16.Bh4 Re4 17.Bg3 Qb6 18.Nfd2 Ree8 19.Qc2 Rac8 20.Nf3 g6 21.Rfe1 Bg7 22.Rxe8+ Rxe8 23.Bf4 Bf8 24.h3 Kh7 25.Nh2 Ne5 26.Be3 Qc7 27.Bd4 Ne4 28.Bxe5 Qxe5 29.Ng4 Qf4 30.Qc1 Qd6 31.Qc2 Nf6 32.Nxf6+ Qxf6 33.Qd3 Rd8 34.Qe3 Bg7 35.g3 h5 36.Kg2 Rd6 37.Nd4 Rd7 38.Nf3 Bh6 39.Qd4 Qxd4 40.Nxd4 Bg7 41.Nc2 a5 42.a4 Rd8 43.Kf3 Bf6 44.Nd4 Kg7 45.Nb5 Kf8 46.Nc7 d4 47.c4 Be7 48.Nd5 Bc5 49.Ke2 Re8+ 50.Kd3 b6 51.g4 Kg7 52.Rh1 h4 53.g5 Re5 54.Rg1 Kf8 55.f3 Kg7 56.f4 Re8 57.Kd2 Re6 58.Re1 Rxe1 59.Kxe1 Kf8 60.Ke2 Ke8 61.Kd3 Kd7 62.Ke4 Kd6 63.Nf6 Ke6 64.Kd3 Kf5 65.Nd5 Ke6 66.Ke4 d3 67.Kxd3 Kf5 ½–½

=== Game 4: Bronstein–Botvinnik, ½–½ ===
Mar 23.

1.d4 d5 2.c4 c6 3.Nc3 Nf6 4.Nf3 g6 5.cxd5 cxd5 6.Bf4 Bg7 7.e3 0-0 8.Be2 Nc6 9.h3 Ne4 10.Rc1 Be6 11.0-0 Rc8 12.Nd2 Nxd2 13.Qxd2 Qa5 14.a3 a6 15.Ra1 Bf5 16.Rfd1 Rcd8 17.b4 Qb6 18.Na4 Qa7 19.Bc7 Rd7 20.Bb6 Qb8 21.f4 Na7 22.g4 Be6 23.Bxa7 Qxa7 24.Nc5 Rd6 25.Nxe6 Rxe6 26.Rac1 Qb8 27.Kg2 Rc8 28.Bf3 Rd6 29.Rc5 e6 30.Rdc1 Rxc5 31.Rxc5 Bf8 32.Qc2 Rd8 33.Rc3 Bd6 34.h4 Kg7 35.Qc1 h6 36.Rc2 g5 37.fxg5 hxg5 38.h5 Kh6 39.Qe1 Rf8 40.e4 dxe4 41.Qxe4 Rc8 42.Bd1 Rxc2+ 43.Bxc2 Qh8 44.Bd3 Qg7 45.Kf3 a5 46.bxa5 Bxa3 47.Kg2 Bd6 ½–½

=== Game 5: Botvinnik–Bronstein, 0–1 ===
Botvinnik–Bronstein, game 5

Position: h8 black king, d7 white rook, g7 black pawn, h7 black pawn, b5 white knight, c5 white pawn, f5 black rook, b4 white pawn, g4 black knight, d3 black pawn, g3 white pawn, c2 black knight, g2 white king, h2 white pawn

Bronstein took the early lead in game 5. Here he played 39...Nce3+, and Botvinnik resigned because it is mate next move.

Mar 25.

1.d4 Nf6 2.c4 e6 3.Nc3 Bb4 4.e3 0-0 5.Bd3 c5 6.Nf3 b6 7.0-0 Bb7 8.Na4 cxd4 9.a3 Be7 10.exd4 Qc7 11.b4 Ng4 12.g3 f5 13.Nc3 a6 14.Re1 Nc6 15.Bf1 Nd8 16.Bf4 Bd6 17.Bxd6 Qxd6 18.Bg2 Nf7 19.c5 Qc7 20.Rc1 Rae8 21.Na4 b5 22.Nc3 f4 23.d5 fxg3 24.fxg3 exd5 25.Qd4 Nf6 26.Nh4 Re5 27.Rxe5 Qxe5 28.Qxe5 Nxe5 29.Nf5 Nc4 30.Rd1 Kh8 31.Re1 Nxa3 32.Nd6 Bc6 33.Ra1 Nc2 34.Rxa6 d4 35.Ncxb5 Bxg2 36.Kxg2 Ng4 37.Nf5 d3 38.Rd6 Rxf5 39.Rxd7 Nce3+ 0–1

=== Game 6: Bronstein–Botvinnik, 0–1 ===
Bronstein–Botvinnik, game 6

Position: d8 white knight, b7 black pawn, a5 black pawn, c4 white pawn, f4 black king, b3 white king, c3 white pawn, e3 black pawn

In game 6, Bronstein made one of the worst-ever blunders in world championship play. He played 57.Kc2??, apparently expecting 57...Kf3 58.Ne6 e2 59.Nd4+ (this line, however, also leads to a win for Black with correct play,) but resigned when Botvinnik played 57...Kg3, after which 59.Nd4 is not check. 57.Ne6+ was a simple draw. The blunder so upset Bronstein that he played weakly, and lost, in game 7.

Mar 26.

1.e4 c5 2.Nf3 Nc6 3.d4 cxd4 4.Nxd4 Nf6 5.Nc3 d6 6.Bg5 e6 7.Qd2 h6 8.Bxf6 gxf6 9.0-0-0 a6 10.f4 Bd7 11.Kb1 Be7 12.Be2 Nxd4 13.Qxd4 Qa5 14.Rhf1 h5 15.Rf3 Qc5 16.Qd2 Bc6 17.Re3 Qa5 18.Bf3 0-0-0 19.Qd3 Rd7 20.h4 Kb8 21.a3 Bd8 22.Ka2 Qc5 23.Re2 a5 24.a4 Bb6 25.b3 Rc8 26.Qc4 Qxc4 27.bxc4 Rh8 28.Kb3 Rdd8 29.Rd3 Bg1 30.Red2 Kc7 31.Ne2 Bf2 32.Rd1 Bc5 33.Ng3 Rdg8 34.Ne2 Rh7 35.f5 e5 36.Nc3 Bd4 37.Rxd4 exd4 38.Rxd4 Rhg7 39.Ne2 Rxg2 40.Bxg2 Rxg2 41.Nf4 Rg3+ 42.Kb2 Rg4 43.Nxh5 Rxh4 44.Nxf6 Kb6 45.Rxd6 Kc5 46.e5 Rd4 47.Rxd4 Kxd4 48.Ng4 Bxa4 49.e6 fxe6 50.f6 Be8 51.Kb3 e5 52.c3 Ke4 53.Nh6 Kf4 54.f7 Bxf7 55.Nxf7 e4 56.Nd8 e3 57.Kc2 Kg3 0–1

=== Game 7: Botvinnik–Bronstein, 1–0 ===
Mar 30.

1.d4 d5 2.c4 e6 3.Nf3 c6 4.g3 f5 5.Bg2 Nf6 6.0-0 Be7 7.b3 0-0 8.Ba3 b6 9.Bxe7 Qxe7 10.Ne5 Bb7 11.Nd2 Nbd7 12.Nxd7 Nxd7 13.e3 Rac8 14.Rc1 c5 15.Qe2 Nf6 16.cxd5 Bxd5 17.Bxd5 exd5 18.Nf3 Rc7 19.Rc2 Rfc8 20.Rfc1 Ne4 21.Ne5 Nf6 22.Qd3 g6 23.Qa6 Kg7 24.Qe2 Qd6 25.a4 Ne8 26.Qd2 Nf6 27.Qc3 Ne4 28.Qd3 cxd4 29.exd4 a5 30.Kg2 Nf6 31.Qe2 f4 32.gxf4 Nh5 33.Rxc7+ Rxc7 34.Rxc7+ Qxc7 35.Qg4 Nf6 36.Qe6 Nh5 37.Qd7+ Qxd7 38.Nxd7 Nxf4+ 39.Kf3 Nd3 40.Nxb6 Nb4 41.Kf4 Kf6 42.Nd7+ Ke7 43.Ne5 Ke6 44.Ke3 Kf5 45.f3 g5 46.Kd2 h5 47.Nd3 Na6 48.Nc5 Nb4 49.Nd3 Na6 50.h3 Nc7 51.Ke3 Na6 52.Ke2 Ke6 53.Kd2 Ke7 54.Kc3 Kd6 55.b4 axb4 56.Nxb4 Nc7 57.a5 Nb5+ 58.Kd3 Ke6 59.Ke3 Na7 60.a6 Nb5 61.Nc6 Nc7 62.Nb4 Kf5 63.a7 Ke6 64.Kf2 h4 65.f4 gxf4 66.Kf3 1–0

=== Game 8: Bronstein–Botvinnik, ½–½ ===
Apr 1.

1. d4 d5 2. c4 c6 3. Nc3 Nf6 4. Nf3 e6 5. e3 Nbd7 6. Bd3 dxc4 7. Bxc4 b5 8. Bd3 a6 9. e4 c5 10. e5 cxd4 11. Nxb5 Nxe5 12. Nxe5 axb5 13. Qf3 Bb4+ 14. Ke2 Rb8 15. Nc6 Bb7 16. Bf4 Bd6 17. Nxd8 Bxf3+ 18. Kxf3 Rxd8 19. Bxb5+ Ke7 20. Bd2 Rb8 21. a4 Nd5 22. b3 f5 23. Rhc1 e5 24. Ke2 e4 25. Rc6 Rhc8 26. Rac1 Rxc6 27. Rxc6 Rb6 28. Rxb6 Nxb6 29. a5 Nd5 30. a6 Bc5 31. b4 Ba7 32. Bc6 Kd6 33. Bb7 h6 34. h4 g5 35. hxg5 hxg5 36. Bxg5 Nxb4 37. Bc8 Ke5 38. Bd2 Nd5 39. Bb7 Nc3+ 40. Bxc3 dxc3 41. g3 ½–½

=== Game 9: Botvinnik–Bronstein, ½–½ ===
Botvinnik–Bronstein, game 9

Position: a8 black rook, b8 black knight, e8 black queen, f8 black rook, g8 black king, a7 black bishop, c7 black pawn, d7 black bishop, g7 black pawn, h7 black pawn, a6 black pawn, b6 white pawn, d6 black pawn, f6 black knight, d5 white pawn, e5 black pawn, f5 black pawn, a4 white knight, b3 white queen, e3 white pawn, f3 white pawn, g3 white pawn, a2 white pawn, b2 white pawn, d2 white bishop, e2 white knight, g2 white bishop, h2 white pawn, a1 white rook, e1 white king, h1 white rook

Position after Botvinnik's 15...b6!!.

Apr 3. Bronstein blunders his rook, and Botvinnik emerges with an extra piece. But Botvinnik squanders this advantage through ill advised trades and the endgame is drawn. There is controversy regarding the sealed move. Botvinnik stated that Bronstein was told to seal his 41st move by arbiter Opočensky, but pretended not to hear and made his move over the board to get Botvinnik to seal. This meant that Bronstein's move was now an open sealed move, and deputy arbiter Stahlberg reminded Opočensky of this. Bronstein stated that five hours had not yet elapsed so he had the right to make his move without sealing, and that Opočensky asked Botvinnik to seal his move at the appropriate time to which Botvinnik refused and left the hall.

1.d4 e6 2.c4 f5 3.g3 Nf6 4.Bg2 Be7 5.Nc3 0-0 6.d5 Bb4 7.Bd2 e5 8.e3 d6 9.Nge2 a6 10.Qc2 Qe8 11.f3 b5 12.Qb3 Bc5 13.cxb5 Bd7 14.Na4 Ba7 15.b6 Bxa4 16.b7 Bxb3 17.bxa8=Q Bb6 18.axb3 Qb5 19.Nc3 Qxb3 20.Rxa6 Nxa6 21.Qxa6 Nxd5 22.Qa4 Qxa4 23.Nxa4 Bxe3 24.Bf1 Ra8 25.b3 Bxd2+ 26.Kxd2 Kf8 27.Bd3 g6 28.Rc1 Rb8 29.Nc3 Nb4 30.Be2 Ra8 31.Na4 c6 32.Rc4 Rb8 33.Bd1 Ke7 34.Nb2 d5 35.Rh4 h5 36.g4 hxg4 37.fxg4 f4 38.g5 Rf8 39.Rh7+ Kd6 40.Rg7 e4 41.Rxg6+ Ke5 ½–½

=== Game 10: Bronstein–Botvinnik, ½–½ ===
Apr 6.

1.d4 e6 2.c4 f5 3.Nc3 Bb4 4.Qc2 Nf6 5.e3 0-0 6.Bd3 d6 7.Ne2 c5 8.a3 Bxc3+ 9.Nxc3 Nc6 10.dxc5 dxc5 11.b3 Bd7 12.Bb2 Ne5 13.Be2 Bc6 14.f3 Nh5 15.Nd1 Ng6 16.Qc3 Qg5 17.g3 e5 18.Nf2 Rad8 19.Rg1 Qe7 20.Rd1 Nf6 21.Rd2 a6 22.Kd1 b5 23.Kc1 b4 24.Qc2 Rxd2 25.Qxd2 Rd8 26.Qc2 f4 27.gxf4 exf4 28.e4 a5 29.Nd3 Nd7 30.axb4 axb4 31.Ba1 Ndf8 32.Rd1 Ne6 33.Ne5 Nxe5 34.Bxe5 Qg5 35.Rxd8+ Qxd8 36.Qd2 Qxd2+ 37.Kxd2 g5 38.Kd3 Kf7 39.Bf1 h5 40.Be2 Ke7 41.Bf1 Bd7 42.Bh3 Nd8 43.Bxd7 Kxd7 44.h3 Ke7 45.Bg7 Kf7 46.Be5 Ke7 47.Bg7 Nb7 48.Bh6 Kf6 49.Bf8 Kf7 50.Bh6 Kg6 51.Bf8 Kf6 52.Ke2 Kf7 53.Bh6 Kg6 54.Bf8 Kf6 55.Kd3 ½–½

=== Game 11: Botvinnik–Bronstein, 0–1 ===
Botvinnik–Bronstein, game 11

Position: h1 white king, e1 white rook, h2 white pawn, c2 white rook, a2 white pawn, g3 white pawn, f3 white bishop, e3 black bishop, b3 white pawn, h4 white queen, e4 black rook, d4 white knight, f5 black pawn, d5 black bishop, a5 black pawn, d6 black queen, b6 black pawn, h7 black pawn, f7 black pawn, h8 black king, d8 black rook

Position after Bronstein's 31...Re4! Bronstein called the h1–a8 diagonal the "weakest link" in White's position.

Apr 8.

1.d4 e6 2.Nf3 Nf6 3.c4 b6 4.g3 Bb7 5.Bg2 Be7 6.0-0 0-0 7.b3 d5 8.cxd5 exd5 9.Bb2 Nbd7 10.Nc3 Re8 11.Ne5 Bf8 12.Rc1 Nxe5 13.dxe5 Rxe5 14.Nb5 Re7 15.Bxf6 gxf6 16.e4 dxe4 17.Qg4+ Bg7 18.Rfd1 Qf8 19.Nd4 Bc8 20.Qh4 f5 21.Nc6 Re8 22.Bh3 Bh6 23.Rc2 e3 24.fxe3 Bxe3+ 25.Kh1 Be6 26.Bg2 a5 27.Bf3 Kh8 28.Nd4 Rad8 29.Rxc7 Bd5 30.Re1 Qd6 31.Rc2 Re4 32.Bxe4 Bxe4+ 33.Qxe4 fxe4 34.Nf5 Qb4 35.Rxe3 Rd1+ 36.Kg2 Rd2+ 37.Rxd2 Qxd2+ 38.Kh3 Qf2 39.Kg4 f6 0–1

=== Game 12: Bronstein–Botvinnik, 0–1 ===
Apr 10.

1.d4 e6 2.c4 f5 3.e3 Nf6 4.Nc3 d5 5.Nh3 c6 6.Bd2 Bd6 7.Qc2 0-0 8.0-0-0 Qe7 9.f3 dxc4 10.e4 fxe4 11.Nxe4 b5 12.Nxd6 Qxd6 13.f4 Na6 14.Be2 c5 15.Bf3 Rb8 16.Bc3 Nb4 17.dxc5 Nxa2+ 18.Kb1 Nxc3+ 19.Qxc3 Qxc5 20.Rhe1 h6 21.Re5 Qc7 22.g4 Bb7 23.Bxb7 Rxb7 24.g5 Nd5 25.Rdxd5 exd5 26.Qd4 c3 27.b3 Qd7 28.Nf2 c2 29.Kc1 hxg5 30.Rxg5 Qe6 31.Re5 Qd6 32.Kxc2 Rc7+ 33.Kd2 Qc5 34.Qxc5 Rxc5 35.Nd3 Rc6 36.Rxd5 a6 37.h4 Rh6 38.h5 Rhf6 39.b4 Rf5 40.Rd6 R8f6 0–1

=== Game 13: Botvinnik–Bronstein, ½–½ ===
Apr 13.

1.d4 Nf6 2. c4 e6 3. Nc3 Bb4 4. e3 b6 5. Nge2 Bb7 6.a3 Bxc3+ 7.Nxc3 0-0 8.Bd3 c5 9.d5 b5 10.0-0 bxc4 11.Bxc4 exd5 12.Nxd5 Nc6 13.b3 Nxd5 14.Bxd5 Rb8 15.Bb2 Ne7 16.Qg4 Ng6 17.Bxb7 Rxb7 18.b4 a5 19.Bc3 axb4 20.axb4 cxb4 21.Bxb4 Re8 22.Bc3 Qh4 23.Qf3 Rc7 24.Bd4 Nf8 25.Ra5 Ne6 26.Be5 Rc6 27.Bg3 Qc4 28.Rd5 Nc5 29.Rd4 Qe6 30.Qd5 h6 31.h3 Ra8 32.Rfd1 Qxd5 33.Rxd5 Ne4 34.Rxd7 Nxg3 35.fxg3 Ra2 36.R1d2 Rxd2 37.Rxd2 Kf8 38.g4 Ke7 39.Kf2 Rf6+ 40.Ke2 Ra6 41.Rd5 Ra2+ 42.Kf3 g5 43.Rf5 Kf8 44.Rf6 Kg7 45.Rd6 Rb2 46.g3 Ra2 47.h4 Rh2 48.Rd1 Kf6 49.e4 Kg6 50.h5+ Kf6 51.Rd6+ Kg7 52.e5 Rh1 53.e6 fxe6 54.Rxe6 Rf1+ 55.Ke4 Re1+ 56.Kd5 Rd1+ ½–½

=== Game 14: Bronstein–Botvinnik, ½–½ ===
Apr 15.

1.Nf3 e6 2.g3 d5 3.Bg2 c5 4.0-0 Nc6 5.d3 g6 6.e4 Bg7 7.Qe2 Nge7 8.e5 Qc7 9.Re1 h6 10.c3 Bd7 11.Na3 a6 12.Rb1 Nf5 13.Nc2 Rc8 14.h4 Qa5 15.a3 Qd8 16.Bf4 0-0 17.Ne3 Nxe3 18.Qxe3 Kh7 19.Nh2 Ne7 20.Ng4 Ng8 21.Qd2 Bc6 22.d4 cxd4 23.Qxd4 Bb5 24.b3 a5 25.a4 Ba6 26.Qd2 Qe7 27.b4 Bc4 28.bxa5 Ba6 29.Bf1 Qc5 30.Bb5 Qxc3 31.Qxc3 Rxc3 32.Bxa6 bxa6 33.Rb6 Rc4 34.Nh2 Ne7 35.Rxa6 Nc6 36.Nf3 Nb4 37.Rb6 Nd3 38.Ra1 Nxf4 39.gxf4 Rxf4 40.Kg2 g5 41.hxg5 hxg5 42.Nxg5+ Kg6 43.Nf3 Rg8 44.Ra3 Bf8 45.Rd3 Rxa4 46.Kf1 Ra1+ 47.Ke2 Ra2+ 48.Rd2 Rxa5 49.Rb8 Rh8 50.Nd4 Bg7 51.Rxh8 Bxh8 52.f4 Ra6 53.Rd1 Ra2+ 54.Kf3 Ra3+ 55.Kg4 Bg7 56.Kh4 Bf8 57.f5 exf5 58.Rg1+ Kh7 59.Nxf5 Ra6 60.Rg5 Bh6 61.Rg3 Re6 62.Rf3 Rxe5 63.Nxh6 Kxh6 64.Rxf7 Kg6 65.Rf4 Rf5 66.Kg4 ½–½

=== Game 15: Botvinnik–Bronstein, ½–½ ===
Apr 17.

1.d4 e6 2.e4 d5 3.Nd2 c5 4.exd5 exd5 5.Ngf3 Nf6 6.Bb5+ Bd7 7.Bxd7+ Nbxd7 8.0-0 Be7 9.dxc5 Nxc5 10.Nd4 Qd7 11.N2f3 0-0 12.Ne5 Qc8 13.Bg5 Re8 14.Nd3 Nxd3 15.Qxd3 Qg4 16.Be3 Bc5 17.h3 Qg6 18.Qxg6 hxg6 19.Rad1 Re4 20.c3 b6 21.Nc2 Rd8 22.Rd3 Kf8 23.Rfd1 Ke7 24.Kf1 Kd7 25.Bg5 Kc6 26.b4 Bf8 27.Ne3 Re5 28.f4 Re4 29.f5 Re5 30.Bf4 Re4 31.Bg5 Re5 32.Bf4 Re4 33.Bg5 ½–½

=== Game 16: Bronstein–Botvinnik, ½–½ ===
Apr 20.

1.d4 e6 2.c4 f5 3.g3 Nf6 4.Bg2 Be7 5.Nc3 0-0 6.e3 d5 7.Nge2 c6 8.b3 Bd6 9.0-0 Qe7 10.Qc2 Ne4 11.Nd1 Na6 12.Nb2 Bd7 13.c5 Bc7 14.Nd3 Be8 15.b4 Nb8 16.Bb2 a5 17.a3 Nd7 18.Ne5 Nef6 19.Nc1 g5 20.f3 g4 21.Ncd3 gxf3 22.Bxf3 Ne4 23.Rae1 Ndf6 24.Nf4 Kh8 25.Re2 Ng5 26.Bg2 Rg8 27.Bc3 Nge4 28.Be1 axb4 29.axb4 Nh5 30.Nfd3 Nhf6 31.Qb1 Bh5 32.Rb2 Be8 33.Ra2 Rxa2 34.Qxa2 Bb8 35.Qb2 h6 36.Nf4 Kh7 37.Kh1 Ng4 38.Nxg4 Rxg4 39.Bh3 Rg5 40.Qa1 Bf7 41.Bg2 Rg8 42.Bf3 Nf6 43.Qb2 Ng4 44.Qe2 Nf6 45.Rg1 Ne4 46.Rf1 Qe8 47.Qd3 Bxf4 48.exf4 Bh5 49.Qa3 Bxf3+ 50.Rxf3 Rg7 51.Kg2 Qd8 52.Kf1 Qf6 53.Rd3 h5 54.h4 Rg8 55.Rd1 Qg7 56.Qf3 Kh6 57.Kg2 Ra8 58.Rd3 Ra2+ 59.Kf1 Ra1 60.Qg2 Qg4 61.Qh2 Qg8 62.b5 Qa8 63.Qb2 Qa5 64.Re3 cxb5 65.Re2 Qa4 66.Kg2 Rd1 67.Bf2 Qc4 68.c6 Qxc6 69.Qb4 Qe8 70.Rc2 Rd3 71.Be1 Qg8 72.Qe7 Rxg3+ 73.Bxg3 Qxg3+ 74.Kh1 Qe1+ 75.Kh2 ½–½

=== Game 17: Botvinnik–Bronstein, 0–1 ===
Botvinnik–Bronstein, game 17

Position: g1 white king, f1 white knight, e1 white rook, d1 white queen, g2 white pawn, c2 white rook, b2 white bishop, h3 white pawn, f3 white pawn, e3 white pawn, d3 white knight, b3 white pawn, h4 black pawn, f4 black pawn, d4 white pawn, a4 white pawn, g5 black pawn, d5 black pawn, a5 black pawn, g6 black knight, f6 black bishop, e6 black queen, d6 black knight, b6 black pawn, e7 black rook, c7 black pawn, g8 black king, e8 black rook

Position after Bronstein's 29...f4!

Apr 22. Both players were in time trouble after move 27. Bronstein stated he used the strategy of making moves that "defy all logic", and that Botvinnik was "psychologically 'groggy'" after the opening. Bronstein made a breakthrough with 29...f4, with Botvinnik missing counter-chances and then blundering in an already "hopeless" position (Kmoch).

1. d4 Nf6 2. c4 e6 3. Nc3 Bb4 4. e3 b6 5. Nge2 Ba6 6.a3 Be7 7.Ng3 d5 8.cxd5 Bxf1 9.Nxf1 exd5 10.Ng3 Qd7 11.Qf3 Nc6 12.0-0 g6 13.Bd2 0-0 14.Nce2 h5 15.Rfc1 h4 16.Nf1 Ne4 17.Nf4 a5 18.Rc2 Bd8 19.Be1 Ne7 20.Qe2 Nd6 21.f3 g5 22.Nd3 Qe6 23.a4 Ng6 24.h3 f5 25.Bc3 Bf6 26.Re1 Rae8 27.Qd1 Rf7 28.b3 Rfe7 29.Bb2 f4 30.Ne5 Bxe5 31.dxe5 Nf7 32.exf4 Nxf4 33.Nh2 c5 34.Ng4 d4 35.Nf6+ Qxf6 0–1

=== Game 18: Bronstein–Botvinnik, ½–½ ===
Apr 24.

1.d4 d5 2.c4 c6 3.Nc3 Nf6 4.Nf3 e6 5.e3 a6 6.Bd3 b5 7.b3 Nbd7 8.0-0 Bb7 9.c5 Be7 10.a3 a5 11.Bb2 0-0 12.Qc2 g6 13.b4 axb4 14.axb4 Qc7 15.Rae1 Rfe8 16.Ne2 Bf8 17.h3 Bg7 18.Ne5 Nf8 19.f3 N6d7 20.f4 f6 21.Nf3 Re7 22.Nc3 f5 23.Ra1 Ree8 24.Ne5 Rxa1 25.Rxa1 Ra8 26.Qb1 Qc8 27.Bxb5 Nxe5 28.fxe5 Bh6 29.Bc1 cxb5 30.Nxb5 Nd7 31.Nd6 Rxa1 32.Qxa1 Qa8 33.Qc3 Bf8 34.b5 Bxd6 35.exd6 Qa4 36.Qb2 Kf7 37.Kh2 h6 38.e4 f4 39.e5 g5 40.Qe2 Kg7 41.Qd3 Nb8 42.h4 Qc4 43.Qh3 Qxb5 44.hxg5 hxg5 45.Qxe6 Qd3 46.Qf6+ Kh7 47.Qf7+ Kh8 48.Qf6+ Kh7 49.Bxf4 gxf4 50.Qf7+ Kh8 51.Qe8+ Kg7 52.Qe7+ Kh8 53.Qe8+ Kh7 54.Qe7+ Kh8 55.Qf8+ Kh7 56.Qf7+ Kh8 57.Qxb7 Qg3+ 58.Kh1 ½–½

=== Game 19: Botvinnik–Bronstein, 1–0 ===
Botvinnik–Bronstein, game 19

Position: d8 white bishop, f8 black king, g6 black pawn, a5 white pawn, g5 white pawn, h5 black pawn, d4 black bishop, d3 white bishop, e3 black knight, f3 white king

Position after Botvinnik's 53...Bd3!, winning the g-pawn. Kf7 is met with Bb6 and Kg7 with Bf6+.

Apr 27. Botvinnik obtains the bishop pair and the queenside majority. After missing multiple chances to draw, Bronstein loses his g-pawn. Hans Kmoch called Bronstein's inability to draw with ease a "characteristic failure", citing games 6, 8 and 12 which Bronstein had also lost in drawn positions.

1.d4 Nf6 2.c4 g6 3.g3 Bg7 4.Bg2 d5 5.cxd5 Nxd5 6.Nf3 0-0 7.0-0 c5 8.e4 Nf6 9.e5 Nd5 10.dxc5 Nb4 11.Nc3 N8c6 12.a3 Nd3 13.Be3 Bg4 14.h3 Bxf3 15.Qxf3 Ndxe5 16.Qe4 Qd3 17.Qa4 Qc4 18.Rad1 Rad8 19.Bd5 Qxa4 20.Nxa4 e6 21.Ba2 Nf3+ 22.Kg2 Nfd4 23.g4 h6 24.Rd2 Kh7 25.f4 f5 26.Nc3 e5 27.fxe5 Bxe5 28.Nd5 fxg4 29.hxg4 Rxf1 30.Kxf1 Rf8+ 31.Rf2 Rxf2+ 32.Bxf2 a6 33.Kg2 Kg7 34.Bc4 Ne6 35.b4 Bb2 36.a4 Ne5 37.Be2 Bd4 38.Bg3 a5 39.bxa5 Nxc5 40.Nc7 Nc6 41.a6 bxa6 42.Nxa6 Ne4 43.Bc7 Nc3 44.Bf3 Ne5 45.a5 h5 46.g5 Nc4 47.Nb4 Nb5 48.Bd8 Kf8 49.Nc6 Bc5 50.Be2 Ne3+ 51.Kf3 Nd4+ 52.Nxd4 Bxd4 53.Bd3 Ng4 54.Bxg6 Ne5+ 55.Ke4 Nc6 56.Bb6 Bxb6 57.axb6 h4 58.Bf5 Ke7 59.Kf4 Kd6 60.Be4 1–0

=== Game 20: Bronstein–Botvinnik, ½–½ ===
Apr 29.

1.c4 e6 2.Nf3 Nf6 3.g3 b6 4.Bg2 Bb7 5.0-0 Be7 6.b3 0-0 7.Bb2 d5 8.cxd5 exd5 9.Qc2 Re8 10.e3 Nbd7 11.d3 Bf8 12.Nc3 a6 13.Rad1 b5 14.a4 b4 15.Ne2 c5 16.Nd2 Ne5 17.Nf4 Rc8 18.Qb1 a5 19.Rfe1 Rc7 20.d4 Ng6 21.Nxg6 hxg6 22.dxc5 Bxc5 23.Qa1 Qe7 24.Rc1 Ng4 25.Bd4 Rec8 26.Nf3 Nf6 27.Bh3 Bxd4 28.Nxd4 Rxc1 29.Rxc1 Rxc1+ 30.Qxc1 Ne4 31.Bc8 Nc3 32.Bxb7 Qxb7 33.f3 Kf8 34.Qf1 Qc8 35.Kg2 g5 36.g4 g6 37.Qe1 Qe8 38.Qd2 Qe5 39.Qd3 Qf6 40.Nc2 Ke7 41.Qd4 Qxd4 42.Nxd4 Nd1 43.Nc2 Nb2 44.Nd4 Nd1 45.Nc2 Nb2 46.Nd4 ½–½

=== Game 21: Botvinnik–Bronstein, 0–1 ===
May 4.

1.d4 Nf6 2.c4 d6 3.Nc3 e5 4.Nf3 Nbd7 5.g3 g6 6.Bg2 Bg7 7.0-0 0-0 8.e4 c6 9.h3 Nh5 10.Be3 Qe7 11.Nh2 Kh8 12.Re1 a6 13.a3 Rb8 14.Bf1 Nhf6 15.Qd2 b5 16.cxb5 axb5 17.Rad1 Nb6 18.Bh6 Bxh6 19.Qxh6 Be6 20.Nf3 Bb3 21.Rd2 Nfd7 22.Qe3 Bc4 23.Bg2 f6 24.Rc2 Bb3 25.Rce2 Nc4 26.Qd3 Na5 27.Rd2 Nb6 28.Qb1 Nbc4 29.Rde2 b4 30.axb4 Rxb4 31.h4 Nb6 32.Na2 Bxa2 33.Qxa2 Nbc4 34.h5 Rfb8 35.hxg6 hxg6 36.Qb1 Kg7 37.dxe5 fxe5 38.Qc1 Nxb2 39.Qc3 Na4 40.Qc1 Rc4 41.Qg5 Qxg5 42.Nxg5 Nb3 43.f4 Nd4 44.Ra2 Rb2 45.Rxb2 Nxb2 46.Kh2 Nd3 47.Re3 Rc3 48.Bf1 Rc2+ 49.Kh3 Nf2+ 50.Kh4 Rc1 51.Bg2 Rg1 52.Bh3 Rh1 53.fxe5 dxe5 54.Ra3 Kf6 55.Nh7+ Ke7 56.Ng5 Kd6 57.Nf7+ Ke7 58.Kg5 Kxf7 59.Ra7+ Ke8 60.Bd7+ Kd8 61.Kxg6 Nxe4 62.g4 Rf1 63.Bf5 Nxf5 64.gxf5 Ke8 0–1

=== Game 22: Bronstein–Botvinnik, 1–0 ===
Bronstein–Botvinnik, game 22

Position: b8 black rook, e8 black bishop, g8 black queen, h8 black king, a7 white rook, h7 black pawn, c6 black pawn, b5 black pawn, e5 black bishop, b4 white pawn, e4 black pawn, g4 black pawn, b3 white queen, e3 white pawn, g3 white bishop, h2 white pawn, f1 white rook, g1 white king

Position after Bronstein's 37...Bg3!

May 6. Bronstein conducts a brilliant attack against Botvinnik's kingside with 32...g4. Hans Kmoch referred to 34...Bh4 as a "killer" and 37...Bg3 as a "super-killer". After this win, Bronstein only needs two more draws or one win to become the world champion.

1.d4 e6 2.c4 f5 3.g3 Nf6 4.Bg2 Be7 5.Nc3 0-0 6.e3 d5 7.Nge2 c6 8.b3 Ne4 9.0-0 Nd7 10.Bb2 Ndf6 11.Qd3 g5 12.cxd5 exd5 13.f3 Nxc3 14.Bxc3 g4 15.fxg4 Nxg4 16.Bh3 Nh6 17.Nf4 Bd6 18.b4 a6 19.a4 Qe7 20.Rab1 b5 21.Bg2 Ng4 22.Bd2 Nf6 23.Rb2 Bd7 24.Ra1 Ne4 25.Be1 Rfe8 26.Qb3 Kh8 27.Rba2 Qf8 28.Nd3 Rab8 29.axb5 axb5 30.Ra7 Re7 31.Ne5 Be8 32.g4 fxg4 33.Bxe4 dxe4 34.Bh4 Rxe5 35.dxe5 Bxe5 36.Rf1 Qg8 37.Bg3 Bg7 38.Qxg8+ 1–0

=== Game 23: Botvinnik–Bronstein, 1–0 ===
Botvinnik–Bronstein, game 23

Position: b7 black pawn, h7 black pawn, a6 black knight, b6 black pawn, c6 black knight, e6 black pawn, f6 black king, d5 black pawn, f5 black pawn, a4 white pawn, d4 white pawn, e4 white pawn, c3 white king, f3 white pawn, g3 white bishop, h2 white pawn, b1 white bishop

Position after Botvinniks's 44...Bg3!! which announces zugzwang.

May 8. Botvinnik obtained the bishop pair and tried to create pressure in a drawn endgame. Botvinnik reflected that "the loss of the match seemed certain" if he did not win this game with the white pieces. He stated that the audience applauded when Bronstein won a pawn (36...Nxb3+), but that Bronstein knew he had made a mistake from his [Botvinnik's] "joyful face". Botvinnik sealed the move 42...Bd6, reflecting that this was "weaker", and that he had a winning possibility in 42...Bb1. Botvinnik described experiencing palpitations during the adjournment analysis due to "emotional stress". He stated that 44...Bg3 had been a surprise for Bronstein, who could have "most likely" become world champion if he had spotted 43...Na7. Instead Bronstein played the "natural" 43...Kf6. Botvinnik proceeded to put Bronstein in zugzwang, tying the score.

1.d4 Nf6 2.c4 g6 3.g3 c6 4.Bg2 d5 5.cxd5 cxd5 6.Nc3 Bg7 7.Nh3 Bxh3 8.Bxh3 Nc6 9.Bg2 e6 10.e3 0-0 11.Bd2 Rc8 12.0-0 Nd7 13.Ne2 Qb6 14.Bc3 Rfd8 15.Nf4 Nf6 16.Qb3 Ne4 17.Qxb6 axb6 18.Be1 Na5 19.Nd3 Bf8 20.f3 Nd6 21.Bf2 Bh6 22.Rac1 Nac4 23.Rfe1 Na5 24.Kf1 Bg7 25.g4 Nc6 26.b3 Nb5 27.Ke2 Bf8 28.a4 Nc7 29.Bg3 Na6 30.Bf1 f6 31.Red1 Na5 32.Rxc8 Rxc8 33.Rc1 Rxc1 34.Nxc1 Ba3 35.Kd1 Bxc1 36.Kxc1 Nxb3+ 37.Kc2 Na5 38.Kc3 Kf7 39.e4 f5 40.gxf5 gxf5 41.Bd3 Kg6 42.Bd6 Nc6 43.Bb1 Kf6 44.Bg3 fxe4 45.fxe4 h6 46.Bf4 h5 47.exd5 exd5 48.h4 Nab8 49.Bg5+ Kf7 50.Bf5 Na7 51.Bf4 Nbc6 52.Bd3 Nc8 53.Be2 Kg6 54.Bd3+ Kf6 55.Be2 Kg6 56.Bf3 N6e7 57.Bg5 1–0

=== Game 24: Bronstein–Botvinnik, ½–½ ===
Bronstein–Botvinnik, game 24

Position: g1 white king, h2 white pawn, g2 white pawn, f2 white pawn, b2 white pawn, g3 white queen, e3 white rook, d3 white rook, c3 white knight, d4 white bishop, c4 white bishop, b4 black bishop, a4 white pawn, h6 black pawn, f6 black knight, e6 black pawn, c6 black pawn, g7 black pawn, f7 black pawn, e7 black queen, b7 black bishop, a7 black pawn, h8 black king, d8 black rook, a8 black rook

Position before Botvinnik's 19...Rxd4! which defused Bronstein's attack.

May 11. Botvinnik demonstrated "remarkable courage and self-confidence" by responding with the complex Anti-Meran Gambit (Kmoch). This was a must win game for Bronstein who sacrificed two pawns. However, Botvinnik's defensive 19...Rxd4 ended all hope for Bronstein's attack, and they agreed to a draw in a position where Botvinnik already had the advantage. Botvinnik retained his title.

1.d4 d5 2.c4 c6 3.Nc3 Nf6 4.Nf3 e6 5.Bg5 dxc4 6.a4 Bb4 7.e4 c5 8.Bxc4 cxd4 9.Nxd4 h6 10.Be3 Nxe4 11.0-0 Nf6 12.Qf3 0-0 13.Rad1 Qe7 14.Rfe1 Nc6 15.Qg3 Kh8 16.Nxc6 bxc6 17.Bd4 Rd8 18.Rd3 Bb7 19.Ree3 Rxd4 20.Rxd4 Bc5 21.Rd1 Bxe3 22.Qxe3 ½–½
