= The Magician's Apprentice =

The Magician's Apprentice may refer to:

- "The Sorcerer's Apprentice" (German: "Der Zauberlehrling"), 1797 poem by Johann Wolfgang von Goethe
- The Magician's Apprentice (novel), a 2007 fantasy novel by Trudi Canavan
- "The Magician's Apprentice" (Doctor Who), a 2015 episode
- "The Magician's Apprentice", a 2017 short story by Tamsyn Muir

== See also ==
- Sorcerer's Apprentice (disambiguation)
