= Olga Ignatieva =

Soviet chess player (1920–1999)

Personal information
- Born: Olga Mikhailovna Ignatieva; October 16, 1920 Saint Petersburg Governorate, Russia
- Died: 1999 (aged 78–79) Russia

Chess career
- Country: Soviet Union
- Title: Woman Grandmaster (1978)
- Peak rating: 2190 (January 1976)

Olga Mikhailovna Ignatieva (October 16, 1920, Saint Petersburg Governorate, Russia – 1999 was a Soviet chess player.

== Career ==
Olga Ignatieva participated in Women's Soviet Championship 17 times. Her best results: 1945 – 5th–6th, 1947 – 4th, 1951 – 2nd, 1956 – 5th, 1957 – 5th – 7th places. She was one of the leading Soviet Women players in the 1950s and shared 2nd place in the Women's Candidates tournament in 1952. But in following Women's Candidates tournament in 1955 she was only 10th. Also Ignatieva won Leningrad City Chess Championship for women in 1941, 1949 and 1950, Moscow City Chess Championship for women in 1956 and 1957, and Latvian Chess Championship for women in 1957. Ignatieva's Woman International Master title was awarded in 1952 and her Woman Grandmaster title in 1978. She also became an International Arbiter in 1972. For some years she was married to Soviet Grandmaster and World Title Challenger David Bronstein.
