= László Szabó (chess player) =

Hungarian chess grandmaster (1917–1998)

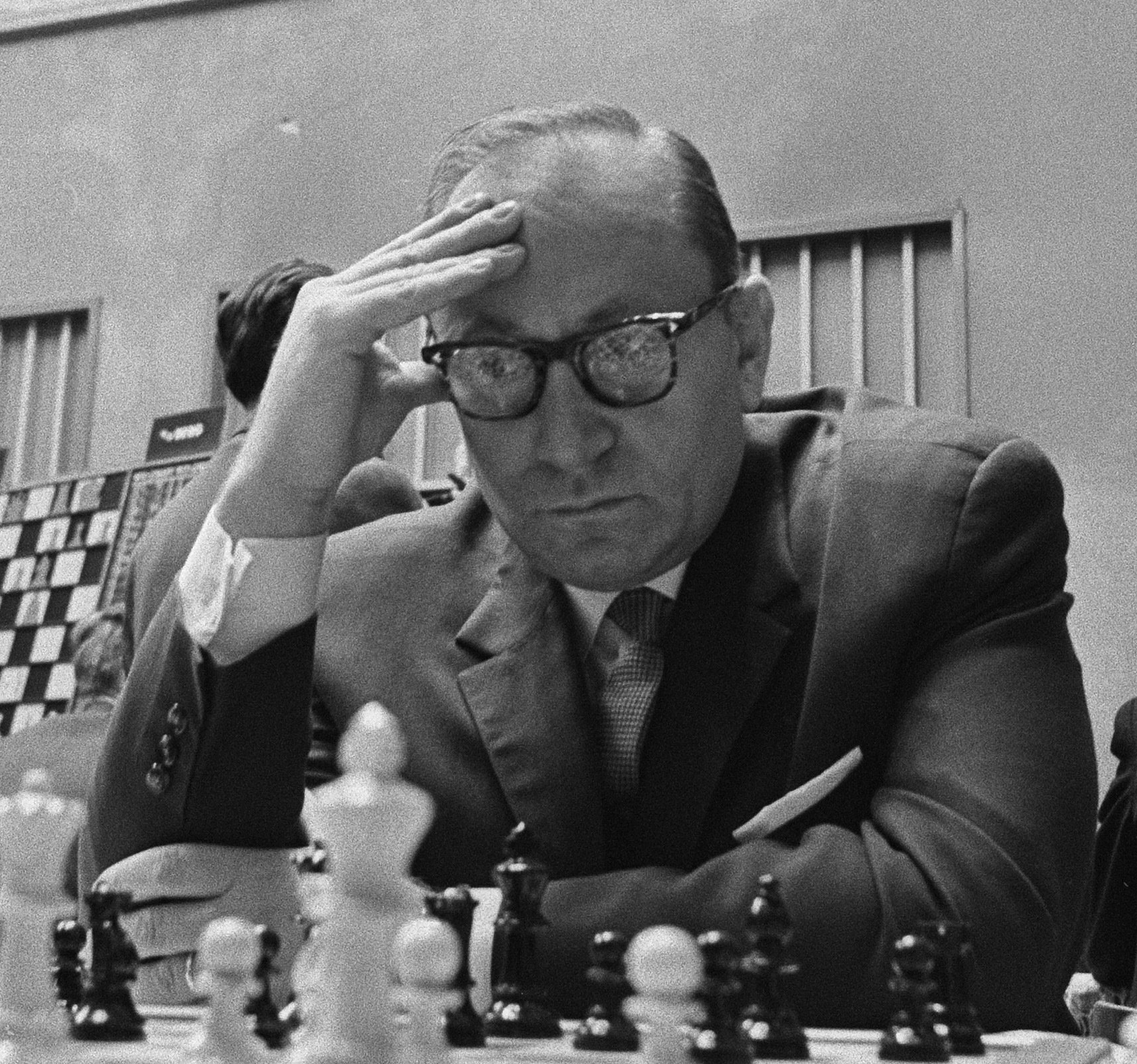
- Szabó in 1966

Personal information
- Born: March 19, 1917 Budapest, Kingdom of Hungary
- Died: August 8, 1998 (aged 81) Budapest, Hungary

Chess career
- Country: Hungary
- Title: Grandmaster (1950)
- Peak rating: 2565 (July 1973)
- Peak ranking: No. 28 (July 1973)

László Szabó ([ˈsɒboː ˈlaːsloː] March 19, 1917 – August 8, 1998) was a Hungarian chess player. He was awarded the title of International Grandmaster in 1950, when it was instituted by FIDE.

== Biography ==
Born in Budapest, Szabó burst onto the international chess scene in 1935, at the age of 18, winning the first of Hungarian Championships, an international tournament in Tatatóváros, and was selected to represent his country at the Warsaw Chess Olympiad. It is thought that the young Szabó studied under Géza Maróczy, then a patriarchal figure in Hungarian chess who had previously trained future world champions, Max Euwe and Vera Menchik.

Prior to World War II, there were other successes, including a gold medal at the 3rd unofficial Chess Olympiad in 1936 as part of the Hungarian team and outright victory at Hastings 1938/39 (a tournament he was to hold a long association with). He began a career as a banker, dealing in foreign exchange.

At the outbreak of war, Szabó was attached to a Forced Labour Unit and was later captured by Russian troops who held him as a prisoner of war. After the war, he returned to chess and played many major international events. He finished fifth at Groningen 1946, a tournament which included Mikhail Botvinnik, Max Euwe, Vasily Smyslov, Miguel Najdorf, Isaac Boleslavsky and Alexander Kotov. At the Saltsjöbaden Interzonal of 1948, he finished second to David Bronstein and took outright first place at Hastings 1947/48, Budapest 1948 and Hastings 1949/50. A share of fifth place at both the Saltsjöbaden 1952 Interzonal and the Gothenburg Interzonal of 1955, meant that each of his Interzonal finishes had been strong enough to merit him a place in the corresponding Candidates Tournament. It was at his third and final Candidates, held in Amsterdam in 1956, that Szabó made his most promising bid for a World Championship title challenge. He tied for third place with Bronstein, Efim Geller, Tigran Petrosian and Boris Spassky, behind Smyslov and Paul Keres.

Into the 1960s and 1970s, he continued to excel in international competition; first at Zagreb 1964, first at Budapest 1965 (with Lev Polugaevsky and Mark Taimanov), first at Sarajevo 1972, first at Hilversum 1973 (with Geller) and tied for first at Hastings 1973/74 (with Gennady Kuzmin, Jan Timman and Mikhail Tal). The last tournament that he participated in was Jubiliee tournament in Groningen in 1996.

In total, he represented Hungary at eleven Chess Olympiads, playing first board on five occasions and delivering many medal-winning performances. In 1937, he took the team silver and individual silver medals, in 1952 an individual bronze, in 1956 a team bronze and in 1966, team bronze and individual silver.

In a 1961 item of the Hungarian sports newsreel Magyar Sporthíradó, published by Budapest Filmstúdió, Szabó and István Bilek participated in a live-chess exhibition in which performers represented the pieces on a large board.

Szabó was the best player in Hungary for nearly 20 years (eventually being succeeded by Lajos Portisch around 1963/64.) Chessmetrics.com, which attempts to rank players, suggests that Szabo was sixth in the world in 1946.

His family donated Szabó's entire chess library and his papers to the Cleveland Public Library John G. White Chess and Checkers Collection. The John G. White Collection of Chess and Checkers is the largest chess library in the world (32,568 volumes of books and serials, including 6,359 volumes of bound periodicals.)

== See also ==
- List of Jewish chess players

== Books ==
- Meine besten Partien (German, 248 pages, paperback, 1990.) (https://www.schachversand.de/e/listen/autoren/243.html)
- My best games of chess (English, 209 pages, hardback, 1986.) (https://www.schachversand.de/e/listen/autoren/V243.html)
