= Sorcerer's Apprentice (Augiéras novel) =

1964 novel by François Augiéras

- Author: François Augiéras
- Original title: L'apprenti sorcier
- Translator: Sue Dyson
- Language: French
- Genre: Novel
- Publisher: Éditions Julliard
- Publication date: 1964
- Publication place: France
- English publication date: 2001
- Media type: Hardback and paperback
- ISBN: 978-1-901285-44-4

The Sorcerer's Apprentice (French: L'apprenti sorcier) is a novel by François Augiéras. First published in France in 1964 as L'apprenti sorcier, it was translated into English by Sue Dyson in 2001 and published by Pushkin Press.

== Plot summary ==
The novel is set in the Sarladais (the Dordogne region of France). An adolescent boy is sent to live with a 35-year-old priest, who becomes his teacher and spiritual mentor, and exerts a powerful control over the boy. He abuses him physically and sexually, but the boy willingly accepts his 'punishment.' The boy falls in love with a slightly younger, and very beautiful boy, meeting in secret and having sex.

This disturbing story is much more than a tale of a sexually violent predator. The adolescent himself experiences sexual activity with the other boy, but this relationship is one of genuine love and affection, rather than the coercive, harmful abuse he is subjected to by the priest.
