= David Bronstein =

Soviet chess grandmaster (1924–2006)

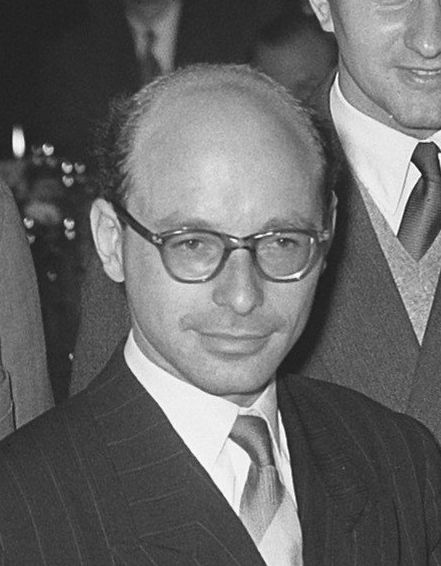
- Bronstein in 1954

Personal information
- Born: David Ionovich Bronstein; February 19, 1924 Bila Tserkva, Ukrainian SSR, Soviet Union
- Died: December 5, 2006 (aged 82) Minsk, Belarus

Chess career
- Country: Soviet Union → Russia
- Title: Grandmaster (1950)
- Peak rating: 2595 (May 1974)
- Peak ranking: No. 17 (July 1971)

David Ionovich Bronstein (Russian: Дави́д Ио́нович Бронште́йн; February 19, 1924 – December 5, 2006) was a Soviet and Russian chess player. Awarded the title of International Grandmaster by FIDE in 1950, he narrowly missed becoming World Chess Champion in 1951. Bronstein was one of the world's strongest players from the mid-1940s into the mid-1970s, and was described by his peers as a creative genius and master of tactics. He was also a renowned chess writer; his book Zurich International Chess Tournament 1953 is widely considered one of the greatest chess books ever written.

== Early life ==
David Bronstein was born in Bila Tserkva, Ukrainian SSR, Soviet Union, to Jewish parents. Growing up in a poor family, he learned chess at the age of six from his grandfather. As a youth in Kiev, he was trained by the renowned International Master Alexander Konstantinopolsky. He finished second in the Kiev Championship when he was only 15, and achieved the Soviet Master title at the age of 16 for his second-place result in the 1940 Ukrainian SSR Chess Championship, behind Isaac Boleslavsky, with whom he became close friends both on and off the chessboard. His first wife was Olga Ignatieva, one of the strongest female chess players of the 1950s. He went on to marry Boleslavsky's daughter, Tatiana, in 1984.

After completing high school in spring 1941, his plans to study mathematics at Kiev University were interrupted by the spread of World War II throughout eastern Europe in the early 1940s. He had begun play in the 1941 semifinal of the Soviet Championship, but this event was cancelled as war began. Shortly after the war's conclusion, he began attending Leningrad Polytechnical Institute where he studied for approximately one year.

Judged unfit for military service, Bronstein spent the war performing various jobs; this included doing some reconstruction of war-damaged buildings, and other jobs of a clerical or laboring nature. Also during the war, his father, Johonon, was unfairly imprisoned for several years in the Gulag system and was detained without substantial evidence of committing any crimes, it was later revealed. The rumor that Bronstein was related to the former Soviet leader Leon Trotsky (whose real family name was Bronstein) was treated as unconfirmed, yet doubtful, by Bronstein in his book The Sorcerer's Apprentice (1995). This belief could have explained the imprisonment of Bronstein's father.

== Towards Grandmaster ==
With the tide turning towards an eventual Soviet war victory over the Nazi invaders, Bronstein was able to once again play some competitive chess. His first top-standard Soviet event was the 1944 USSR Championship, where he won his individual game against eventual winner (and soon-to-be world champion) Mikhail Botvinnik. Bronstein moved to Moscow as the war wound up. Then seen as a promising but essentially unproven young player, one of dozens in the deep Soviet vanguard, he raised his playing level dramatically to place third in the 1945 USSR Championship. This result earned him a place on the Soviet team; he won both his games played on board ten, helping the Soviet team achieve victory in the famous 1945 US vs. USSR radio chess match. He then competed successfully in several team matches, and gradually proved he belonged in the Soviet chess elite. Bronstein tied for first place in the Soviet Championships of both 1948 and 1949.

== World Title Challenger (1948–1951) ==
Bronstein's first major international tournament success occurred at the Saltsjöbaden Interzonal of 1948, which he won. His qualifying place in this event came through nominations from foreign chess federations. He earned his Grandmaster title in 1950, when FIDE, the World Chess Federation, formalized the process. His Interzonal win qualified him for the Candidates' Tournament of 1950 in Budapest. Bronstein became the eventual Candidates' winner over Boleslavsky in a (Moscow) 1950 playoff match, following two overtime match games, after the two had tied in Budapest, and then again remained level over the 12 scheduled match games.

The period 1945–1950 saw a meteoric rise in Bronstein's development, as he reached the World Chess Championship challenge match, in 1951.

== 1951 World Championship match against Botvinnik ==
Bronstein is widely considered to be one of the greatest players not to have won the World Championship. He came close to that goal when he tied the 1951 World Championship match 12–12 with Mikhail Botvinnik, the reigning champion. Each player won five games, and the remaining 14 games were drawn.

In a match where the lead swung back and forth several times, the two players tested each other in a wide variety of opening formations, and every game (except the 24th) was full-blooded and played hard to a clear finish. Bronstein often avoided lines he had favoured in earlier events, and frequently adopted Botvinnik's own preferred variations. This strategy seemed to catch Botvinnik by surprise; the champion had not played competitively for three years since winning the title in 1948. The quality of play was very high by both players, although Botvinnik would later complain of his own weak play. He only grudgingly acknowledged Bronstein's huge talent. Bronstein claimed four of his five match wins by deep combinational play, winning before adjournment in highly complex fashion. He led by one point with two games to go, but lost the 23rd game and drew the final (24th) game. Under FIDE rules, the title remained with the holder, and Bronstein was never to come so close again.

Botvinnik wrote that Bronstein's failure was caused by a tendency to underestimate endgame technique, and a lack of ability in simple positions. Botvinnik won four virtually level endgames after the adjournments, and his fifth win came in an endgame that Bronstein resigned at move 40. These adjourned games made up four of Botvinnik's five match wins; Botvinnik had no more than a minimal advantage in these games when they were adjourned at move 40.

Bronstein's father was sometimes secretly in the audience during the 1951 title match games, at a time when he was not officially permitted in Moscow.

== 1953 Candidates ==
Bronstein challenged throughout at the 1953 Candidates Tournament in Switzerland and finished tied for second-through-fourth places, together with Paul Keres and Samuel Reshevsky, two points behind the winner Vasily Smyslov. Bronstein's book on the tournament is considered a classic.

It has been speculated that there was pressure on the Soviet players to collude, to ensure that a Soviet player would win. Even in the wake of glasnost, however, Bronstein only partially confirmed these rumors in his public statements or writings, admitting only to 'strong psychological pressure' being applied, and that it was up to Bronstein himself whether to decide to give in to this pressure. In his final book Secret Notes, published in 2007, shortly after his death, Bronstein went further and alleged that he and Keres were pressured to draw their games with Smyslov, in order to ensure that Smyslov would win ahead of Reshevsky (see World Chess Championship 1954 § Allegations of Soviet collusion).

== Career after 1953 ==
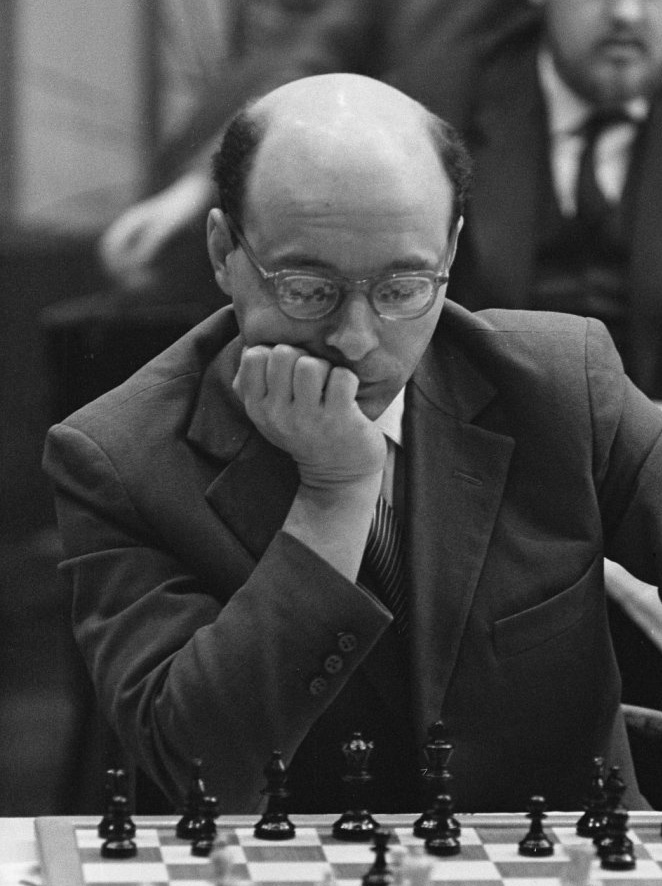
Bronstein in 1963

The 1953 Candidates result qualified him directly for the 1955 Gothenburg Interzonal, which he won with an unbeaten score. From there it was on to another near miss in the 1956 Candidates' tournament in Amsterdam, where he wound up in a large tie for third through seventh places, behind winner Smyslov and runner-up Keres.

Bronstein had to qualify for the 1958 Interzonal, and did so by placing third at the USSR Championship, Riga, 1958. At the 1958 Interzonal in Portorož, Bronstein, who had been picked as clear pre-event favourite by Bobby Fischer, missed moving on to the 1959 Candidates' by half a point, dropping a last-round game to the much weaker Filipino Rodolfo Tan Cardoso, when the electrical power failed due to a thunderstorm during the game, and he was unable to regain concentration. Bronstein missed qualification at the Soviet Zonal stage for the 1962 cycle. Then at the Amsterdam 1964 Interzonal, Bronstein scored very well, but only three Soviets could advance, by a FIDE rule, and he finished behind countrymen Smyslov, Mikhail Tal, and Boris Spassky, who finished as the joint winners, along with Larsen. His last Interzonal was at age 49 when he finished sixth at Petropolis 1973.

Bronstein took many first prizes in tournaments, among the most notable being the Soviet Chess Championships of 1948 (jointly with Alexander Kotov) and 1949 (jointly with Smyslov). He also tied for second place at the Soviet Championships of 1957 and 1964–65. He tied first with Mark Taimanov at the World Students' Championship in 1952 at Liverpool. Bronstein was also a six-time winner of the Moscow Championships, and represented the USSR at the Olympiads of 1952, 1954, 1956 and 1958, winning board prizes at each of them, and losing just one of his 49 games in those events. Along the way he won four Olympiad team gold medals. In the 1954 team match against the US (held in New York), Bronstein scored an almost unheard-of sweep at this level of play, winning all four of his games on second board.

Further major tournament victories were achieved at Hastings 1953–54, Belgrade 1954, Gotha 1957, Moscow 1959, Szombathely 1966, East Berlin 1968, Dnepropetrovsk 1970, Sarajevo 1971, Sandomierz 1976, Iwonicz Zdrój 1976, Budapest 1977, and Jūrmala 1978.

== Legacy and later years ==
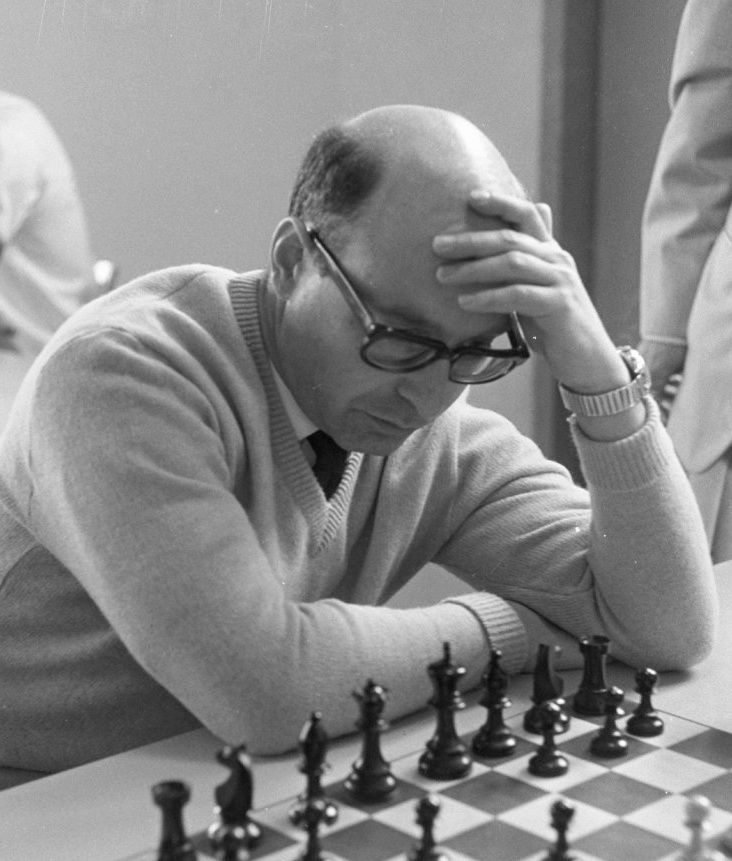
Bronstein in 1968

David Bronstein wrote many chess books and articles, and had a regular chess column in the Soviet newspaper Izvestia for many years. He was perhaps most highly regarded for his famous authorship of Zurich International Chess Tournament 1953 (English translation 1979). This book was an enormous seller in the USSR, going through many reprints, and is regarded among the very best chess books ever written. In 1995, he co-authored the autobiographical The Sorcerer's Apprentice, with his friend Tom Fürstenberg. Both have become landmarks in chess publishing history; Bronstein sought to amplify the ideas behind the players' moves rather than burdening the reader with pages of analysis of moves that never made it onto the scoresheet. Bronstein's romantic vision of chess was shown with his very successful adoption of the rarely seen King's Gambit in top-level competition. His pioneering theoretical and practical work (along with Boleslavsky and Efim Geller) in transforming the King's Indian Defence from a distrusted, obscure variation into a popular major system should be remembered, and is evidenced in his key contribution to the 1999 book Bronstein on the King's Indian. Bronstein played an exceptionally wide variety of openings during his long career, on a scale comparable with anyone else who ever reached the top level.

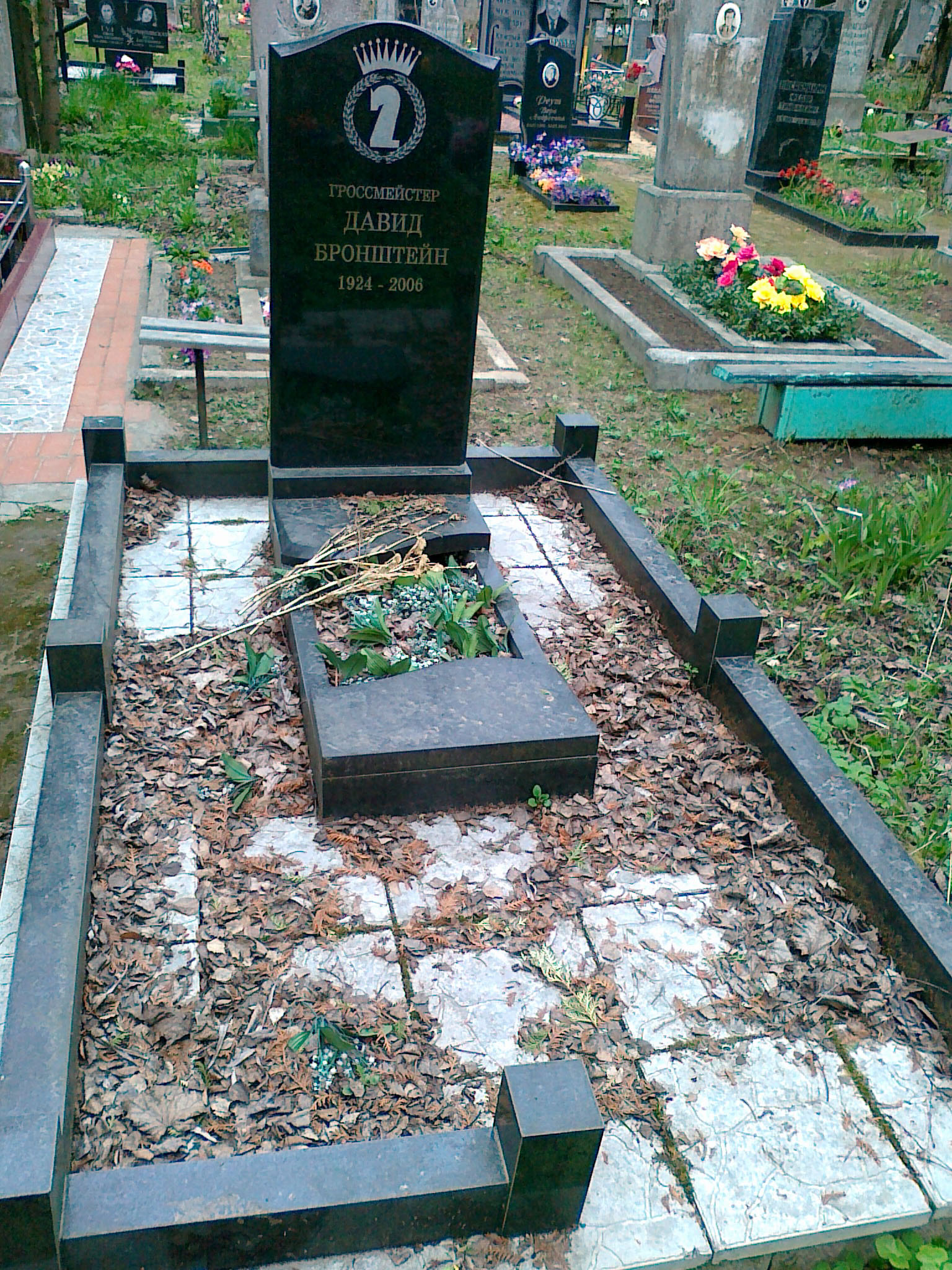
Bronstein's grave in Minsk, Belarus

Two more variations are named after him. In the Caro–Kann Defence, the Bronstein–Larsen Variation goes 1.e4 c6 2.d4 d5 3.Nc3 dxe4 4.Nxe4 Nf6 5.Nxf6+ gxf6. In the Scandinavian Defence, the Bronstein Variation goes 1.e4 d5 2.exd5 Qxd5 3.Nc3 Qd8.

Bronstein refused to sign a group letter denouncing the 1976 defection of Viktor Korchnoi, and he paid a personal price for this independence, as his state-paid Master's stipend was suspended, and he was also barred from major tournaments for more than a year. He was virtually banned from high-class events for several years in the mid-1980s.

Bronstein was a chess visionary. He was an early advocate of speeding up competitive chess. In 1973 he introduced the idea of adding a small time increment for each move made, a variant of which has become very popular and is implemented on almost all digital chess clocks. He challenged computer programs at every opportunity, usually achieving good results.

Bronstein enjoyed experimenting with unusual and offbeat openings such as the King's Gambit and Latvian Gambit; however, he generally did not play them in serious games. Like most grandmasters of the 1950s–1960s, he favoured Queen's pawn openings such as the Queen's Gambit, King's Indian Defence and Nimzo-Indian Defence, but also played e4 openings, especially the Ruy Lopez, French Defence, and Sicilian Defence. Although he had an extensive knowledge of openings and opening theory, his endgame technique was considered less reliable.

In later years Bronstein continued to stay active in tournament play, often in Western Europe after the breakup of the USSR. He maintained a very good standard (jointly winning the Hastings Swiss of 1994–95 at the age of 70), wrote several important chess books, and inspired young and old alike with endless simultaneous displays, a warm, gracious attitude, and glorious tales of his own rich chess heritage. Bronstein died on December 5, 2006, in Minsk, Belarus, of complications from high blood pressure.

His final book, nearly complete when he died, was published in 2007: Secret Notes, by David Bronstein and Sergei Voronkov, Zürich 2007, Edition Olms, ISBN 978-3-283-00464-4. In its introduction, Garry Kasparov, a fervent admirer of Bronstein's chess contributions, offers his opinion that Bronstein, based on his play, should have won the 1951 match against Botvinnik.

=== Books ===
- The Chess Struggle in Practice: Lessons from the Famous Zurich Candidates Tournament of 1953, 1978, ISBN 978-0679130642
- 200 Open Games, 1991, ISBN 978-0486268576
- The Modern Chess Self-Tutor, 1995, ISBN 978-1857441369
- The Sorcerer's Apprentice, 1995, ISBN 978-1857441512
- Bronstein on the King's Indian, 1999, ISBN 978-1857442656
- Secret Notes, 2007, ISBN 978-3283004644

=== Best combination ===
During the 1962 Moscow vs. Leningrad Match Bronstein played the top board for the Moscow team. With the white pieces he defeated Viktor Korchnoi in a game that ended with a tactic he later described as "one of the best combinations in my life, if not the best".

Position: b8 white queen, g7 black pawn, g6 black king, h6 white rook, g4 white pawn, b3 black pawn, f3 black queen, b2 white pawn, d2 black rook, g2 white pawn, h2 white king

Final position after 39.Rxh6+
1.e4 e5 2.Nf3 Nc6 3.Bb5 a6 4.Ba4 Nf6 5.0-0 Nxe4 6.d4 b5 7.Bb3 d5 8.dxe5 Be6 9.c3 Be7 10.Bc2 0-0 11.Qe2 f5 12.exf6 Bxf6 13.Nbd2 Bf5 14.Nxe4 Bxe4 15.Bxe4 dxe4 16.Qxe4 Qd7 17.Bf4 Rae8 18.Qc2 Bh4 19.Bg3 Bxg3 20.hxg3 Ne5 21.Nxe5 Rxe5 22.Rfe1 Rd5 23.Rad1 c5 24.a4 Rd8 25.Rxd5 Qxd5 26.axb5 axb5 27.Qe2 b4 28.cxb4 cxb4 29.Qg4 b3 30.Kh2 Qf7 31.Qg5 Rd7 32.f3 h6 33.Qe3 Rd8 34.g4 Kh8 35.Qb6 Rd2 36.Qb8+ Kh7 37.Re8 Qxf3 38.Rh8+ Kg6 39.Rxh6+ (diagram)
Bronstein:

Korchnoi remained unruffled. He wrote down my move on his scoresheet and began carefully studying the position. I think it seemed incredible to him that White could sacrifice his last rook (I myself could not believe my eyes!). And only when he had convinced himself, did he stop the clocks. These are the variations: A) 39...Kf7 40.Qc7+ Kg8 41.Qc8+ Kf7 42.Qe6+ Kf8 43.Rh8 mate; B) 39...Kg5 40.Qe5+ Kxg4 41.Rg6+ Kh4 42.Qg5 mate; C) 39...gxh6 40.Qg8+ Kf6 41.Qf8+; D) 39...Kxh6 40.Qh8+ Kg6 41.Qh5+ Kf6 42.g5+!

1–0

== Notable games ==
- Sergei Belavenets vs. Bronstein, USSR Championship semifinal, Rostov-on-Don 1941, King's Indian Defence, Fianchetto Variation (E67), 0–1 The 17-year-old Bronstein meets the Chairman of the USSR Classification Committee, who had just awarded him the title of Master.
- Ludek Pachman vs. Bronstein, tt Prague 1946, King's Indian Defence, Fianchetto Variation (E67), 0–1 A stunning original tactical onslaught which attracted worldwide acclaim.
- Bronstein vs. Isaac Boleslavsky, Candidates' Playoff Match, Moscow 1950, game 1, Grunfeld Defence (D89), 1–0 Bronstein offers a far-seeing exchange sacrifice, which ties Black up, leading to a beautiful strategical win.
- Mikhail Botvinnik vs. Bronstein, World Championship Match, Moscow 1951, Nimzo-Indian Defence, Rubinstein Variation (E47), 0–1 Although Bronstein had a slight minus record against Botvinnik, he beat Botvinnik several times with the black pieces. Here's one of his wins from their 1951 World Championship match.
- Bronstein vs. Mikhail Botvinnik, World Championship Match, Moscow 1951, game 22, Dutch Defence, Stonewall Variation (A91), 1–0 A very deep combination exploits Black's back-rank weakness, giving Bronstein a one-game lead with two to play.
- Samuel Reshevsky vs. Bronstein, Zurich Candidates' 1953, King's Indian, Fianchetto Variation (E68), 0–1 Beforehand, Bronstein was ordered by Soviet chess authorities to win this crucial game, in order to stop Reshevsky's chances of winning the tournament. He gives it everything he has, and triumphs over stout defense. This game was chosen by Grandmaster Ulf Andersson as his favourite game by another player and he analyses it in the book Learn from the Grandmasters.
- Bronstein vs. Paul Keres, Goteborg Interzonal 1955, Nimzo-Indian Defence, Rubinstein Variation (E41), 1–0 A dramatic game between two attacking geniuses.
- Itzak Aloni vs. Bronstein, Moscow Olympiad 1956, King's Indian Defence, Saemisch Variation (E85), 0–1 This virtuoso game sees Bronstein sacrifice three pawns to open queenside lines into Aloni's king position.
- Bronstein vs. M-20(Computer), Moscow Mathematics Institute 1963, King's Gambit: Accepted, Schallop Defense (C34), 1–0 The oldest-known game between a grandmaster and a computer.
- Stefan Brzozka vs. Bronstein, USSR 1963, Dutch Defence, Leningrad Variation (A88), 0–1 A surprising and deep positional breakthrough. The most interesting part of the game starts with White's 42nd move, trying to sacrifice an exchange in order to achieve a seemingly sterile blocked position.
- Lev Polugaevsky vs. Bronstein, USSR 1971, English Opening, Symmetrical Variation (A34), 0–1 Bronstein offers an original, problematic pawn sacrifice, which Polugaevsky accepts, leaving him tied up for the rest of the game; Bronstein converts his positional advantage with deep tactics.
- Bronstein vs. Ljubomir Ljubojevic, Petropolis Interzonal 1973, Alekhine's Defence, Four Pawns' Attack (B03), 1–0 A long-range rook sacrifice eventually brings home the point in scintillating style to win the First Brilliancy Prize.
- Bronstein vs. Viktor Kupreichik, USSR Championship semifinal, Minsk 1983, King's Indian Defence (E90), 1–0 Kupreichik goes toe-to-toe with Bronstein in the King's Indian, and the old master shows the young one a trick or two!
- Bronstein vs. Ivan Sokolov, Pancevo 1987, Grunfeld Defence, Russian Variation (D98), 1–0 Another young master experiences Bronstein's aging yet potent chess powers.
- Stuart Conquest vs. Bronstein, London 1989, CaroKann Defence (B10), 0–1 A dazzling tactical display leaves White helpless in only 26 moves.
- Bronstein vs. Walter Browne, Reykjavik 1990, Sicilian Defence, Najdorf Variation (B99), 1–0 In a very deep theoretical variation, Bronstein comes up with some new ideas, and even Najdorf-guru Browne, a six-time U.S. champion, can't find his way.

== See also ==
- Game clock – for the Bronstein delay
- List of Jewish chess players

Achievements
Preceded by None	Youngest chess grandmaster ever 1950–1952	Succeeded by Tigran Petrosian
