= World Chess Championship 1978 =

Chess match between Anatoly Karpov and Viktor Korchnoi

	Defending champion	Challenger
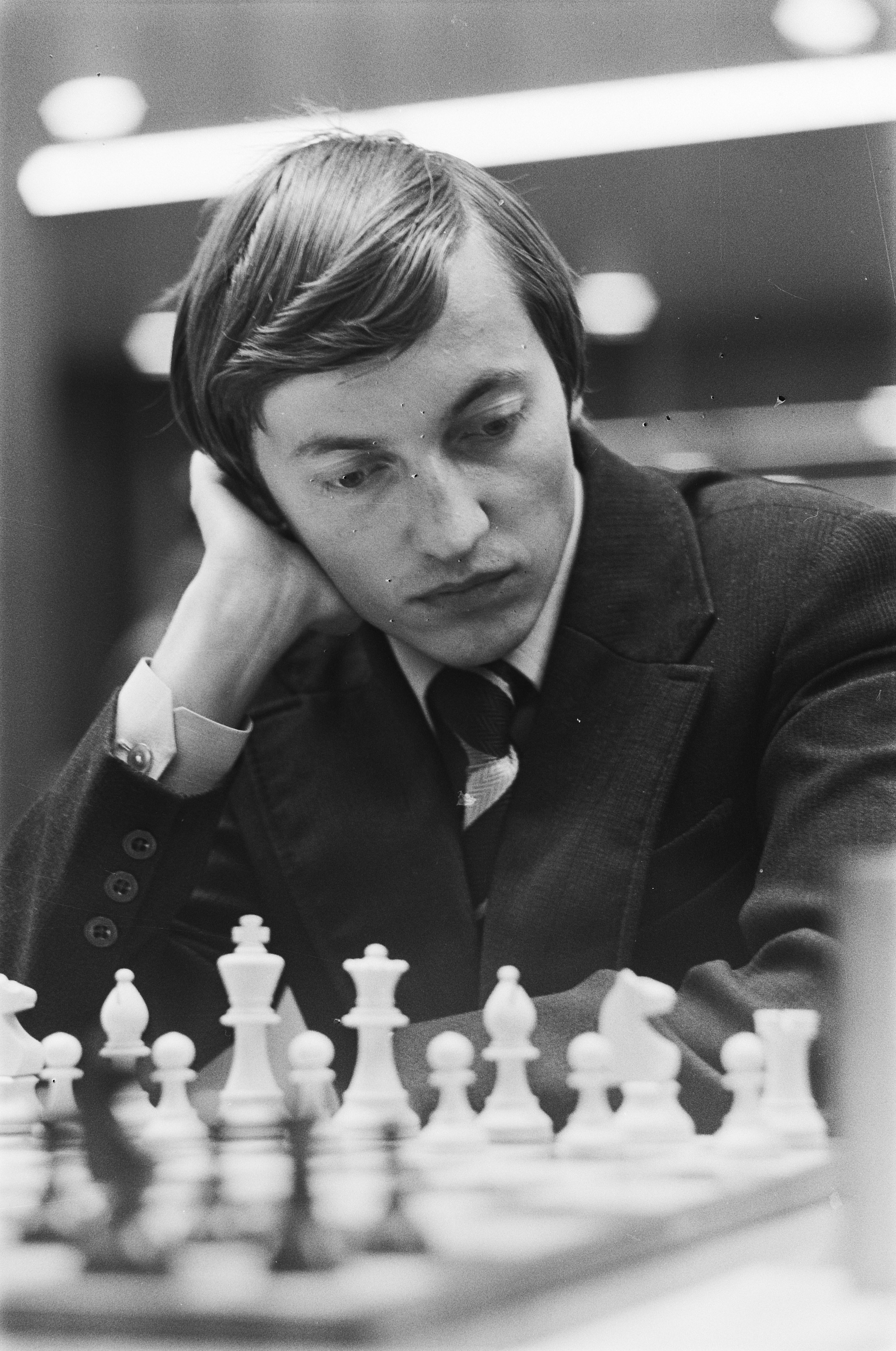
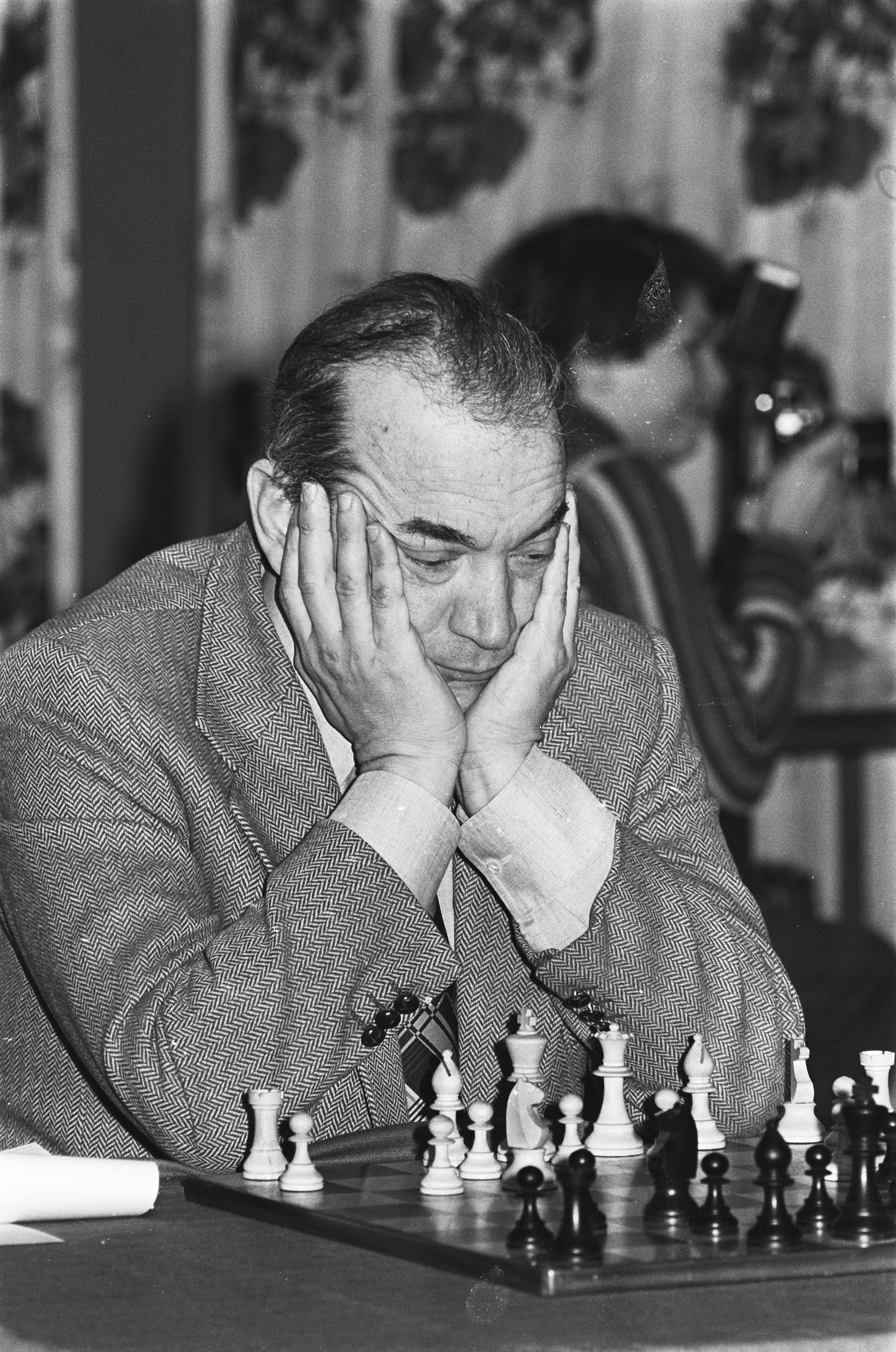
	Anatoly Karpov	Viktor Korchnoi
	(Soviet Union) Anatoly Karpov	Viktor Korchnoi
6	Scores	5
	Born 23 May 1951; 27 years old	Born 23 March 1931; 47 years old
	Winner of the 1975 World Chess Championship	Winner of the 1977 Candidates Tournament
	Rating: 2725 (World No. 1)	Rating: 2665 (World No. 2)

The 1978 World Chess Championship was played between Anatoly Karpov and Viktor Korchnoi in Baguio, Philippines, from 18 July to 18 October 1978. Karpov won, thereby retaining the title.

The match is remembered for the mutual ill will between the contestants, leading to many bizarre incidents, including a hypnotist who would stare intently at Korchnoi in order to unsettle him, Ananda Marga cultists, and a complaint that yogurt (or other refreshments delivered to the players) might convey a coded message. In quality of play, the match itself never measured up to the press headlines that it generated, although as a sporting contest it had its share of excitement. The match would go to the first player to win six games, draws not counting. After 17 games, Karpov had a 4–1 lead. Korchnoi won game 21, but Karpov won game 27, putting him on the brink of victory with a 5–2 lead. Korchnoi fought back, scoring three wins and one draw in the next four games to equalize the match at 5–5 after 31 games. Karpov won the very next game, however, and the match, by 6–5 with 21 draws.

Baguio Convention Center, the site of the 1978 World Chess Championship

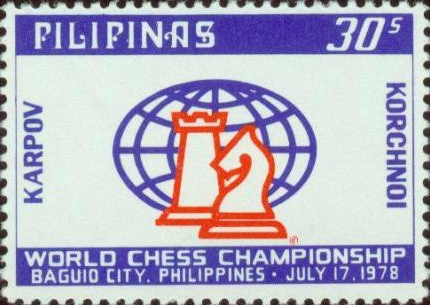
World Chess Championship 1978 on a stamp of the Philippines

== 1976 Interzonal tournaments ==
Two interzonal tournaments were held in 1976 in Manila and Biel, with the top 3 from each qualifying for the Candidates Tournament.

June–July 1976 Interzonal, Manila
		Rating	1	2	3	4	5	6	7	8	9	10	11	12	13	14	15	16	17	18	19	20	Total
1	Henrique Mecking (Brazil)	2620	–	½	½	1	½	½	½	1	½	0	½	1	½	1	1	½	½	1	1	1	13
2	Lev Polugaevsky (Soviet Union)	2635	½	–	0	½	½	½	½	½	1	½	1	½	½	1	½	1	1	½	1	1	12½
3	Vlastimil Hort (Czechoslovakia)	2600	½	1	–	0	½	0	½	0	½	½	1	½	1	½	1	1	1	1	1	1	12½
4	Vitaly Tseshkovsky (Soviet Union)	2550	0	½	1	–	½	½	0	1	½	½	½	½	0	1	1	1	1	½	1	1	12
5	Zoltán Ribli (Hungary)	2475	½	½	½	½	–	1	1	1	½	0	½	0	1	1	½	0	½	½	1	1	11½
6	Ljubomir Ljubojević (Yugoslavia)	2620	½	½	1	½	0	–	0	0	1	½	0	½	1	1	1	1	½	1	½	1	11½
7	Lubomir Kavalek (United States)	2540	½	½	½	1	0	1	–	½	½	1	½	1	0	½	0	0	½	½	1	1	10½
8	Oscar Panno (Argentina)	2520	0	½	1	0	0	1	½	–	1	1	0	½	½	0	½	½	1	1	½	1	10½
9	Yuri Balashov (Soviet Union)	2545	½	0	½	½	½	0	½	0	–	1	½	½	½	1	½	½	1	1	1	½	10½
10	Boris Spassky (Soviet Union)	2630	1	½	½	½	1	½	0	0	0	–	½	1	½	½	½	½	½	½	½	1	10
11	Florin Gheorghiu (Romania)	2540	½	0	0	½	½	1	½	1	½	½	–	1	½	½	½	½	0	½	1	½	10
12	Wolfgang Uhlmann (East Germany)	2555	0	½	½	½	1	½	0	½	½	0	0	–	1	1	½	1	1	½	0	1	10
13	Sergio Mariotti (Italy)	2470	½	½	0	1	0	0	1	½	½	½	½	0	–	1	½	½	1	1	1	0	10
14	Miguel Quinteros (Argentina)	2540	0	0	½	0	0	0	½	1	0	½	½	0	0	–	1	1	1	1	1	1	9
15	Walter Browne (United States)	2585	0	½	0	0	½	0	1	½	½	½	½	½	½	0	–	1	1	½	0	1	8½
16	Eugenio Torre (Philippines)	2505	½	0	0	0	1	0	1	½	½	½	½	0	½	0	0	–	0	1	1	0	7
17	Peter Biyiasas (Canada)	2460	½	0	0	0	½	½	½	0	0	½	1	0	0	0	0	1	–	1	½	0	6
18	Ludek Pachman (West Germany)	2520	0	½	0	½	½	0	½	0	0	½	½	½	0	0	½	0	0	–	½	½	5
19	Tan Lian Ann (Singapore)	2365	0	0	0	0	0	½	0	½	0	½	0	1	0	0	1	0	½	½	–	½	5
20	Khosro Harandi (Iran)	2380	0	0	0	0	0	0	0	0	½	0	½	0	1	0	0	1	1	½	½	–	5

Mecking, Polugaevsky, and Hort qualified for the Candidates Tournament.

July–August 1976 Interzonal, Biel
		Rating	1	2	3	4	5	6	7	8	9	10	11	12	13	14	15	16	17	18	19	20	Total
1	Bent Larsen (Denmark)	2625	–	0	1	½	½	0	½	½	½	½	1	½	1	½	½	1	1	1	1	1	12½
2	Tigran Petrosian (Soviet Union)	2635	1	–	½	½	½	½	1	½	½	½	½	1	½	½	½	1	½	0	1	1	12
3	Lajos Portisch (Hungary)	2625	0	½	–	0	½	½	½	1	1	1	1	1	½	1	1	0	½	1	0	1	12
4	Mikhail Tal (Soviet Union)	2615	½	½	1	–	0	1	1	½	½	½	½	½	½	½	½	½	½	1	1	1	12
5	Vasily Smyslov (Soviet Union)	2580	½	½	½	1	–	0	½	1	½	½	½	½	½	1	½	½	1	1	½	½	11½
6	Robert Byrne (United States)	2540	1	½	½	0	1	–	½	½	0	½	½	½	1	½	½	½	1	1	½	1	11½
7	Robert Hübner (West Germany)	2585	½	0	½	0	½	½	–	½	1	½	½	½	1	1	½	½	1	½	1	1	11½
8	Ulf Andersson (Sweden)	2585	½	½	0	½	0	½	½	–	0	½	0	½	½	½	1	1	1	1	1	1	10½
9	István Csom (Hungary)	2490	½	½	0	½	½	1	0	1	–	½	0	0	0	1	1	1	0	1	1	½	10
10	Efim Geller (Soviet Union)	2620	½	½	0	½	½	½	½	½	½	–	½	1	½	½	0	½	1	0	1	1	10
11	Jan Smejkal (Czechoslovakia)	2615	0	½	0	½	½	½	½	1	1	½	–	0	½	1	1	½	½	1	½	1	10
12	Gennadi Sosonko (Netherlands)	2505	½	0	0	½	½	½	½	½	1	0	1	–	½	½	½	½	½	½	½	1	9½
13	Vladimir Liberzon (Israel)	2540	0	½	½	½	½	0	0	½	1	½	½	½	–	0	½	1	½	½	1	½	9
14	Kenneth Rogoff (United States)	2480	½	½	0	½	0	½	0	½	0	½	1	½	1	–	½	0	½	1	1	½	9
15	Boris Gulko (Soviet Union)	2530	½	½	0	½	½	½	½	0	0	1	0	½	½	½	–	½	0	1	1	1	9
16	Raúl Sanguineti (Argentina)	2480	0	0	1	½	½	½	½	0	0	½	½	½	0	1	½	–	½	½	½	1	8½
17	Aleksandar Matanović (Yugoslavia)	2525	0	½	½	½	0	0	0	0	1	0	½	½	½	½	1	½	–	½	½	1	8
18	Oscar Castro (Colombia)	2380	0	1	0	0	0	0	½	0	0	1	0	½	½	0	0	½	½	–	1	½	6
19	André Lombard (Switzerland)	2420	0	0	1	0	½	½	0	0	0	0	½	½	0	0	0	½	½	0	–	1	5
20	Joaquin Carlos Diaz (Cuba)	2385	0	0	0	0	½	0	0	0	½	0	0	0	½	½	0	0	0	½	0	–	2½

Larsen qualified outright for the Candidates Tournament. Petrosian, Portisch, and Tal contested a playoff in Varese later in the year for the remaining two spots, from which Petrosian and Portisch qualified.

1976 playoff, Varese
		Rating	1	2	3	Total
1	Tigran Petrosian (Soviet Union)	2635	-	1===	====	4½
2	Lajos Portisch (Hungary)	2625	0===	-	=1==	4
3	Mikhail Tal (Soviet Union)	2615	====	=0==	-	3½

== 1977 Candidates tournament ==
As loser of the last championship (by forfeiture) and runner-up of the previous Candidates tournament, respectively, Bobby Fischer and Korchnoi were seeded directly into the tournament. When Fischer declined, Spassky, as losing semifinalist of the previous tournament, was offered the spot. The two seeded players were joined by the top three from each of the two interzonals. Viktor Korchnoi, formerly a representative of the USSR, was stateless at the time.

Quarterfinals
Il Ciocco, Feb–Mar 1977
Viktor Korchnoi	6½
(Soviet Union) Tigran Petrosian	5½
Lucerne, Feb–Mar 1977
(Soviet Union) Lev Polugaevsky	6½
(Brazil) Henrique Mecking	5½
Reykjavik, Feb–Mar 1977
(Soviet Union) Boris Spassky	8½
(Czechoslovakia) Vlastimil Hort	7½
Rotterdam, Feb–Mar 1977
(Denmark) Bent Larsen	3½
(Hungary) Lajos Portisch	6½

Semifinals
Evian, July 1977
Viktor Korchnoi	8½
(Soviet Union) Lev Polugaevsky	4½
Geneva, July–Aug 1977
(Soviet Union) Boris Spassky	8½
(Hungary) Lajos Portisch	6½

Final
Belgrade, Nov–Dec 1977
Viktor Korchnoi	10½
(Soviet Union) Boris Spassky	7½

Korchnoi narrowly defeated Petrosian again in the Candidates quarterfinals, then comfortably won his matches against Polugaevsky and Spassky to emerge as the official challenger to Karpov.

== 1978 Championship match ==
=== Incidents ===
Karpov's team included noted Soviet psychologist and hypnotherapist Vladimir Petrovich Zukhar, while Korchnoi enlisted the help of two American Ananda Marga sect members, Stephen Dwyer and Victoria Sheppard, who had recently been convicted of the attempted murder of an Indian diplomat and released on bail. There was more controversy off the board, with histrionics ranging from X-raying of chairs, protests about the flags used on the board, and Korchnoi's complaints that Zukhar, sitting in the front row, attempted to hypnotize him. When Karpov's team sent him a blueberry yogurt during a game without any request for one by Karpov, the Korchnoi team protested, claiming it could be some kind of code. They later said this was intended as a parody of earlier protests, but it was taken seriously at the time. It has also been alleged, based on the Mitrokhin Archive, that prior to the match the KGB assembled a team of eighteen foreign intelligence operations officers to try to ensure Korchnoi's defeat. Korchnoi's second Michael Stean later described it as "the dirtiest chess match in history".

=== Results ===
The first player to win six games would be champion.

World Chess Championship Match 1978
	1	2	3	4	5	6	7	8	9	10	11	12	13	14	15	16	17	18	19	20	21	22	23	24	25	26	27	28	29	30	31	32	Wins	Total
Anatoly Karpov (Soviet Union)	=	=	=	=	=	=	=	1	=	=	0	=	1	1	=	=	1	=	=	=	0	=	=	=	=	=	1	0	0	=	0	1	6	16½
Viktor Korchnoi	=	=	=	=	=	=	=	0	=	=	1	=	0	0	=	=	0	=	=	=	1	=	=	=	=	=	0	1	1	=	1	0	5	15½

Karpov won, retaining his title.

== Games ==
=== Game 1: Korchnoi–Karpov, ½–½ ===
18 July. The match began with the Queen's Gambit Declined which became a quiet draw in 18 moves.
Match score: tied 0–0 with 1 draw.

G1, position after 8...Bb7

Position: a8 black rook, b8 black knight, d8 black queen, f8 black rook, g8 black king, a7 black pawn, b7 black bishop, c7 black pawn, e7 black bishop, f7 black pawn, g7 black pawn, b6 black pawn, e6 black pawn, f6 black knight, h6 black pawn, d5 black pawn, c4 white pawn, d4 white pawn, h4 white bishop, c3 white knight, e3 white pawn, f3 white knight, a2 white pawn, b2 white pawn, f2 white pawn, g2 white pawn, h2 white pawn, c1 white rook, d1 white queen, e1 white king, f1 white bishop, h1 white rook

Korchnoi played 9.Bd3. He had defeated Spassky in 1977 with 9.Bxf6.
G1, final position after 18...Rfc8

Position: a8 black rook, c8 black rook, g8 black king, b7 black bishop, e7 black queen, f7 black pawn, g7 black pawn, a6 black pawn, b6 black pawn, e6 black pawn, h6 black pawn, c4 white bishop, d4 white knight, e4 black knight, a3 white pawn, e3 white pawn, h3 white pawn, b2 white pawn, e2 white queen, f2 white pawn, g2 white pawn, c1 white rook, d1 white rook, g1 white king

Drawn on Karpov's proposal

Karpov often played the Queen's Indian Defense (3...b6), but in this game chose the Tartakower Defense (called the Makogonov–Bondarevsky in Russian), with 3...d5 and later 7...b6. The Tartakover had featured in two important victories by White in recent world championship play, the game 6 win by Fischer against Spassky in the 1972 World Championship match, and a win by Korchnoi also against Spassky in the 1977 Candidates tournament final match in Belgrade that made Korchnoi the challenger.

In game 7 of the Candidates final match against Spassky (first diagram), Korchnoi played 9.Bxf6 Bxf6 10.cxd5 exd5 11.b4!? and went on to win. Karpov would have prepared for this so Korchnoi tried 9.Bd3 instead, but obtained no advantage and the game was drawn on Karpov's proposal after move 18 (second diagram).

Queen's Gambit Declined, Tartakower (Makogonov–Bondarevsky) System
1.c4 Nf6 2.Nc3 e6 3.Nf3 d5 4.d4 Be7 5.Bg5 h6 6.Bh4 0-0 7.e3 b6 8.Rc1 Bb7 9.Bd3 dxc4 10.Bxc4 Nbd7 11.0-0 c5 12.dxc5 Nxc5 13.Qe2 a6 14.Rfd1 Qe8 15.a3 Nfe4 16.Nxe4 Nxe4 17.Bxe7 Qxe7 18.Nd4 Rfc8 ½–½

=== Game 2: Karpov–Korchnoi, ½–½ ===
20 July. Karpov obtained the small advantage of a bishop versus a knight, but the endgame was drawn in 29 moves.
Match score: tied 0–0 with 2 draws.

G2, position after 14.Re1

Position: a8 black rook, d8 black queen, f8 black rook, g8 black king, c7 black pawn, f7 black pawn, g7 black pawn, h7 black pawn, a6 black pawn, c6 black knight, b5 black pawn, c5 black knight, d5 black pawn, e5 white pawn, g4 black bishop, c3 white pawn, f3 white knight, a2 white pawn, b2 white pawn, c2 white bishop, d2 white knight, f2 white pawn, g2 white pawn, h2 white pawn, a1 white rook, c1 white bishop, d1 white queen, e1 white rook, g1 white king

Karpov had had this position as White in several games that continued 14...Re8. Korchnoi introduced the new move 14...d4!?
G2, final position after 29.f4

Position: c8 black rook, f7 black king, g7 black pawn, a6 black pawn, f6 black pawn, b5 black pawn, e5 black knight, h5 black pawn, f4 white pawn, b3 white pawn, e3 white bishop, h3 white pawn, a2 white pawn, d2 white rook, g2 white pawn, g1 white king

Draw agreed with Black to move

The Open Defense of the Ruy Lopez was a small surprise. Most observers expected Korchnoi to play the French Defense which he had employed successfully against Spassky in the 1977 Candidates finals match and also against Karpov in 1974, but Korchnoi had many defenses to 1.e4 in his repertoire including the French, the Sicilian, the Alekhine, the Pirc, and the Ruy Lopez.

Karpov was very familiar with the position after 14.Re1 (first diagram) as he had had it as White in draws against Vasily Smyslov at Leningrad 1977 and Tilburg 1977, and in a loss on time to Alexander Beliavsky at Leningrad 1977, although Karpov thought he had obtained the opening advantage. In those games Black played the standard move 14...Re8, which was also chosen by Bent Larsen in a win over Bobby Fischer at Santa Monica 1966.

Korchnoi introduced the new move, 14...d4!?. A few moves later after 18...Qd5!, Karpov decided to simplify to an equal endgame and his small advantage of a bishop versus a knight proved insufficient to win.

Ruy Lopez, Open Defense
1.e4 e5 2.Nf3 Nc6 3.Bb5 a6 4.Ba4 Nf6 5.0-0 Nxe4 6.d4 b5 7.Bb3 d5 8.dxe5 Be6 9.c3 Bc5 10.Nbd2 0-0 11.Bc2 Bf5 12.Nb3 Bg4 13.Nxc5 Nxc5 14.Re1 d4 15.h3 Bh5 16.cxd4 Bxf3 17.Qxf3 Nxd4 18.Qc3 Qd5 19.Be3 Nxc2 20.Qxc2 Nd3 21.Red1 Rfd8 22.Qxc7 Qxe5 23.Qxe5 Nxe5 24.b3 f6 25.Bb6 Rxd1+ 26.Rxd1 Rc8 27.Rd2 h5 28.Be3 Kf7 29.f4 ½–½

=== Game 3: Korchnoi–Karpov, ½–½ ===
22 July. Korchnoi obtained an advantage and expert observers expected he would win with a kingside attack, but the game was even by move 25 and a draw was agreed on move 30.
Match score: tied 0–0 with 3 draws.

G3, position after 21...Qc7

Position: a8 black rook, e8 black rook, g8 black king, a7 black pawn, c7 black queen, e7 black knight, f7 black pawn, h7 black pawn, c6 black bishop, e6 black pawn, g6 black pawn, d5 black pawn, a4 black pawn, d4 white pawn, f4 white pawn, g4 white pawn, a3 white pawn, c3 white knight, e3 white rook, b2 white pawn, c2 white bishop, d2 white queen, h2 white pawn, e1 white rook, h1 white king

White (Korchnoi) has a kingside attack.
G3, final position after 30...Qe6

Position: a8 black rook, h8 black king, f7 black pawn, h7 black pawn, c6 black bishop, e6 black queen, d5 black pawn, f5 black pawn, a4 black pawn, d4 white pawn, h4 white queen, a3 white pawn, c3 white knight, b2 white pawn, h2 white pawn, g1 white rook, h1 white king

Draw agreed. Korchnoi is a pawn down and will repeat the position with 31.Qg5.

This is the first time Korchnoi allowed Karpov to play the Nimzo-Indian Defense in all their games together. Karpov's 9...a5 might have been introduced in this game (the usual move was 9...b6), but Korchnoi had analyzed it with Semyon Furman in 1967 and obtained an advantage for White. At one point in the game Korchnoi had a half hour more on the clock than his opponent, a rare occurrence in his games with Karpov. Korchnoi developed a kingside attack around move 20 that many grandmasters observing the match thought could be decisive, including Miguel Najdorf, Robert Byrne, Mikhail Tal, and Max Euwe. On move 24, the experts variously suggested 24.Re5 or 24.Rg3 with "a promising position" or "good chances", but Larsen concluded that White does not have a mating attack because his knight is too far away. Soon Korchnoi was down by a pawn so he forced a draw by repetition on move 30 (second diagram).

Nimzo-Indian Defense, Rubinstein Variation
1.c4 Nf6 2.d4 e6 3.Nc3 Bb4 4.e3 c5 5.Ne2 cxd4 6.exd4 d5 7.c5 Ne4 8.Bd2 Nxd2 9.Qxd2 a5 10.a3 Bxc3 11.Nxc3 Bd7 12.Bd3 a4 13.0-0 0-0 14.f4 g6 15.Kh1 Nc6 16.Bc2 Ne7 17.Rae1 b6 18.Rf3 Re8 19.Rfe3 Bc6 20.cxb6 Qxb6 21.g4 Qc7 22.f5 exf5 23.gxf5 Qd6 24.Rh3 Nxf5 25.Bxf5 gxf5 26.Rg1+ Kh8 27.Rh6 Re6 28.Rxe6 Qxe6 29.Qg5 Qg6 30.Qh4 Qe6 ½–½

=== Game 4: Karpov–Korchnoi, ½–½ ===
25 July. Karpov again could not gain an advantage as White against Korchnoi's Open Ruy Lopez, resulting in the fourth straight draw.
Match score: tied 0–0 with 4 draws.

G4, position after 14...Bh5

Position: a8 black rook, d8 black queen, f8 black rook, g8 black king, c7 black pawn, f7 black pawn, g7 black pawn, h7 black pawn, a6 black pawn, c6 black knight, b5 black pawn, c5 black knight, d5 black pawn, e5 white pawn, h5 black bishop, c3 white pawn, f3 white knight, a2 white pawn, b2 white pawn, c2 white bishop, d2 white knight, f2 white pawn, g2 white pawn, h2 white pawn, a1 white rook, c1 white bishop, d1 white queen, e1 white rook, g1 white king

Korchnoi deviates from 14...d4 in game 2 to play a known "bad" move.
G4, final position after 19.Bd2

Position: a8 black rook, d8 black queen, e8 black rook, g8 black king, c7 black pawn, f7 black pawn, g7 black pawn, h7 black pawn, a6 black pawn, c6 black knight, e6 black knight, b5 black pawn, d5 black pawn, e5 white pawn, h5 black bishop, c3 white pawn, f3 white knight, h3 white pawn, a2 white pawn, b2 white pawn, c2 white bishop, d2 white bishop, f2 white pawn, g2 white pawn, a1 white rook, d1 white queen, e1 white rook, g1 white king

Draw agreed with Black to move

Korchnoi did not repeat his innovation from game 2, 14...d4!?, and instead chose the known "bad" move 14...Bh5. This move was thought to be a blunder for Black since the game David Bronstein–Salo Flohr, 1944 USSR Championship, which continued 15.Bg5 Bxf3 16.Qxf3 Qxg5 17.Qxd5 Nd7 with advantage to White. In fact, in 1974 Korchnoi had written that this move was a mistake in Encyclopedia of Chess Openings, Volume C, which points out that White gains a large advantage after 15.Bg5 Qd7 16.Be3 Ne6 17.Bxh7+!. Later Korchnoi found that Black can equalize in the Bronstein–Flohr line with 17...Rae8! instead of 17...Nd7. Karpov was able to work out Korchnoi's idea at the board.

On move 15 Karpov thought for 40 minutes before playing 15.h3, an odd-looking move since the black bishop had already moved from g4. Korchnoi obtained an easy draw as Black. Because of a lack of success proving an advantage as White in this line, Karpov later abandoned the move 13.Nxc5 and instead played 13.h3.

Ruy Lopez, Open Defense
1.e4 e5 2.Nf3 Nc6 3.Bb5 a6 4.Ba4 Nf6 5.0-0 Nxe4 6.d4 b5 7.Bb3 d5 8.dxe5 Be6 9.c3 Bc5 10.Nbd2 0-0 11.Bc2 Bf5 12.Nb3 Bg4 13.Nxc5 Nxc5 14.Re1 Bh5 15.h3 Re8 16.Bf4 Ne6 17.Bd2 Nc5 18.Bf4 Ne6 19.Bd2 ½–½

=== Game 5: Korchnoi–Karpov, ½–½ ===
27, 28, and 30 July. This Nimzo-Indian Defense led to a grueling bishop endgame spanning 124 moves and two adjournments, finally ending in the stalemating of Black.
Match score: 0–0 with 5 draws.

G5, position after 54...Kd5

Position: a7 black pawn, e7 black knight, g7 black pawn, b6 black pawn, f6 black knight, g6 white bishop, h6 black pawn, d5 black king, e5 white bishop, h5 white pawn, b4 white pawn, d4 white pawn, h4 white king, a3 white pawn, f3 white pawn, h3 white queen, d2 black queen

Korchnoi played 55.Be4+?? overlooking a forced mate starting with 55.Bf7+.
G5, position after 99.Bf4

Position: b5 black pawn, f5 white king, a4 black pawn, f4 white bishop, a3 white pawn, f3 black king

Karpov as Black draws with 99...Kg2!

It was the first world championship finals game to end in stalemate and became the longest game in the championship finals, surpassing the 121-move draw in game 20 of the Tal–Botvinnik, 1961 World Championship. (This record was broken in Carlsen versus Nepomniachtchi, World Chess Championship 2021, Game 6, a 136-move win for White.) Korchnoi later explained that since he could not beat Karpov, he would simply stalemate him, adding that it gave him great pleasure to do this to the world champion. Karpov thought that playing to stalemate in an obviously drawn position violated the unwritten rules of chess and reflected badly on Korchnoi. (See Stalemate § Korchnoi versus Karpov.)

Karpov said that his home analysis was flawed and that he made "inexcusable mistakes", losing a pawn.

Karpov's 51...Kg8?!, 52...Kf7?, 53...Ke6?? ("an insane king march" — Keene) should have cost him the game (51...Qa2, 52...Kf8, and 53...Kf8 were better), but Korchnoi was short on time and missed a forced checkmate. On move 55, just two moves before the second time control (first diagram), Korchnoi played 55.Be4+??, overlooking a checkmate-in-7 beginning with 55.Bf7+ Kc6 56.Qe6+.

In 1954, Yuri Averbakh established that Black can draw the position after 99.Bf4 with either side to move (second diagram). Black must get his king to the queenside, but the tempting 99...Ke2 and 99...Kf2 lose. Karpov played the only move to draw, 99...Kg2! (100.Ke4 Kh3 101.Kd5 Kg4 and Black gets to the queenside in time to draw).

Nimzo-Indian Defense, Rubinstein Variation
1.c4 Nf6 2.d4 e6 3.Nc3 Bb4 4.e3 c5 5.Ne2 d5 6.a3 Bxc3+ 7.Nxc3 cxd4 8.exd4 dxc4 9.Bxc4 Nc6 10.Be3 0-0 11.0-0 b6 12.Qd3 Bb7 13.Rad1 h6 14.f3 Ne7 15.Bf2 Nfd5 16.Ba2 Nf4 17.Qd2 Nfg6 18.Bb1 Qd7 19.h4 Rfd8 20.h5 Nf8 21.Bh4 f6 22.Ne4 Nd5 23.g4 Rac8 24.Bg3 Ba6 25.Rfe1 Rc6 26.Rc1 Ne7 27.Rxc6 Qxc6 28.Ba2 Qd7 29.Nd6 Bb7 30.Nxb7 Qxb7 31.Qe3 Kh8 32.Rc1 Nd5 33.Qe4 Qd7 34.Bb1 Qb5 35.b4 Qd7 36.Qd3 Qe7 37.Kf2 f5 38.gxf5 exf5 39.Re1 Qf6 40.Be5 Qh4+ 41.Bg3 Qf6 42.Rh1 Nh7 43.Be5 Qg5 44.Qxf5 Qd2+ 45.Kg3 Nhf6 46.Rg1 Re8 47.Be4 Ne7 48.Qh3 Rc8 49.Kh4 Rc1 50.Qg3 Rxg1 51.Qxg1 Kg8 52.Qg3 Kf7 53.Bg6+ Ke6 54.Qh3+ Kd5 55.Be4+ Nxe4 56.fxe4+ Kxe4 57.Qg4+ Kd3 58.Qf3+ Qe3 59.Kg4 Qxf3+ 60.Kxf3 g6 61.Bd6 Nf5 62.Kf4 Nh4 63.Kg4 gxh5+ 64.Kxh4 Kxd4 65.Bb8 a5 66.Bd6 Kc4 67.Kxh5 a4 68.Kxh6 Kb3 69.b5 Kc4 70.Kg5 Kxb5 71.Kf5 Ka6 72.Ke6 Ka7 73.Kd7 Kb7 74.Be7 Ka7 75.Kc7 Ka8 76.Bd6 Ka7 77.Kc8 Ka6 78.Kb8 b5 79.Bb4 Kb6 80.Kc8 Kc6 81.Kd8 Kd5 82.Ke7 Ke5 83.Kf7 Kd5 84.Kf6 Kd4 85.Ke6 Ke4 86.Bf8 Kd4 87.Kd6 Ke4 88.Bg7 Kf4 89.Ke6 Kf3 90.Ke5 Kg4 91.Bf6 Kh5 92.Kf5 Kh6 93.Bd4 Kh7 94.Kf6 Kh6 95.Be3+ Kh5 96.Kf5 Kh4 97.Bd2 Kg3 98.Bg5 Kf3 99.Bf4 Kg2 100.Bd6 Kf3 101.Bh2 Kg2 102.Bc7 Kf3 103.Bd6 Ke3 104.Ke5 Kf3 105.Kd5 Kg4 106.Kc5 Kf5 107.Kxb5 Ke6 108.Kc6 Kf6 109.Kd7 Kg7 110.Be7 Kg8 111.Ke6 Kg7 112.Bc5 Kg8 113.Kf6 Kh7 114.Kf7 Kh8 115.Bd4+ Kh7 116.Bb2 Kh6 117.Kg8 Kg6 118.Bg7 Kf5 119.Kf7 Kg5 120.Bb2 Kh6 121.Bc1+ Kh7 122.Bd2 Kh8 123.Bc3+ Kh7 124.Bg7 ½–½

=== Game 6: Karpov–Korchnoi, ½–½ ===
29 July. A deadlocked draw in under 30 moves.
Match score: tied 0–0 with 6 draws.

G6, final position after 23.Qe3

Position: a8 black rook, e8 black queen, g8 black king, c7 black pawn, e7 black rook, g7 black pawn, b6 black pawn, d6 black pawn, f6 black pawn, h6 black pawn, a5 black pawn, c5 black knight, d5 white pawn, f5 black bishop, a4 white pawn, c4 white pawn, d4 white bishop, e4 black pawn, b3 white pawn, e3 white queen, g3 white pawn, h3 white pawn, e2 white pawn, f2 white pawn, g2 white bishop, h2 white king, c1 white rook, f1 white rook

Korchnoi (Black) agreed to a draw although he has a small advantage.

Game 6 was played between the second and third sessions (28 July and 30 July) of the marathon game 5. Both players may have been satisfied with a short draw because Karpov didn't try very hard for an advantage as White and Korchnoi agreed to a draw as Black with a slightly better position. In the final position after 23.Qe3 (see diagram), Keene thought Korchnoi should have refused the draw and continued to play, but Larsen wrote that for Black to play for the win with such a small advantage would have been very risky..

English Opening, Four Knights, Kingside Fianchetto
1.c4 e5 2.Nc3 Nf6 3.Nf3 Nc6 4.g3 Bb4 5.Bg2 0-0 6.0-0 e4 7.Ne1 Bxc3 8.dxc3 h6 9.Nc2 Re8 10.Ne3 d6 11.Qc2 a5 12.a4 Qe7 13.Nd5 Nxd5 14.cxd5 Nb8 15.Be3 Bf5 16.h3 Nd7 17.c4 b6 18.Qc3 Nc5 19.b3 Qd7 20.Kh2 Re7 21.Bd4 f6 22.Rac1 Qe8 23.Qe3 ½–½

=== Game 7: Korchnoi–Karpov, ½–½ ===
1 and 2 August. A surprising draw. It was widely debated as to whether Karpov could have forced a win.
Match score: tied 0–0 with 7 draws.

G7, position after 6.d5

Position: a8 black rook, b8 black knight, c8 black bishop, d8 black queen, f8 black rook, g8 black king, a7 black pawn, b7 black pawn, d7 black pawn, f7 black pawn, g7 black pawn, h7 black pawn, e6 black pawn, f6 black knight, c5 black pawn, d5 white pawn, b4 black bishop, c4 white pawn, c3 white knight, d3 white bishop, e3 white pawn, a2 white pawn, b2 white pawn, f2 white pawn, g2 white pawn, h2 white pawn, a1 white rook, c1 white bishop, d1 white queen, e1 white king, g1 white knight, h1 white rook

Karpov responded to the new move with the gambit 6...b5.
G7, position after 41...Kf8

Position: d8 black rook, f8 black king, h7 white queen, b6 black bishop, c6 black queen, g6 black pawn, b5 black pawn, b4 white pawn, e4 black knight, a3 white pawn, c3 black pawn, d3 black pawn, h3 white pawn, f2 white pawn, g2 white pawn, d1 white rook, e1 white rook, h1 white king

Chess journalists thought Karpov (Black) was winning, but a draw was agreed after Korchnoi's sealed move 42.Qh8+ was revealed.

In the Nimzo-Indian games 3 and 5, Korchnoi gained the advantage as White after 4...c5 5.Ne2 so Karpov instead tried another standard move, 4...0-0. Korchnoi played the new move, 6.d5, found by his second, Jacob Murey (first diagram). White aims for either a Benoni-like position after 6...exd5 7.cxd5 d6 or to induce Black to play 6...b5 as Korchnoi's team did not think Karpov was comfortable with this kind of gambit. Karpov thought for twenty minutes before playing 6...b5.

Korchnoi won a pawn on move 8 and he was up by the exchange by move 19. Karpov's strong and advanced center pawns offered insufficient compensation, and Korchnoi held the advantage until letting it slip away around move 36. Karpov had a winning advantage until he too gave it away on move 39.

Chess journalists gave Karpov good chances to win in the adjourned position after 41...Kf8 (second diagram). The next day, the sealed move 42.Qh8+ was played on the board. Karpov immediately offered a draw without making a move and Korchnoi accepted. Grandmasters Robert Byrne, Miguel Najdorf, and Bent Larsen were surprised, but after Keene showed them the Korchnoi team's adjournment analysis, Byrne and former world champion Mikhail Tal were convinced that the position was a draw in all variations.

This seventh consecutive draw set a new record number of draws to start a world championship match, surpassing the six draws at the start of Boris Spassky–Tigran Petrosian 1966 World Championship.

Nimzo-Indian Defense
1.d4 Nf6 2.c4 e6 3.Nc3 Bb4 4.e3 0-0 5.Bd3 c5 6.d5 b5 7.dxe6 fxe6 8.cxb5 Bb7 9.Nf3 d5 10.0-0 Nbd7 11.Ne2 Qe8 12.Ng3 e5 13.Bf5 g6 14.Bh3 a6 15.Ng5 axb5 16.Ne6 c4 17.Bd2 Bc5 18.Nc7 Qe7 19.Nxa8 Rxa8 20.a3 Nb6 21.Qc2 Bc8 22.Bxc8 Rxc8 23.Ba5 Nbd7 24.Qd2 Bd6 25.Bb4 Nc5 26.Bxc5 Bxc5 27.Kh1 Qd6 28.Rad1 Kh8 29.Qc2 Qe6 30.Ne2 Qc6 31.h3 Re8 32.b4 Bb6 33.Qb2 Kg8 34.Rfe1 Kf7 35.Qc2 d4 36.Ng3 Rd8 37.exd4 exd4 38.Qd2 d3 39.Qh6 c3 40.Ne4 Nxe4 41.Qxh7+ Kf8 42.Qh8+ ½–½

=== Game 8: Karpov–Korchnoi, 1–0 ===
3 August. After seven straight draws, Karpov traps Korchnoi in a mating net to win game 8.
Match score: Karpov leads 1–0 with 7 draws.

G8, position after 10...g6?!

Position: a8 black rook, d8 black queen, e8 black king, f8 black bishop, h8 black rook, c7 black pawn, f7 black pawn, h7 black pawn, a6 black pawn, c6 black knight, e6 black bishop, g6 black pawn, b5 black pawn, c5 black knight, d5 black pawn, e5 white pawn, b3 white bishop, c3 white pawn, f3 white knight, a2 white pawn, b2 white pawn, d2 white knight, f2 white pawn, g2 white pawn, h2 white pawn, a1 white rook, c1 white bishop, d1 white queen, f1 white rook, g1 white king

Korchnoi's innovation 10...g6?! was unsuccessful. Instead 10...d4 is usual.
G8, position after 27.Rd7!

Position: e8 black rook, f8 black king, c7 black pawn, d7 white rook, f7 black pawn, g7 black rook, h7 black pawn, a6 black pawn, b6 black queen, e6 black bishop, h6 white knight, b5 black pawn, c3 white pawn, f3 white queen, a2 white pawn, b2 white pawn, g2 white pawn, h2 white pawn, f1 white rook, h1 white king

Karpov wrapped up the game nicely with 27.Rd7! threatening 28.Rxf7+.

Keene says 10...g6?! (first diagram) was thought up by Korchnoi at the board and was not part of his team's preparation. The idea behind 10...g6 is to put pressure on White's king pawn but it allowed White a powerful gambit. Karpov said he had not foreseen 10...g6, but that White's position was better. He thought for 15 minutes before deciding to gambit a pawn. Korchnoi won that pawn with 12...Nxe5, but this allowed Karpov to demolish Black's kingside and deprive him of the right to castle.

After 24.Qf3, Keene comments that the position looks like a Muzio King's Gambit where White has not had to sacrifice a piece. White's attack is overwhelming, and Karpov wrapped up the game nicely with 26.Rd7! (second diagram) threatening mate starting with 27.Rxf7+. A pretty mate results after 26...Bxd7 27.Qxf7+ Rxf7 28.Rxf7#. Korchnoi tried 26...Rb8, but Karpov forced him to resign two moves later with 28.Nd8+!

Ruy Lopez, Open Defense
1.e4 e5 2.Nf3 Nc6 3.Bb5 a6 4.Ba4 Nf6 5.0-0 Nxe4 6.d4 b5 7.Bb3 d5 8.dxe5 Be6 9.Nbd2 Nc5 10.c3 g6 11.Qe2 Bg7 12.Nd4 Nxe5 13.f4 Nc4 14.f5 gxf5 15.Nxf5 Rg8 16.Nxc4 dxc4 17.Bc2 Nd3 18.Bh6 Bf8 19.Rad1 Qd5 20.Bxd3 cxd3 21.Rxd3 Qc6 22.Bxf8 Qb6+ 23.Kh1 Kxf8 24.Qf3 Re8 25.Nh6 Rg7 26.Rd7 Rb8 27.Nxf7 Bxd7 28.Nd8+ 1–0

=== Game 9: Korchnoi–Karpov, ½–½ ===
5 August. Drawn after Korchnoi ran into time trouble.
Match score: Karpov leads 1–0 with 8 draws.

G9, position after 14.Be2

Position: a8 black rook, c8 black bishop, d8 black queen, f8 black rook, g8 black king, a7 black pawn, b7 black pawn, e7 black bishop, f7 black pawn, g7 black pawn, h7 black pawn, c6 black knight, f6 black knight, e5 black pawn, g5 white bishop, c4 white pawn, d4 black pawn, a3 white pawn, b3 white knight, c3 white knight, e3 white pawn, b2 white pawn, c2 white queen, e2 white bishop, f2 white pawn, g2 white pawn, h2 white pawn, d1 white rook, e1 white king, h1 white rook

Previous games in this position continued 14...Ng4, but Karpov played 14...h6.
G9, final position after 41...Rc3

Position: e7 black knight, f7 black pawn, g7 black king, g6 black pawn, c4 white pawn, e4 white bishop, f4 white pawn, h4 white pawn, c3 black rook, e3 black pawn, b2 white rook, g2 white pawn, h2 white king

Karpov sealed 41...Rc3 and Korchnoi agreed to a draw.

The game started as an English Opening but quickly transposed to the Queen's Gambit, as in game 1. White varied with 5.Bf4 instead of 5.Bg5. The game continued on established lines until Karpov played 14...h6, which may have been new. Petrosian–Filip, Curaçao 1962, and Portisch–Spassky, Havana 1966, continued 14...Ng4 15.Bxe7 Qxe7 16.exd4 Qh4.

On move 38, Korchnoi won a pawn but was short of time. Karpov sealed the move 41...Rc3 and offered a draw. Korchnoi accepted the draw offer before resumption of the game, but said that it was not polite for Karpov to offer a draw when down a pawn. Larsen did not think this breached any chess etiquette and Keene thought Korchnoi's remark was in jest.

Queen's Gambit Declined
1.c4 Nf6 2.Nc3 e6 3.Nf3 d5 4.d4 Be7 5.Bf4 0-0 6.e3 c5 7.dxc5 Bxc5 8.Qc2 Nc6 9.Rd1 Qa5 10.a3 Be7 11.Nd2 e5 12.Bg5 d4 13.Nb3 Qd8 14.Be2 h6 15.Bxf6 Bxf6 16.0-0 Be6 17.Nc5 Qe7 18.Nxe6 Qxe6 19.Nd5 Rad8 20.Bd3 Ne7 21.Nxf6+ Qxf6 22.exd4 exd4 23.Rfe1 Rd7 24.Re4 Nc6 25.Qe2 g6 26.Re1 Kg7 27.b4 b6 28.Qg4 Rfd8 29.h4 h5 30.Qg3 Qd6 31.f4 Re7 32.Rxe7 Nxe7 33.Re5 a5 34.Rxh5 axb4 35.axb4 Qxb4 36.Rb5 Qd2 37.Kh2 Qe3 38.Rxb6 Ra8 39.Qxe3 dxe3 40.Rb2 Ra3 41.Be4 Rc3 ½–½

=== Game 10: Karpov–Korchnoi, ½–½ ===
8 August. Korchnoi navigated Karpov's opening surprise to reach a drawn rook ending.
Match score: Karpov leads 1–0 with 9 draws.

G10, position after 11.Ng5!?

Position: a8 black rook, d8 black queen, e8 black king, f8 black bishop, h8 black rook, c7 black pawn, f7 black pawn, g7 black pawn, h7 black pawn, a6 black pawn, c6 black knight, e6 black bishop, b5 black pawn, c5 black knight, e5 white pawn, g5 white knight, d4 black pawn, b3 white bishop, c3 white pawn, a2 white pawn, b2 white pawn, d2 white knight, f2 white pawn, g2 white pawn, h2 white pawn, a1 white rook, c1 white bishop, d1 white queen, f1 white rook, g1 white king

Karpov introduced the surprising new move 11.Ng5!?
G10, position after 13...Qd3

Position: a8 black rook, e8 black king, f8 black bishop, h8 black rook, c7 black pawn, g7 black pawn, h7 black pawn, a6 black pawn, c6 black knight, e6 black pawn, b5 black pawn, c5 black knight, e5 white pawn, b3 white bishop, c3 white pawn, d3 black queen, a2 white pawn, d2 white knight, f2 white pawn, g2 white pawn, h2 white pawn, a1 white rook, c1 white bishop, d1 white queen, f1 white rook, g1 white king

In this position Karpov played 14.Nf3 allowing the exchange of queens and the game ended in a draw. In 1995, Kasparov won after offering a rook sacrifice with 14.Bc2 Qxc3 15.Nb3!

Korchnoi opted to play the standard book move 10...d4 after his surprise 10...g6?! had led to a loss in game 8. Karpov answered with the theoretical novelty 11.Ng5!? (first diagram), his first important innovation of the match. Korchnoi described this as a move you find once in a century, and the position after move 10 had been studied in chess literature since at least 1914 without uncovering this knight offer. During the match it was speculated that the new move was from Mikhail Tal, but actually Karpov's second, Igor Zaitsev, discovered it in preparation before the match.

Accepting the offered knight is not free, as White regains the piece with advantage after 11...Qxg5 12.Qf3 Kd7 13.Bd5!, and if 12...Bd7 13.Bxf7+ then 13...Kd8 14.cxd4 (Larsen) or 13...Ke7 14.Bd5 Nxe5 15.Qe2 d3 16.Qe1 (Keene) are even worse for Black. Keene also says Black has trouble completing his development after 11...Nxb3 12.Nxe6 fxe6 13.axb3 and gives a long variation ending with Black checkmated that begins 11...Bd5 12.Nxf7 Kxf7 13.Qf3+ Ke6 14.Qg4+.

The critical line after taking the knight was not tested until the year after the championship match. Jan Timman–Vasily Smyslov, 2nd European Chess Club Championship, 1979, continued 11...Qxg5 12.Qf3 0-0-0! 13.Bxe6+ fxe6 14.Qxc6 Qxe5 15.b4 and ended in a 55-move draw. Decades later the evaluation of this line is still considered unsettled and few players have been willing to risk accepting the knight as Black. Although the correctness of 11.Ng5 for White was recognized at once, it failed to become popular, perhaps because this game was drawn and Karpov did not repeat 11.Ng5 later in this match, or because players assume that if Black is willing to enter this unbalanced line then they must have studied it extensively.

After considering how to respond to the sacrifice for 43 minutes, Korchnoi declined the offered knight and tried to exchange queens with 11...dxc3 12.Nxe6 fxe6 13.bxc3 Qd3 (second diagram). Karpov allowed the queen trade with 14.Nf3 and the game was drawn in 44 moves. Karpov analyzed 14.Bc2 Qxc3 15.Qh5+ g6 16.Bxg6+ hxg6 17.Qxh8 Qxa1 as giving White no compensation for the sacrificed material so this was considered safe for Black. Karpov wrote in his memoirs that Korchnoi conducted a brilliant defense.

The diagrammed position after 13...Qd3 occurred again in world championship play in Garry Kasparov–Viswanathan Anand, PCA World Chess Championship 1995, game 10. Kasparov offered a whole rook in order to keep the black king in the center with 14.Bc2 Qxc3 15.Nb3! (15...Nxb3 16.axb3 Qxa1) and won in 38 moves.

Ruy Lopez, Open Defense
1.e4 e5 2.Nf3 Nc6 3.Bb5 a6 4.Ba4 Nf6 5.0-0 Nxe4 6.d4 b5 7.Bb3 d5 8.dxe5 Be6 9.Nbd2 Nc5 10.c3 d4 11.Ng5 dxc3 12.Nxe6 fxe6 13.bxc3 Qd3 14.Nf3 Qxd1 15.Bxd1 Be7 16.Be3 Nd3 17.Bb3 Kf7 18.Rad1 Ndxe5 19.Nxe5+ Nxe5 20.Bf4 Nc4 21.Bxc4 bxc4 22.Rd4 Bd6 23.Be3 Rhb8 24.Rxc4 Rb2 25.a4 Ra2 26.g3 Rb8 27.Rd1 Rbb2 28.Rdd4 Rb1+ 29.Kg2 Rba1 30.Rh4 h6 31.Bc5 e5 32.Ba7 Ke6 33.Rcg4 Be7 34.Rh5 Bf6 35.Rc4 Kd7 36.Bb8 c6 37.Re4 Rxa4 38.c4 Ra5 39.Bxe5 Bxe5 40.Rhxe5 Rxe5 41.Rxe5 Ra4 42.Re4 Ra5 43.h4 h5 44.Rf4 ½–½

=== Game 11: Korchnoi–Karpov, 1–0 ===
10 August. Karpov played quickly and poorly, blundering on move 26 to allow Korchnoi to equalize the match score easily.
Match score: tied 1–1 with 9 draws.

G11, position after 3.e4

Position: a8 black rook, c8 black bishop, d8 black queen, e8 black king, f8 black bishop, g8 black knight, h8 black rook, a7 black pawn, b7 black pawn, d7 black pawn, e7 black pawn, f7 black pawn, g7 black pawn, h7 black pawn, c6 black knight, c5 black pawn, e4 white pawn, g3 white pawn, a2 white pawn, b2 white pawn, c2 white pawn, d2 white pawn, f2 white pawn, g2 white bishop, h2 white pawn, a1 white rook, b1 white knight, c1 white bishop, d1 white queen, e1 white king, g1 white knight, h1 white rook

Larsen gave Korchnoi's 3.e4! transposition into a Siclian Defense an exclamation mark.
G11, position after 26...Rxb3??

Position: c8 black rook, g8 black king, a7 black pawn, c7 black knight, d7 black queen, f7 black pawn, g7 black bishop, h7 black pawn, e6 black pawn, g6 black pawn, d5 black pawn, e5 white pawn, d4 white pawn, f4 white pawn, b3 black rook, e3 white bishop, g3 white pawn, h3 white pawn, b2 white pawn, c2 white rook, e2 white bishop, a1 white rook, f1 white queen, g1 white king

White wins with 27.Qc1!, combining attack and defense.

Korchnoi started the game with 1.g3, a King's Indian Attack, causing Karpov to consider his reply for five minutes before choosing 1...c5. After 2.Bg2 Nc6 3.e4 (first diagram), the game became a Sicilian Defense, an opening Karpov does not like to play as Black.

Karpov's 20...Na5? was an inaccuracy allowing 21.Nc5. Better was 20...Bf8 preparing to remove the knight from the c5 outpost with 21.Nc5 Bxc5 22.dxc5. A few moves later, 22...Nb7? was even weaker. The more active 22...Nc4 was required, even at the cost of a pawn. Finally, 25...b3(?) 26.cxb3 Rxb3?? (second diagram) was a blunder that loses by force. Karpov must have overlooked Korchnoi's reply, 27.Qc1! which combines defense of the white bishop on e3 with a pin of the black knight. Black has no good defense to the threat 28.Bh6, winning the exchange.

Karpov played the game quickly, using only 1 hour and 41 minutes for the entire game compared to Korchnoi's 3 hours and 16 minutes. Harry Golombek said that Karpov's rapid play was "... so he would have plenty of time to regret his errors." Larsen wrote that it was a weak performance by the world champion, and the game was "... passive play by Karpov, weak play by Karpov, and a blunder by Karpov". Karpov later wrote about this game, "I had a reasonable position, but then something inexplicable happened. It was one of those days when apathy sets in, and everything seems to go wrong."

After the loss, Karpov took one of his timeouts to postpone the next game.

Sicilian Defense
1.g3 c5 2.Bg2 Nc6 3.e4 g6 4.d3 Bg7 5.f4 d6 6.Nf3 Nf6 7.0-0 0-0 8.c3 Rb8 9.Qe2 Ne8 10.Be3 Nc7 11.d4 cxd4 12.cxd4 Bg4 13.Rd1 d5 14.e5 Qd7 15.Nc3 Rfc8 16.Qf1 b5 17.h3 Bxf3 18.Bxf3 b4 19.Bg4 e6 20.Na4 Na5 21.Nc5 Qe8 22.Be2 Nb7 23.Nxb7 Rxb7 24.Rdc1 Qd7 25.Rc2 b3 26.axb3 Rxb3 27.Qc1 Rb7 28.Ba6 Rcb8 29.Bxb7 Rxb7 30.Ra3 h6 31.Rac3 Nb5 32.Rc8+ Kh7 33.R2c6 f6 34.Kg2 Qf7 35.Qc2 a5 36.g4 fxe5 37.fxe5 a4 38.Ra8 Na7 39.Ra6 Qe7 40.Rxa4 Rc7 41.Qb3 Nc6 42.Ra1 Nb4 43.Rc1 Rc4 44.Rb8 Rxc1 45.Bxc1 Qc7 46.Rxb4 Qxc1 47.Qd3 h5 48.Rb6 Bh6 49.gxh5 Qg5+ 50.Qg3 Qd2+ 1–0

=== Game 12: Karpov–Korchnoi, ½–½ ===
15 August. Karpov tried a different variation to combat the Open Ruy Lopez, but the result was another drawn rook endgame.
Match score: tied 1–1 with 10 draws.

G12, position after 9.Qe2

Position: a8 black rook, d8 black queen, e8 black king, f8 black bishop, h8 black rook, c7 black pawn, f7 black pawn, g7 black pawn, h7 black pawn, a6 black pawn, c6 black knight, e6 black bishop, b5 black pawn, d5 black pawn, e5 white pawn, e4 black knight, b3 white bishop, f3 white knight, a2 white pawn, b2 white pawn, c2 white pawn, e2 white queen, f2 white pawn, g2 white pawn, h2 white pawn, a1 white rook, b1 white knight, c1 white bishop, f1 white rook, g1 white king

9.Qe2 is the third move Karpov tried in this position.
G12, final position after 44.Rg7

Position: d8 black rook, e7 black king, f7 black pawn, g7 white rook, h6 white pawn, b5 black pawn, e3 white pawn, f2 white pawn, g2 white king

Draw agreed (44...Rh8)

Game 12 was played after Karpov took a timeout following his loss of game 11. Against Korchnoi's Open Ruy Lopez, in games 2 and 4 Karpov played 9.c3, and in games 8 and 10 he played 9.Nbd2, and all were draws. This time he tried the other common move, 9.Qe2, (first diagram) and obtained a small advantage, but the result was the same. Karpov was unhappy to settle for a draw and thought that he could have made the game more difficult for Korchnoi by keeping his extra pawn, but Larsen did not think that White ever had enough to win.

After 44.Rg7 Karpov offered a draw (second diagram), but Korchnoi responded only with an angry hand gesture as he had insisted that all draw offers be made through the arbiter. Karpov left before Korchnoi sealed his move. Korchnoi protested to the arbiter, Lothar Schmid, but Schmid misunderstood and thought that Korchnoi was accepting the draw offer so Schmid communicated this to the Karpov team. The position is a draw, so in order not to embarrass Schmid, Korchnoi accepted the draw and the game was not resumed.

Ruy Lopez, Open Defense, Howell Attack
1.e4 e5 2.Nf3 Nc6 3.Bb5 a6 4.Ba4 Nf6 5.0-0 Nxe4 6.d4 b5 7.Bb3 d5 8.dxe5 Be6 9.Qe2 Be7 10.Rd1 0-0 11.c4 bxc4 12.Bxc4 Bc5 13.Be3 Bxe3 14.Qxe3 Qb8 15.Bb3 Na5 16.Ne1 Qb6 17.Qxb6 cxb6 18.f3 Nxb3 19.axb3 Nc5 20.b4 Nd7 21.Nd3 g5 22.Nc3 Rfc8 23.Nf2 d4 24.Ne2 d3 25.Nxd3 Bc4 26.Ng3 Bxd3 27.Rxd3 Nxe5 28.Rd5 Ng6 29.Rxg5 Rc2 30.b3 Rb2 31.Nf5 Rxb3 32.h4 Kf8 33.h5 Ne7 34.Nxe7 Kxe7 35.Re1+ Kf8 36.Re4 a5 37.Reg4 Ke7 38.bxa5 Rxa5 39.h6 Rxg5 40.Rxg5 b5 41.Rg7 Rb1+ 42.Kh2 Rd1 43.Rxh7 Rd8 44.Rg7 Rh8 ½–½

=== Game 13: Korchnoi–Karpov, 0–1 ===
17 and 20 August. Korchnoi threw away his chance at a draw with 56.Qh4. His queen was effectively trapped and unable to come to the king's defense.
Match score: Karpov leads 2–1 with 10 draws.

Queen's Gambit Declined
1.c4 Nf6 2.Nc3 e6 3.Nf3 d5 4.d4 Be7 5.Bg5 h6 6.Bh4 0-0 7.Rc1 b6 8.Bxf6 Bxf6 9.cxd5 exd5 10.g3 c6 11.Bg2 Bf5 12.0-0 Qd6 13.e3 Nd7 14.Ne1 Rfe8 15.Nd3 g6 16.Nf4 Bg7 17.g4 Be6 18.h3 Nf8 19.Nxe6 Nxe6 20.Qd3 Rad8 21.Rc2 Nc7 22.Na4 Qd7 23.b3 Re6 24.Nc3 Rd6 25.b4 Bf8 26.Ne2 b5 27.Qb3 Na8 28.a4 bxa4 29.Qxa4 Nb6 30.Qb3 Rb8 31.Nf4 Nc4 32.Qa4 f5 33.gxf5 Qxf5 34.Qxa7 Rxb4 35.Ra2 Qc8 36.Rc1 Rb7 37.Qa4 Rf7 38.Rxc4 dxc4 39.Qxc4 Qf5 40.Nd3 Bg7 41.Ra7 Rdf6 42.Rxf7 Rxf7 43.d5 Be5 44.dxc6 Kg7 45.Be4 Qg5+ 46.Kf1 Bd6 47.Bd5 Re7 48.Bf3 h5 49.Bd1 Qf5 50.Ke2 Re4 51.Qc3+ Qf6 52.Qb3 Qf5 53.Qb7+ Re7 54.Qb2+ Kh7 55.Qd4 Bc7 56.Qh4 Re4 57.f4 Bb6 58.Bc2 Rxe3+ 59.Kd2 Qa5+ 60.Kd1 Qa1+ 61.Kd2 Re4 0–1

=== Game 14: Karpov–Korchnoi, 1–0 ===
19 and 20 August. Karpov won game 14 after his opponent's pieces were effectively trapped.
Match score: Karpov leads 3–1 with 10 draws.

Ruy Lopez, Open
1.e4 e5 2.Nf3 Nc6 3.Bb5 a6 4.Ba4 Nf6 5.0-0 Nxe4 6.d4 b5 7.Bb3 d5 8.dxe5 Be6 9.c3 Bc5 10.Nbd2 0-0 11.Bc2 Bf5 12.Nb3 Bg4 13.h3 Bh5 14.g4 Bg6 15.Bxe4 dxe4 16.Nxc5 exf3 17.Bf4 Qxd1 18.Raxd1 Nd8 19.Rd7 Ne6 20.Nxe6 fxe6 21.Be3 Rac8 22.Rfd1 Be4 23.Bc5 Rfe8 24.R7d4 Bd5 25.b3 a5 26.Kh2 Ra8 27.Kg3 Ra6 28.h4 Rc6 29.Rxd5 exd5 30.Rxd5 Rce6 31.Bd4 c6 32.Rc5 Rf8 33.a4 bxa4 34.bxa4 g6 35.Rxa5 Ree8 36.Ra7 Rf7 37.Ra6 Rc7 38.Bc5 Rcc8 39.Bd6 Ra8 40.Rxc6 Rxa4 41.Kxf3 h5 42.gxh5 gxh5 43.c4 Ra2 44.Rb6 Kf7 45.c5 Ra4 46.c6 Ke6 47.c7 Kd7 48.Rb8 Rc8 49.Ke3 Rxh4 50.e6+ 1–0

=== Game 15: Korchnoi–Karpov, ½–½ ===
22 August. Korchnoi played the Catalan Opening for the first time in match. Karpov responded with a sharp pawn sacrifice which Korchnoi did not try to refute and the game ended in a draw.
Match score: Karpov leads 3–1 with 11 draws.

G15, position after 13...e5

Position: a8 black rook, c8 black bishop, f8 black rook, g8 black king, a7 black pawn, e7 black queen, f7 black pawn, g7 black pawn, h7 black pawn, f6 black knight, e5 black pawn, d4 white queen, c3 white knight, g3 white pawn, a2 white pawn, b2 white pawn, e2 white pawn, f2 white pawn, h2 white pawn, a1 white rook, c1 white bishop, e1 white king, h1 white rook

Black has compensation for the pawn.
G15, final position after 25.Rxa2

Position: c8 black rook, g8 black king, a7 black pawn, f7 black pawn, h7 black pawn, f6 black pawn, e5 black pawn, c3 white knight, f3 white pawn, g3 white pawn, a2 white rook, e2 white pawn, f2 white king, h2 white pawn

Draw agreed (Black to move)

At move 14 (first diagram) Black is a pawn down but has a small lead in development and attacking chances on the kingside. For example, Larsen assesses 14.Qa4 Qb7 15.e4 Bh3 as "very unpleasant for White". Instead, Korchnoi returned the pawn with 14.Qh4 Rb8! 15.Bg5 ("unambitious" — Keene) Rxb2. To try for a win White must instead keep the extra pawn with 15.a3 or 15.0-0 Rb4, but after two consecutive losses Korchnoi seemed satisfied to draw.

Catalan Opening
1.c4 Nf6 2.Nc3 e6 3.Nf3 d5 4.d4 Be7 5.g3 0-0 6.Bg2 dxc4 7.Ne5 Nc6 8.Bxc6 bxc6 9.Nxc6 Qe8 10.Nxe7+ Qxe7 11.Qa4 c5 12.Qxc4 cxd4 13.Qxd4 e5 14.Qh4 Rb8 15.Bg5 Rxb2 16.0-0 Qe6 17.Bxf6 Qxf6 18.Qxf6 gxf6 19.Rab1 Rxb1 20.Rxb1 Be6 21.f3 Rc8 22.Rc1 Rb8 23.Rc2 Rc8 24.Kf2 Bxa2 25.Rxa2 ½–½

=== Game 16: Karpov–Korchnoi, ½–½ ===
24 August. For the first time in the match, Korchnoi played the French Defense. Karpov obtained a small advantage, but the rook endgame was a draw.
Match score: Karpov leads 3–1 with 12 draws.

G16, position after 11...Bc5

Position: a8 black rook, e8 black king, g8 black knight, h8 black rook, a7 black pawn, b7 black pawn, f7 black pawn, g7 black pawn, h7 black pawn, c5 black bishop, d5 black pawn, b3 white pawn, b2 white pawn, c2 white pawn, e2 white knight, f2 white pawn, g2 white pawn, h2 white pawn, a1 white rook, c1 white bishop, e1 white king, h1 white rook

White has an advantage. Keene recommended 12.Nc3 instead of 12.Bd2.
G16, final position after 42...Rxb2

Position: g7 black pawn, h7 black pawn, c6 black pawn, d6 black king, f6 black pawn, a5 white pawn, d5 black pawn, d4 white king, f4 white pawn, c3 white pawn, b2 black rook, g2 white pawn, h2 white pawn, e1 white rook

The sealed move was 42...Rxb2. Draw agreed.

Typhoon Elaine struck Luzon causing more than 24 hours of rain. The playing hall lost power, but it was restored in time to play game 16 on schedule.

Korchnoi's seconds convinced him to give up the Open Ruy Lopez for this game. Keene says that they had prepared a different half-open defense, but they found a hole in their analysis at the last minute. Korchnoi decided to play the French Defense as he had a lot of experience with it. Karpov meets the French with the Tarrasch Variation, 3.Nd2. The Tarrasch does not give Black many chances to win, but Black has a good chance to draw which might make it less suitable for White in this match as only wins count. All 7 games in the French in their 1974 Candidates Final match in Moscow were drawn.

In 1974, the games went 5.Ngf3 Nc6 6.Bb5. Karpov played 5.Bb5+ instead. Korchnoi could transpose to the 1974 line with 5...Nc6 6.Ngf3, but he decided to simplify with 5...Bd7 and Karpov got a small advantage in the endgame.

At move 12 (first diagram), Keene recommended 12.Nc3 as White has an edge after either 12...Nf6 13.Na4 or 12...0-0-0 13.Ra5 (Hort–Ivkov, Wijk aan Zee, 1970). Instead, the game continued 12.Bd2 Ne7 13.Nf4. Larsen suggested 13.Bc3 (Euwe–Botvinnik, World Chess Championship 1948) is better.

Korchnoi sealed the move 42...Rxb2 (second diagram) and a draw was agreed before resumption.

French Defense, Tarrasch Variation
1.e4 e6 2.d4 d5 3.Nd2 c5 4.exd5 exd5 5.Bb5+ Bd7 6.Qe2+ Qe7 7.Bxd7+ Nxd7 8.dxc5 Nxc5 9.Nb3 Qxe2+ 10.Nxe2 Nxb3 11.axb3 Bc5 12.Bd2 Ne7 13.Nf4 0-0 14.0-0 Rfd8 15.Nd3 Bb6 16.c3 f6 17.Rfd1 Kf7 18.Kf1 Nf5 19.Be1 Ne7 20.Nb4 Rd7 21.Rd3 Rad8 22.Rad1 Ke6 23.Bd2 Nc6 24.Nxc6 bxc6 25.b4 Kf7 26.Be3 Bxe3 27.Rxe3 Rb8 28.Re2 Rb5 29.Ra1 Rdb7 30.Rd2 Ke6 31.Ra6 R5b6 32.Ra2 Kd6 33.Ke2 Re7+ 34.Kd3 a6 35.Rd1 Kc7 36.Raa1 Kd8 37.f3 Re5 38.Kd4 Kc7 39.Re1 Kd6 40.f4 Rxe1 41.Rxe1 a5 42.bxa5 Rxb2 ½–½

=== Game 17: Korchnoi–Karpov, 0–1 ===
26 August. Korchnoi built a winning position, but then made a series of mistakes in time trouble that squandered his advantage until a final blunder cost him the game.
Match score: Karpov leads 4–1 with 12 draws.

G17, position after 22...Qxa6

Position: a8 black rook, g8 black king, g7 black pawn, h7 black pawn, a6 black queen, f6 black knight, a5 black knight, c5 black rook, e5 black pawn, a4 white pawn, d4 black pawn, f4 white pawn, d3 white queen, g3 white knight, g2 white pawn, h2 white pawn, b1 white rook, c1 white bishop, f1 white rook, g1 white king

Korchnoi played 23.Qxa6(?) and his position declined for the rest of the game. The correct move is 23.Rb8+.
G17, position after 38...Rc6!

Position: h7 white rook, c6 black rook, a4 white pawn, e4 black knight, a3 white rook, d2 black knight, e2 black king, g2 white pawn, h2 white pawn, g1 white king

Black threatens 39...Rc1# and 40.g3 or 40.g4 are the only moves to draw. Instead, Korchnoi blundered into mate with 39.Ra1?? Nf3+! White resigns.

Before the game, Korchnoi disputed Zukhar's presence in the hall with the organizers which led to him making his first move with more than ten minutes already gone on his clock. Korchnoi still managed to build up a winning position, but time trouble together with stubborn defense by Karpov eventually led Korchnoi to a series of blunders and his advantage evaporated.

Korchnoi had a solid advantage in the middle game, but 23.Qxa6(?) was a mistake (first diagram). "Better was 23.Rb8+ Kf7 24.Rb5 displacing Black's king, keeping queens on the board, and introducing unpleasant threats such as fxe5 and Qf5. Incredibly Korchnoi did not even consider this obvious manoeuvre and from now on we witness his decline."—Keene

After 38...Rc6! Black threatened checkmate with ...Rc1 (second diagram). Only 39.g4 or 39.g3 would allow White to draw as 39.h4?? Rc1+ 40.Kh2 Nf1+ 41.Kh3 Nf2# is mate. In time trouble, Korchnoi played 39.Ra1?? and resigned after 39...Nf3+! as he will be mated after 40.gxf3 Rg6+ 41.Kh1 Nf2# or 40.Kh1 Nf2#.

Karpov held a party after every win, with a cake decorated in icing with the winning position. Karpov was served the white king as the first slice. Because of this loss and the ongoing dispute over Zukhar, Korchnoi took two timeouts to postpone game 18.

Nimzo-Indian Defense
1.c4 Nf6 2.Nc3 e6 3.d4 Bb4 4.e3 0-0 5.Bd3 c5 6.d5 b5 7.dxe6 fxe6 8.cxb5 a6 9.Nge2 d5 10.0-0 e5 11.a3 axb5 12.Bxb5 Bxc3 13.bxc3 Ba6 14.Rb1 Qd6 15.c4 d4 16.Ng3 Nc6 17.a4 Na5 18.Qd3 Qe6 19.exd4 cxd4 20.c5 Rfc8 21.f4 Rxc5 22.Bxa6 Qxa6 23.Qxa6 Rxa6 24.Ba3 Rd5 25.Nf5 Kf7 26.fxe5 Rxe5 27.Rb5 Nc4 28.Rb7+ Ke6 29.Nxd4+ Kd5 30.Nf3 Nxa3 31.Nxe5 Kxe5 32.Re7+ Kd4 33.Rxg7 Nc4 34.Rf4+ Ne4 35.Rd7+ Ke3 36.Rf3+ Ke2 37.Rxh7 Ncd2 38.Ra3 Rc6 39.Ra1 Nf3+ 0–1

=== Game 18: Karpov–Korchnoi, ½–½ ===
2 and 3 September. Korchnoi played the Pirc Defense for the first time in the match and held a draw.
Match score: Karpov leads 4–1 with 13 draws.

G18, position after 40...Kg5

Position: e8 black bishop, c7 black pawn, e7 black rook, g6 black pawn, c5 white rook, d5 white pawn, e5 black pawn, g5 black king, a4 black pawn, e4 white bishop, g4 white pawn, a3 white pawn, g3 white king, b2 white pawn

Adjourned position after 40...Kg5.
Karpov sealed 41.Bd3.
G18, final position after 64...Kf3

Position: b6 white king, e5 black rook, b4 white pawn, a3 white pawn, f3 black king, g2 black pawn, c1 white rook

Draw agreed

Korchnoi spent his final two timeouts before the 18th game, leaving him with no more timeouts unless the match went past 24 games. He again varied his defense, playing the Pirc for the first time in the match. Korchnoi had used the Pirc to beat Fischer at the 1962 Candidates Tournament.

Against the Pirc, Karpov had recently played the modest Two Knights Variation, 4.Nf3, instead of the more aggressive Austrian Attack with 4.f4. This time Karpov varied with 8.Qd3 as in previous games he had played 8.Qd2 (for example, against András Adorján at Las Palmas 1977 and against Jan Timman at Tilburg 1977). The new move leaves the d2-square free for White's king knight. White has also tried 8.d5 and 8.Re1. Larsen commented that 8.Qd3 doesn't change the character of the position, but that this type of move can be useful in a match to avoid an opponent's prepared analysis.

In the adjourned position after 40...Kg5 (first diagram), Black's pieces are passive and he has four isolated pawns. Black does have pressure against White's g-pawn. Keene commented that Korchnoi did not like passive defense, but their analysis showed that active play was too dangerous for Black so Korchnoi did as little as possible. This was enough to hold the draw (second diagram).

Pirc Defense
1.e4 d6 2.d4 Nf6 3.Nc3 g6 4.Nf3 Bg7 5.Be2 0-0 6.0-0 Bg4 7.Be3 Nc6 8.Qd3 e5 9.d5 Nb4 10.Qd2 a5 11.h3 Bd7 12.Bg5 Qe8 13.Nh2 Kh8 14.a3 Na6 15.Bh6 Bxh6 16.Qxh6 Ng8 17.Qe3 f5 18.exf5 Bxf5 19.Rac1 Nf6 20.g4 Bd7 21.f4 exf4 22.Qxf4 Nc5 23.Rce1 Nfe4 24.Qe3 Qe5 25.Nxe4 Nxe4 26.Bf3 Ng5 27.Qxe5+ dxe5 28.Bg2 Rxf1+ 29.Nxf1 Re8 30.Nd2 a4 31.Re3 Kg7 32.Kf2 Re7 33.c4 b6 34.Rc3 h5 35.Kg3 hxg4 36.hxg4 Be8 37.c5 bxc5 38.Ne4 Nxe4+ 39.Bxe4 Kf6 40.Rxc5 Kg5 41.Bd3 Rf7 42.Be2 Rh7 43.Bf3 Rf7 44.Rc4 Rh7 45.Rb4 Re7 46.Kf2 Bd7 47.Kg3 Be8 48.Kf2 Bd7 49.Ke3 e4 50.Bxe4 Kxg4 51.Kf2 Kg5 52.Bc2 Re5 53.Bxa4 Bxa4 54.Rxa4 Rxd5 55.Ke3 Rb5 56.b4 Re5+ 57.Kd4 Kf4 58.Ra8 g5 59.Rc8 Re4+ 60.Kd5 Re5+ 61.Kc6 g4 62.Rxc7 g3 63.Kb6 g2 64.Rc1 Kf3 ½–½

=== Game 19: Korchnoi–Karpov, ½–½ ===
7 September. Korchnoi played the Catalan for the second time, but Karpov again equalized without difficulty to draw.
Match score: Karpov leads 4–1 with 14 draws.

G19, position after 17...bxc5

Position: a8 black rook, e8 black rook, g8 black king, b7 black bishop, f7 black pawn, g7 black pawn, h7 black pawn, d6 black bishop, e6 black queen, a5 black pawn, c5 black pawn, d5 black pawn, e4 black knight, b3 white pawn, d3 white knight, g3 white pawn, a2 white pawn, b2 white bishop, e2 white pawn, f2 white pawn, g2 white bishop, h2 white pawn, c1 white rook, d1 white queen, f1 white rook, g1 white king

Black's hanging pawns control space and his pieces are active.
G19, final position after 39.Rc8

Position: c8 white rook, a7 black rook, e7 black bishop, h7 black pawn, a6 black rook, e6 black king, g6 black pawn, c5 black pawn, f5 black pawn, g5 white pawn, e4 black pawn, h4 white pawn, a3 white pawn, e3 white pawn, b2 white bishop, c2 white rook, f2 white pawn, g2 white king

Draw agreed with Black to move

Karpov took his second timeout to postpone game 19, leaving him one more timeout to use before game 24. Keene suggested that the Karpov team wanted extra time to recover from the effects of a party given by Imelda Marcos after game 18 to celebrate her recent nomination for the Nobel Peace Prize. Both teams enjoyed the all-night event, but bad weather prevented Marcos from attending.

Korchnoi could have transposed into game 15 with 6.Nc3 but he chose the more passive 6.Nbd2, a line he had also played before. In the game position at move 8, Korchnoi–Petrosian, 1977 Candidates Quarterfinal, game 11, continued 8.b3 Nbd7 9.Bb2 c5 and Black had no problems.

After 17...bxc5 (first diagram), Black has hanging pawns. Although hanging pawns are a potential weakness and Korchnoi liked to play against them, Karpov often played with them in openings such as the Queen's Gambit and the Queen's Indian. In this position they control space and Black's pieces are very active.

Instead of 30.g4?!, Keene says Korchnoi could achieve a cleaner draw with 30.Rxc5 (threatening to double rooks on the 7th rank) Ke8 31.Rcc7 Bd6 32.Rxd6 Rxd6 33.Rxg7.

Catalan Opening, Closed, 5.Nf3
1.c4 Nf6 2.g3 e6 3.Bg2 d5 4.Nf3 Be7 5.d4 0-0 6.Nbd2 b6 7.0-0 Bb7 8.cxd5 exd5 9.Ne5 Nbd7 10.Ndf3 c5 11.b3 a5 12.Bb2 Ne4 13.Rc1 Re8 14.Nxd7 Qxd7 15.Ne5 Qe6 16.Nd3 Bd6 17.dxc5 bxc5 18.e3 a4 19.bxa4 Ba6 20.Re1 Bxd3 21.Qxd3 Rxa4 22.Qb3 Raa8 23.Bxe4 dxe4 24.Qxe6 Rxe6 25.a3 Ra4 26.Red1 f6 27.Kf1 Kf7 28.Rc2 Be7 29.Rd7 Rb6 30.g4 Ke6 31.Rc7 Ra8 32.Rd2 g6 33.Kg2 f5 34.g5 Rd6 35.Rc2 Rda6 36.h4 R8a7 37.Rc8 Ra8 38.Rc7 R8a7 39.Rc8 ½–½

=== Game 20: Karpov–Korchnoi, ½–½ ===
9 and 10 September. Match score: Karpov leads 4–1 with 15 draws.

Caro–Kann Defense
1.e4 c6 2.d4 d5 3.Nd2 dxe4 4.Nxe4 Nf6 5.Nxf6+ exf6 6.Bc4 Nd7 7.Ne2 Bd6 8.0-0 0-0 9.Bf4 Nb6 10.Bd3 Be6 11.c3 Nd5 12.Bxd6 Qxd6 13.Qd2 Rad8 14.Rfe1 g6 15.Rad1 Kg7 16.Be4 Nc7 17.b3 Rfe8 18.Bb1 Bg4 19.h3 Bxe2 20.Rxe2 Rxe2 21.Qxe2 Nd5 22.Qd2 Nf4 23.Be4 f5 24.Bf3 h6 25.h4 Ne6 26.Qe3 Nc7 27.c4 f4 28.Qc3 Qf6 29.Qa5 Ne6 30.d5 cxd5 31.cxd5 b6 32.Qa4 Nc5 33.Qxa7 Nd7 34.d6 Qxh4 35.Qc7 Qf6 36.b4 h5 37.a4 Kh6 38.b5 g5 39.Bc6 Nc5 40.d7 Kg7 41.Re1 Ne6 42.Qd6 g4 43.Kf1 g3 44.Qe5 h4 45.a5 bxa5 46.b6 Qxe5 47.Rxe5 Rb8 48.b7 Nd8 49.Re8 Kf6 50.fxg3 fxg3 51.Ke2 Kg7 52.Bf3 a4 53.Re4 Kf6 54.Rxa4 Ke7 55.Rxh4 Kxd7 56.Rf4 Kd6 57.Rb4 Kc7 58.Rc4+ Kd7 59.Bg4+ Ke8 60.Re4+ Kf8 61.Bd7 Rxb7 62.Re8+ Kg7 63.Rxd8 Rb2+ ½–½

=== Game 21: Korchnoi–Karpov, 1–0 ===
12 and 13 September. Karpov introduced a risky new sacrifice with his 12th move. Korchnoi, however, seemed to refute the sacrifice by rejecting it. Korchnoi won convincingly after a long ending. About 40 years after this match, the new move in the opening was reevaluated by modern computers. This way of playing is used by several of the world's best players.
Match score: Karpov leads 4–2 with 15 draws.

Queen's Gambit Declined
1.c4 Nf6 2.Nc3 e6 3.Nf3 d5 4.d4 Be7 5.Bf4 0-0 6.e3 c5 7.dxc5 Bxc5 8.Qc2 Nc6 9.Rd1 Qa5 10.a3 Re8 11.Nd2 e5 12.Bg5 Nd4 13.Qb1 Bf5 14.Bd3 e4 15.Bc2 Nxc2+ 16.Qxc2 Qa6 17.Bxf6 Qxf6 18.Nb3 Bd6 19.Rxd5 Re5 20.Nd4 Rc8 21.Rxe5 Qxe5 22.Nxf5 Qxf5 23.0-0 Rxc4 24.Rd1 Qe5 25.g3 a6 26.Qb3 b5 27.a4 Rb4 28.Qd5 Qxd5 29.Rxd5 Bf8 30.axb5 a5 31.Rd8 Rxb2 32.Ra8 f5 33.Rxa5 Bb4 34.Ra8+ Kf7 35.Na4 Rb1+ 36.Kg2 Bd6 37.Ra7+ Kf6 38.b6 Bb8 39.Ra8 Be5 40.Nc5 Bd6 41.b7 Ke7 42.Rg8 Be5 43.f4 exf3+ 44.Kxf3 Kf7 45.Rc8 Ke7 46.h3 h5 47.Rg8 Kf7 48.Rd8 g5 49.g4 hxg4+ 50.hxg4 Ke7 51.Rg8 fxg4+ 52.Kxg4 Kf7 53.Rc8 Bd6 54.e4 Rg1+ 55.Kf5 g4 56.e5 Rf1+ 57.Ke4 Re1+ 58.Kd5 Rd1+ 59.Nd3 Rxd3+ 60.Kc4 1–0

=== Game 22: Karpov–Korchnoi, ½–½ ===
14 September. Match score: Karpov leads 4–2 with 16 draws.

French Defense, Tarrasch Variation
1.e4 e6 2.d4 d5 3.Nd2 c5 4.exd5 exd5 5.Bb5+ Bd7 6.Qe2+ Be7 7.dxc5 Nf6 8.Nb3 0-0 9.Be3 Re8 10.Nf3 Bxc5 11.Nxc5 Qa5+ 12.Qd2 Qxb5 13.0-0-0 b6 14.Nxd7 Nbxd7 15.Kb1 Ne4 16.Qd3 Qxd3 17.Rxd3 Ndf6 18.h3 Nc5 19.Rdd1 Ne6 20.c3 b5 21.Nd4 a6 22.Nc2 a5 23.Rd3 Rab8 24.Rhd1 h6 25.f4 Rbc8 26.g4 d4 27.cxd4 Nd5 28.Rf1 b4 29.Bd2 Re7 30.f5 Ng5 31.Ne3 Nf6 32.d5 Nxh3 33.d6 Rd7 34.Nd5 Nxd5 35.Rxd5 Ra8 36.Be3 Ng5 37.Bb6 Ne4 38.Rfd1 a4 39.R5d4 Re8 40.Rxb4 Rxd6 41.Rxd6 Nxd6 42.Bc7 Re1+ 43.Kc2 Ne8 44.Ba5 a3 45.Rb8 Re7 46.Bb4 Re2+ 47.Kd3 axb2 48.Bd2 Re7 49.a4 Rd7+ 50.Kc2 Kh7 51.Rxb2 h5 52.gxh5 Nd6 53.Ra2 Nxf5 54.a5 Nd4+ 55.Kc3 Nc6 56.a6 Rd5 57.Bf4 Rf5 58.Bd6 Rd5 59.Bg3 Rg5 60.Bf2 Rxh5 61.Kc4 Na5+ 62.Kc3 Nc6 63.Ra4 Kg8 64.Kc4 Na5+ ½–½

=== Game 23: Korchnoi–Karpov, ½–½ ===
16 September. Match score: Karpov leads 4–2 with 17 draws.

Queen's Gambit Declined
1.c4 Nf6 2.Nc3 e6 3.Nf3 d5 4.d4 Be7 5.Bf4 0-0 6.e3 c5 7.dxc5 Bxc5 8.Qc2 Nc6 9.Rd1 Qa5 10.a3 Be7 11.Nd2 e5 12.Bg5 d4 13.Nb3 Qb6 14.Bxf6 Bxf6 15.Nd5 Qd8 16.Bd3 g6 17.exd4 Nxd4 18.Nxd4 exd4 19.Nxf6+ Qxf6 20.0-0 Be6 21.Rfe1 Rac8 22.b3 Rfd8 23.Be4 Rc7 24.Qd2 Bg4 25.f3 Be6 26.a4 b6 27.a5 b5 28.cxb5 Bxb3 29.Rb1 Bd5 30.b6 axb6 31.Rxb6 Rc6 32.Rxc6 Bxc6 33.Bd3 Bd7 34.a6 Bf5 35.Qf4 Kg7 36.Bxf5 Qxf5 37.Qxf5 gxf5 38.Ra1 d3 39.Kf2 Re8 40.Ra2 Re7 41.Rd2 Re6 42.a7 ½–½

=== Game 24: Karpov–Korchnoi, ½–½ ===
19 and 20 September. Match score: Karpov leads 4–2 with 18 draws.

Ruy Lopez, Open Defense
1.e4 e5 2.Nf3 Nc6 3.Bb5 a6 4.Ba4 Nf6 5.0-0 Nxe4 6.d4 b5 7.Bb3 d5 8.dxe5 Be6 9.c3 Be7 10.Bc2 Nc5 11.h3 0-0 12.Re1 Qd7 13.Nd4 Nxd4 14.cxd4 Nb7 15.Nd2 c5 16.dxc5 Nxc5 17.Nf3 Bf5 18.Be3 Rac8 19.Rc1 Bxc2 20.Rxc2 Ne6 21.Rd2 Rfd8 22.Qb3 Rc4 23.Red1 Qb7 24.a3 g6 25.Qa2 a5 26.b3 Rc3 27.a4 bxa4 28.bxa4 Rc4 29.Rd3 Kg7 30.Qd2 Rxa4 31.Bh6+ Kg8 32.Rxd5 Rxd5 33.Qxd5 Qxd5 34.Rxd5 Bf8 35.Bxf8 Kxf8 36.g3 Ke7 37.Rb5 Nc7 38.Rc5 Ne6 39.Rb5 Nd8 40.Kg2 h6 41.Nd2 Ra1 42.Nc4 Nc6 43.Rc5 Kd7 44.Nb6+ Kc7 45.Nc8 Kxc8 ½–½

=== Game 25: Korchnoi–Karpov, ½–½ ===
23 and 24 September. Match score: Karpov leads 4–2 with 19 draws.

English Opening
1.c4 Nf6 2.Nc3 e5 3.g3 Bb4 4.Qb3 Nc6 5.Nd5 Bc5 6.e3 0-0 7.Bg2 Nxd5 8.cxd5 Ne7 9.Ne2 d6 10.0-0 c6 11.d4 exd4 12.exd4 Bb6 13.Bg5 Bd7 14.a4 h6 15.Bxe7 Qxe7 16.Bf3 Rab8 17.a5 Bc7 18.Qc3 Rfc8 19.Nf4 Bd8 20.Rfe1 Qf8 21.Qb3 Bg5 22.Ne2 Bf6 23.Rad1 c5 24.Be4 Qd8 25.Qa2 Bg4 26.dxc5 Rxc5 27.b4 Rc7 28.Qb3 Rbc8 29.f3 Bd7 30.Qe3 a6 31.Bd3 Bb2 32.Kg2 Qf6 33.Rb1 Ba4 34.Nf4 g6 35.Re2 Bc1 36.Qe4 Kf8 37.b5 axb5 38.Qb4 Rc5 39.Rxc1 Rxc1 40.Nxg6+ Kg7 41.Ne7 R1c4 42.Bxc4 Rxc4 43.Qxd6 Rc3 44.f4 Qxd6 45.Nf5+ Kg6 46.Nxd6 Bb3 47.f5+ Kg7 48.Ne8+ Kf8 49.Nf6 Kg7 50.Nh5+ Kf8 51.Nf4 Bc4 52.Re5 Ra3 53.d6 Ra2+ 54.Kf3 Rd2 55.Re7 Rxd6 56.Rxb7 Ra6 57.Rb6 Rxa5 58.Rxh6 b4 59.Rc6 Bb5 60.Rc1 b3 61.Rb1 Bc4 62.Ke4 Ra2 63.Kd4 Rc2 64.Nd3 Bxd3 65.Kxd3 Rxh2 66.Rxb3 Kg7 67.Ke4 Ra2 68.Kf4 Ra4+ 69.Kg5 Ra5 70.g4 Rc5 71.Kh5 Ra5 72.Rf3 Rb5 73.g5 Rb1 74.f6+ Kh7 75.Rh3 Rg1 76.Rh2 Rg3 77.Rh1 Rg2 78.Ra1 Rh2+ 79.Kg4 Kg6 80.Ra8 Rg2+ ½–½

=== Game 26: Karpov–Korchnoi, ½–½ ===
26 September. Match score: Karpov leads 4–2 with 20 draws.

English Opening
1.c4 e5 2.Nc3 d6 3.g3 f5 4.Bg2 Nc6 5.d3 Nf6 6.e3 Be7 7.Nge2 0-0 8.0-0 Qe8 9.f4 Bd8 10.a3 Rb8 11.b4 Be6 12.Nd5 b5 13.Bb2 bxc4 14.dxc4 e4 15.Nxf6+ Bxf6 16.Bxf6 Rxf6 17.Rc1 a5 18.b5 Nd8 19.Rf2 Nb7 20.Bf1 Nc5 21.Nc3 Bf7 22.Nd5 Bxd5 23.cxd5 Nd3 24.Bxd3 exd3 25.Qxd3 Qxb5 26.Qxb5 Rxb5 27.Rxc7 Rf7 ½–½

=== Game 27: Korchnoi–Karpov, 0–1 ===
28 September. Match score: Karpov leads 5–2 with 20 draws.

English Opening, Four Knights, Kingside Fianchetto
1.c4 Nf6 2.Nc3 e5 3.Nf3 Nc6 4.g3 Bb4 5.Nd5 Nxd5 6.cxd5 Nd4 7.Nxd4 exd4 8.Qc2 Qe7 9.Bg2 Bc5 10.0-0 0-0 11.e3 Bb6 12.a4 dxe3 13.dxe3 a5 14.Bd2 Bc5 15.Bc3 d6 16.Qd2 b6 17.Rfe1 Bd7 18.e4 Rfe8 19.Kh1 c6 20.e5 cxd5 21.Bxd5 Rad8 22.Qf4 Qf8 23.Qf3 dxe5 24.Bxe5 Bg4 25.Qxg4 Rxd5 26.Bc3 Red8 27.Kg2 Bd4 28.Rac1 g6 29.Qe2 Qd6 30.Bxd4 Rxd4 31.Qb5 Rb4 32.Re8+ Kg7 33.Rxd8 Qxd8 34.Qe2 Qd5+ 35.f3 Rxa4 36.Rc2 Rd4 37.Qe3 b5 38.h4 h5 39.Qe2 a4 40.Qe3 b4 41.Rf2 0–1

=== Game 28: Karpov–Korchnoi, 0–1 ===
30 September and 1 October. The only game of the match that Karpov lost playing White.
Match score: Karpov leads 5–3 with 20 draws.

Ruy Lopez, Open Defense
1.e4 e5 2.Nf3 Nc6 3.Bb5 a6 4.Ba4 Nf6 5.0-0 Nxe4 6.d4 b5 7.Bb3 d5 8.dxe5 Be6 9.c3 Nc5 10.Bc2 Bg4 11.Re1 Be7 12.Nbd2 Qd7 13.Nb3 Ne6 14.h3 Bh5 15.Bf5 Ncd8 16.Be3 a5 17.Bc5 a4 18.Bxe7 Qxe7 19.Nbd2 c6 20.b4 Ng5 21.Qe2 g6 22.Bg4 Bxg4 23.hxg4 Nde6 24.Qe3 h5 25.Nxg5 Qxg5 26.Qxg5 Nxg5 27.gxh5 Rxh5 28.Nf1 Rh4 29.Rad1 Ke7 30.f3 Ne6 31.Ne3 Rd8 32.Ng4 Ng5 33.Ne3 Ne6 34.Ng4 Ng7 35.Ne3 Nf5 36.Nc2 Rc4 37.Rd3 d4 38.g4 Ng7 39.Nxd4 Ne6 40.Red1 Nxd4 41.cxd4 Rxb4 42.Kf2 c5 43.d5 Rb2+ 44.Kg3 Rxa2 45.Re3 b4 46.e6 Ra3 47.Re2 fxe6 48.Rxe6+ Kf7 49.Rde1 Rd7 50.Rb6 Rd3 51.Ree6 R3xd5 52.Rxg6 a3 53.Rbf6+ Ke7 54.Re6+ Kf8 55.Ref6+ Ke7 56.Re6+ Kd8 57.Ra6 Rb7 58.Rg8+ Kc7 59.Rg7+ Rd7 60.Rg5 b3 61.Rxc5+ Kb8 0–1

=== Game 29: Korchnoi–Karpov, 1–0 ===
7 and 8 October. Match score: Karpov leads 5–4 with 20 draws.

English Opening, Mikenas–Carls, Sicilian Variation
1.c4 Nf6 2.Nc3 e6 3.e4 c5 4.e5 Ng8 5.d4 cxd4 6.Qxd4 Nc6 7.Qe4 d6 8.Nf3 dxe5 9.Nxe5 Nf6 10.Nxc6 Qb6 11.Qf3 bxc6 12.Be2 Bb7 13.0-0 c5 14.Qh3 Be7 15.Bf3 0-0 16.b3 Rfd8 17.Be3 Bc6 18.Na4 Qc7 19.Bxc6 Qxc6 20.Rad1 Rac8 21.Qg3 Bd6 22.Qh4 Be7 23.f3 Kf8 24.Qf2 Rxd1 25.Rxd1 Qc7 26.Qg3 Qxg3 27.hxg3 h5 28.Kf2 Ke8 29.Ke2 g6 30.Nc3 a6 31.Na4 Rc6 32.Rh1 Bd6 33.Bf2 Nd7 34.g4 hxg4 35.Rh8+ Ke7 36.fxg4 g5 37.Be3 f6 38.Nc3 Kf7 39.Rh7+ Ke8 40.Ne4 Be7 41.Rh6 Kf7 42.Rh7+ Kf8 43.Rh8+ Kf7 44.Bd2 Nf8 45.Rh1 Kg6 46.Rd1 f5 47.Nf2 Bd6 48.Bc3 Nd7 49.gxf5+ exf5 50.g4 Nb6 51.Kf3 Be7 52.Ba5 Rf6 53.Kg2 fxg4 54.Nxg4 Re6 55.Kf3 Bf6 56.Nxf6 Rxf6+ 57.Kg4 Nc8 58.Bd8 Rf4+ 59.Kg3 Rf5 60.a4 Kf7 61.Rd3 Re5 62.Kg4 Kg6 63.a5 Re4+ 64.Kf3 Rf4+ 65.Ke3 Rh4 66.Rd5 Rh3+ 67.Kd2 Rxb3 68.Rxc5 Rb8 69.Rc6+ Kf5 70.Rxa6 g4 71.Rf6+ Ke4 72.Bc7 Rb2+ 73.Kc3 Rb7 74.Bh2 Rh7 75.Bb8 Rb7 76.Bg3 Rb1 77.Rf4+ Ke3 78.Rf8 Ne7 79.a6 1–0

=== Game 30: Karpov–Korchnoi, ½–½ ===
10 October. Match score: Karpov leads 5–4 with 21 draws.

English Opening
1.c4 Nf6 2.Nc3 d5 3.cxd5 Nxd5 4.g3 g6 5.Bg2 Nxc3 6.bxc3 Bg7 7.Nf3 0-0 8.0-0 c5 9.Rb1 Nc6 10.Qa4 Na5 11.d3 b6 12.Qh4 Bb7 13.Bh6 Bxh6 14.Qxh6 Bxf3 15.Bxf3 Rc8 16.Bg2 Qd7 17.Rbe1 b5 18.Rb1 Rb8 19.Qe3 Qd6 20.Rfd1 a6 21.Rd2 Rfc8 22.Rdb2 Nc6 23.Qd2 Ne5 24.Qf4 Nd7 25.Qxd6 exd6 26.Bh3 Rd8 27.a4 bxa4 28.Bxd7 Rxb2 29.Rxb2 Rxd7 30.Ra2 Kf8 31.Rxa4 Ra7 32.Kf1 Ke8 33.Ke1 Kd7 34.Kd2 h5 35.Kc2 Ra8 36.Rf4 Ke6 37.h4 Rb8 38.Re4+ Kd7 39.Ra4 Ra8 40.Rf4 Ke6 41.Rc4 Ra7 ½–½

=== Game 31: Korchnoi–Karpov, 1–0 ===
12 and 13 October. Match score: tied 5–5 with 21 draws.

Queen's Gambit Declined
1.c4 e6 2.Nc3 d5 3.d4 Nf6 4.cxd5 exd5 5.Bg5 Be7 6.e3 0-0 7.Bd3 Nbd7 8.Nf3 Re8 9.Qc2 c6 10.0-0 Nf8 11.Bxf6 Bxf6 12.b4 Bg4 13.Nd2 Rc8 14.Bf5 Bxf5 15.Qxf5 Qd7 16.Qxd7 Nxd7 17.a4 Be7 18.Rfb1 Nf6 19.a5 a6 20.Na4 Bf8 21.Nc5 Re7 22.Kf1 Ne8 23.Ke2 Nd6 24.Kd3 Rce8 25.Re1 g6 26.Re2 f6 27.Rae1 Bh6 28.Ndb3 Bf8 29.Nd2 Bh6 30.h3 Kf7 31.g4 Bf8 32.f3 Rd8 33.Ndb3 Nb5 34.Rf1 Bh6 35.f4 Bf8 36.Nd2 Nd6 37.Rfe1 h6 38.Rf1 Rb8 39.Ra1 Rbe8 40.Rae1 Rb8 41.e4 dxe4+ 42.Ndxe4 Nb5 43.Nc3 Rxe2 44.Rxe2 Bxc5 45.bxc5 Rd8 46.Nxb5 axb5 47.f5 gxf5 48.gxf5 Rg8 49.Kc3 Re8 50.Rd2 Re4 51.Kb4 Ke8 52.a6 bxa6 53.Ka5 Kd7 54.Kb6 b4 55.d5 cxd5 56.Rxd5+ Kc8 57.Rd3 a5 58.Rg3 b3 59.Kc6 Kb8 60.Rxb3+ Ka7 61.Rb7+ Ka6 62.Rb6+ Ka7 63.Kb5 a4 64.Rxf6 Rf4 65.Rxh6 a3 66.Ra6+ Kb8 67.Rxa3 Rxf5 68.Rg3 Rf6 69.Rg8+ Kc7 70.Rg7+ Kc8 71.Rh7 1–0

=== Game 32: Karpov–Korchnoi, 1–0 ===
17 and 18 October. Match score: Karpov wins the championship 6–5 with 21 draws.

Pirc Defense
1.e4 d6 2.d4 Nf6 3.Nc3 g6 4.Nf3 Bg7 5.Be2 0-0 6.0-0 c5 7.d5 Na6 8.Bf4 Nc7 9.a4 b6 10.Re1 Bb7 11.Bc4 Nh5 12.Bg5 Nf6 13.Qd3 a6 14.Rad1 Rb8 15.h3 Nd7 16.Qe3 Ba8 17.Bh6 b5 18.Bxg7 Kxg7 19.Bf1 Nf6 20.axb5 axb5 21.Ne2 Bb7 22.Ng3 Ra8 23.c3 Ra4 24.Bd3 Qa8 25.e5 dxe5 26.Qxe5 Ncxd5 27.Bxb5 Ra7 28.Nh4 Bc8 29.Be2 Be6 30.c4 Nb4 31.Qxc5 Qb8 32.Bf1 Rc8 33.Qg5 Kh8 34.Rd2 Nc6 35.Qh6 Rg8 36.Nf3 Qf8 37.Qe3 Kg7 38.Ng5 Bd7 39.b4 Qa8 40.b5 Na5 41.b6 Rb7 1–0
