= Baguio Convention and Cultural Center =

Convention center in Baguio, Philippines

- The convention center in 2018
- Interactive map of Baguio Convention and Cultural Center
- Former names: Baguio Convention Center
- Coordinates: 16.4044°N 120.5998°E
- Owner: Baguio city government
- Operator: Baguio city government

The Baguio Convention and Cultural Center (BCCC), commonly known as the Baguio Convention Center, is a convention center in Baguio, Philippines.

== History ==
The facility initially known as the Baguio Convention Center (BCC) was built by then-First Lady Imelda Marcos. It was designed with an Igorot motif in 1977 under the Ministry of Human Settlements which was under Marcos.

The land used to build the convention center was owned by the Philippine national government. Imelda's husband and President Ferdinand Marcos issued Presidential Decree No. 396 on February 27, 1974 to transfer the land to the Government Service Insurance System (GSIS) on the condition a convention center will be built.

The inauguration was marked by the hosting of the World Chess Championship 1978 which featured the match between then-Soviets Anatoly Karpov and Viktor Korchnoi. It opened with the seating capacity of 1,000 people. It was widely believed that the administration of President Ferdinand Marcos built the Baguio Convention Center specifically for the chess tournament.

Interior in 2025

The Baguio city government acquired the property from the GSIS for ₱250 million in 2003 to be paid in installment. The Baguio government entered into an agreement with the Bases Conversion and Development Authority (BCDA) was to pay its obligations to the city to the GSIS instead. However due to BCDA's own dispute with Camp John Hay's developers, it cannot remit payments and the GSIS attempted to repossess the convention center. The dispute was resolved by 2012.

Sometime after Baguio's recognition as a creative hub by UNESCO, the convention center adopted its current name.

== Facilities ==
The BCCC's hall has a total capacity of 2,000 people.
