= 1955 USSR Chess Championship =

Soviet chess tournament

22nd Soviet Chess Championship (1955)
- Location: Moscow

Champion
- Efim Geller

The 1955 Soviet Chess Championship was the 22nd edition of USSR Chess Championship. Held from 11 February to 15 March 1955 in Moscow. The tournament was won by Efim Geller who defeats Smyslov in a play-off match (4-3). The final were preceded semifinals events at Leningrad, Gorky and Yerevan. It was the worst USSR Chess Championship of Korchnoi's career, despite having fought in each game, all showing the high level of the competition.

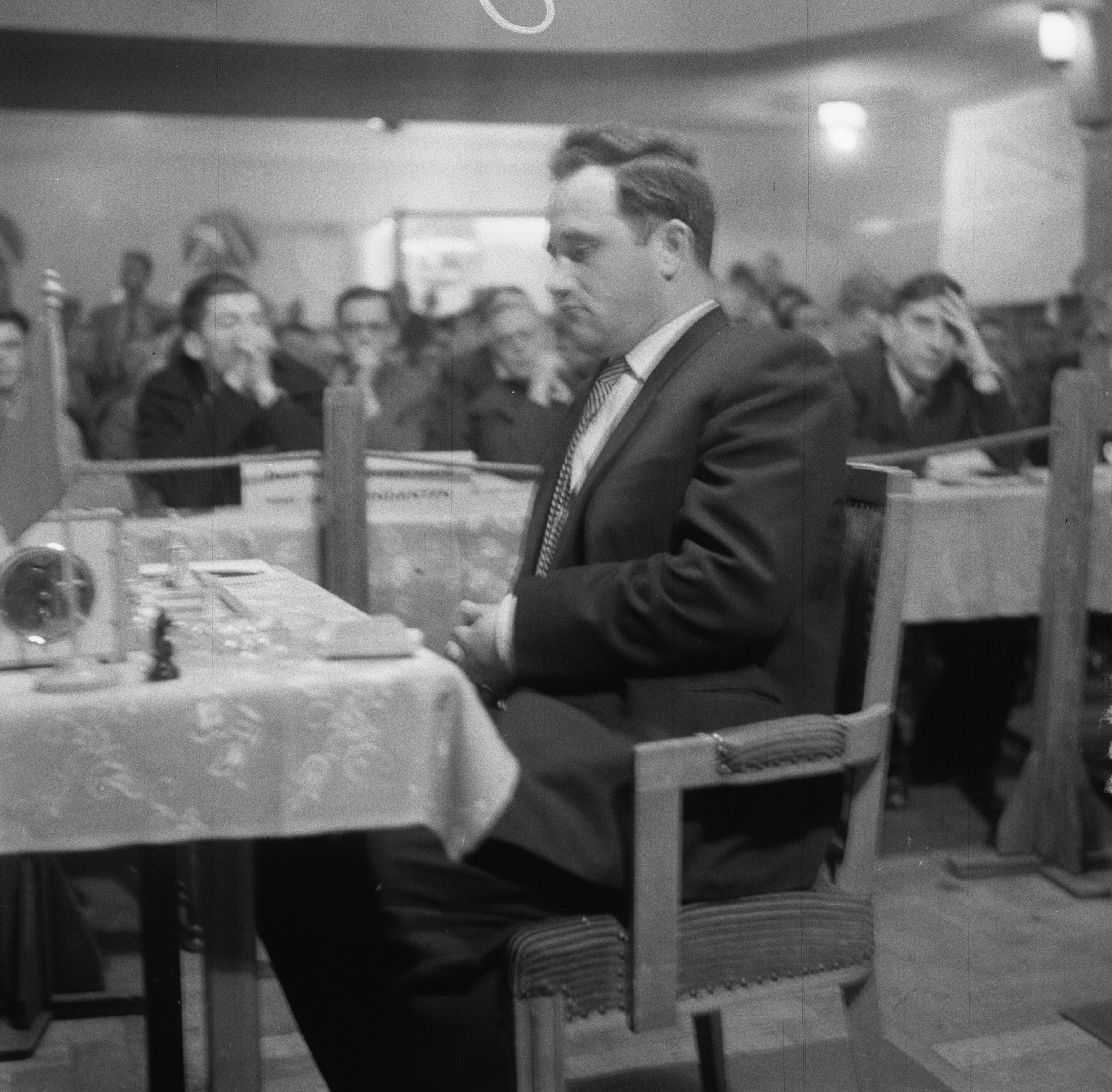
Efim Geller

== Table and results ==
22nd Soviet Chess Championship (1955)
| | Player | 1 | 2 | 3 | 4 | 5 | 6 | 7 | 8 | 9 | 10 | 11 | 12 | 13 | 14 | 15 | 16 | 17 | 18 | 19 | 20 | Total |
|---|---|---|---|---|---|---|---|---|---|---|---|---|---|---|---|---|---|---|---|---|---|---|
| 1 | (Soviet Union) Efim Geller | - | 0 | 1 | 0 | ½ | ½ | ½ | 0 | 1 | 0 | 1 | 1 | 0 | 1 | 1 | ½ | 1 | 1 | 1 | 1 | 12 |
| 2 | (Soviet Union) Vasily Smyslov | 1 | - | 1 | ½ | 0 | ½ | 1 | ½ | 1 | ½ | ½ | ½ | 1 | ½ | 0 | ½ | 1 | ½ | ½ | 1 | 12 |
| 3 | (Soviet Union) Mikhail Botvinnik | 0 | 0 | - | ½ | ½ | ½ | 0 | ½ | ½ | 1 | 1 | 1 | ½ | ½ | ½ | 1 | 1 | ½ | 1 | 1 | 11½ |
| 4 | (Soviet Union) Boris Spassky | 1 | ½ | ½ | - | ½ | ½ | ½ | 1 | ½ | 1 | 0 | 0 | 0 | ½ | ½ | 1 | ½ | 1 | 1 | 1 | 11½ |
| 5 | (Soviet Union) Georgy Ilivitsky | ½ | 1 | ½ | ½ | - | ½ | 1 | 0 | ½ | ½ | 1 | ½ | ½ | ½ | ½ | ½ | ½ | 1 | ½ | 1 | 11½ |
| 6 | (Soviet Union) Tigran Petrosian | ½ | ½ | ½ | ½ | ½ | - | ½ | 1 | ½ | ½ | ½ | ½ | ½ | ½ | ½ | ½ | 1 | 1 | ½ | 1 | 11½ |
| 7 | (Soviet Union) Paul Keres | ½ | 0 | 1 | ½ | 0 | ½ | - | 1 | 0 | ½ | 0 | ½ | 1 | ½ | 1 | ½ | 1 | 1 | ½ | 1 | 11 |
| 8 | (Soviet Union) Mark Taimanov | 1 | ½ | ½ | 0 | 1 | 0 | 0 | - | 1 | 1 | ½ | 1 | ½ | ½ | 1 | ½ | 0 | 1 | ½ | ½ | 11 |
| 9 | (Soviet Union) Vladas Mikenas | 0 | 0 | ½ | ½ | ½ | ½ | 1 | 0 | - | ½ | ½ | 1 | 0 | ½ | 1 | ½ | 1 | 1 | ½ | 1 | 10½ |
| 10 | (Soviet Union) Vladimir Antoshin | 1 | ½ | 0 | 0 | ½ | ½ | ½ | 0 | ½ | - | 1 | 0 | 1 | ½ | 0 | ½ | 1 | 1 | ½ | 1 | 10 |
| 11 | (Soviet Union) Semyon Furman | 0 | ½ | 0 | 1 | 0 | ½ | 1 | ½ | ½ | 0 | - | 1 | ½ | 1 | ½ | ½ | 0 | 1 | ½ | 1 | 10 |
| 12 | (Soviet Union) Alexander Kotov | 0 | ½ | 0 | 1 | ½ | ½ | ½ | 0 | 0 | 1 | 0 | - | 1 | ½ | 1 | 0 | 1 | ½ | 1 | ½ | 9½ |
| 13 | (Soviet Union) Georgy Borisenko | 1 | 0 | ½ | 1 | ½ | ½ | 0 | ½ | 1 | 0 | ½ | 0 | - | ½ | ½ | ½ | ½ | 0 | ½ | 1 | 9 |
| 14 | (Soviet Union) Salo Flohr | 0 | ½ | ½ | ½ | ½ | ½ | ½ | ½ | ½ | ½ | 0 | ½ | ½ | - | ½ | 1 | 0 | ½ | 1 | ½ | 9 |
| 15 | (Soviet Union) Georgy Lisitsin | 0 | 1 | ½ | ½ | ½ | ½ | 0 | 0 | 0 | 1 | ½ | 0 | ½ | ½ | - | ½ | ½ | 0 | 1 | 1 | 8½ |
| 16 | (Soviet Union) Yuri Averbakh | ½ | ½ | 0 | 0 | ½ | ½ | ½ | ½ | ½ | ½ | ½ | 1 | ½ | 0 | ½ | - | ½ | ½ | ½ | ½ | 8½ |
| 17 | (Soviet Union) Ilya Kan | 0 | 0 | 0 | ½ | ½ | 0 | 0 | 1 | 0 | 0 | 1 | 0 | ½ | 1 | ½ | ½ | - | 0 | 1 | ½ | 7 |
| 18 | (Soviet Union) Vladimir Simagin | 0 | ½ | ½ | 0 | 0 | 0 | 0 | 0 | 0 | 0 | 0 | ½ | 1 | ½ | 1 | ½ | 1 | - | 1 | 0 | 6½ |
| 19 | (Soviet Union) Viktor Korchnoi | 0 | ½ | 0 | 0 | ½ | ½ | ½ | ½ | ½ | ½ | ½ | 0 | ½ | 0 | 0 | ½ | 0 | 0 | - | 1 | 6 |
| 20 | (Soviet Union) Vitaly Shcherbakov | 0 | 0 | 0 | 0 | 0 | 0 | 0 | ½ | 0 | 0 | 0 | ½ | 0 | ½ | 0 | ½ | ½ | 1 | 0 | - | 3½ |

=== Play-off match ===
Moscow, April 1955
| Player | 1 | 2 | 3 | 4 | 5 | 6 | 7 | Total |
|---|---|---|---|---|---|---|---|---|
| (Soviet Union) Efim Geller | ½ | ½ | ½ | ½ | ½ | ½ | 1 | 4 |
| (Soviet Union) Vasily Smyslov | ½ | ½ | ½ | ½ | ½ | ½ | 0 | 3 |
