= Georgy Ilivitsky =

Soviet chess player

Georgy Ilivitsky (30 April 1921 – 28 November 1989) was a Soviet chess master. He is best known for reaching the 1955 Interzonal Tournament.

Ilivitsky was an engineer and scored a surprise result by coming in 3rd–6th in the 1955 USSR Chess Championship. The championship was extremely strong: the joint winners were Vasily Smyslov (World Champion 1957–58) and Efim Geller; while equal with Ilivitsky were World Champion Mikhail Botvinnik, and future World Champions Tigran Petrosian and Boris Spassky. The result qualified Ilivitsky for the 1955 Interzonal Tournament, where he came 10th-equal and narrowly missed qualifying for the Candidates Tournament.

On November 28th, 1989, Ilivitsky (who was suffering from poverty and severe health problems) took his own life.
