= World Chess Championship 1957 =

	Defending champion	Challenger
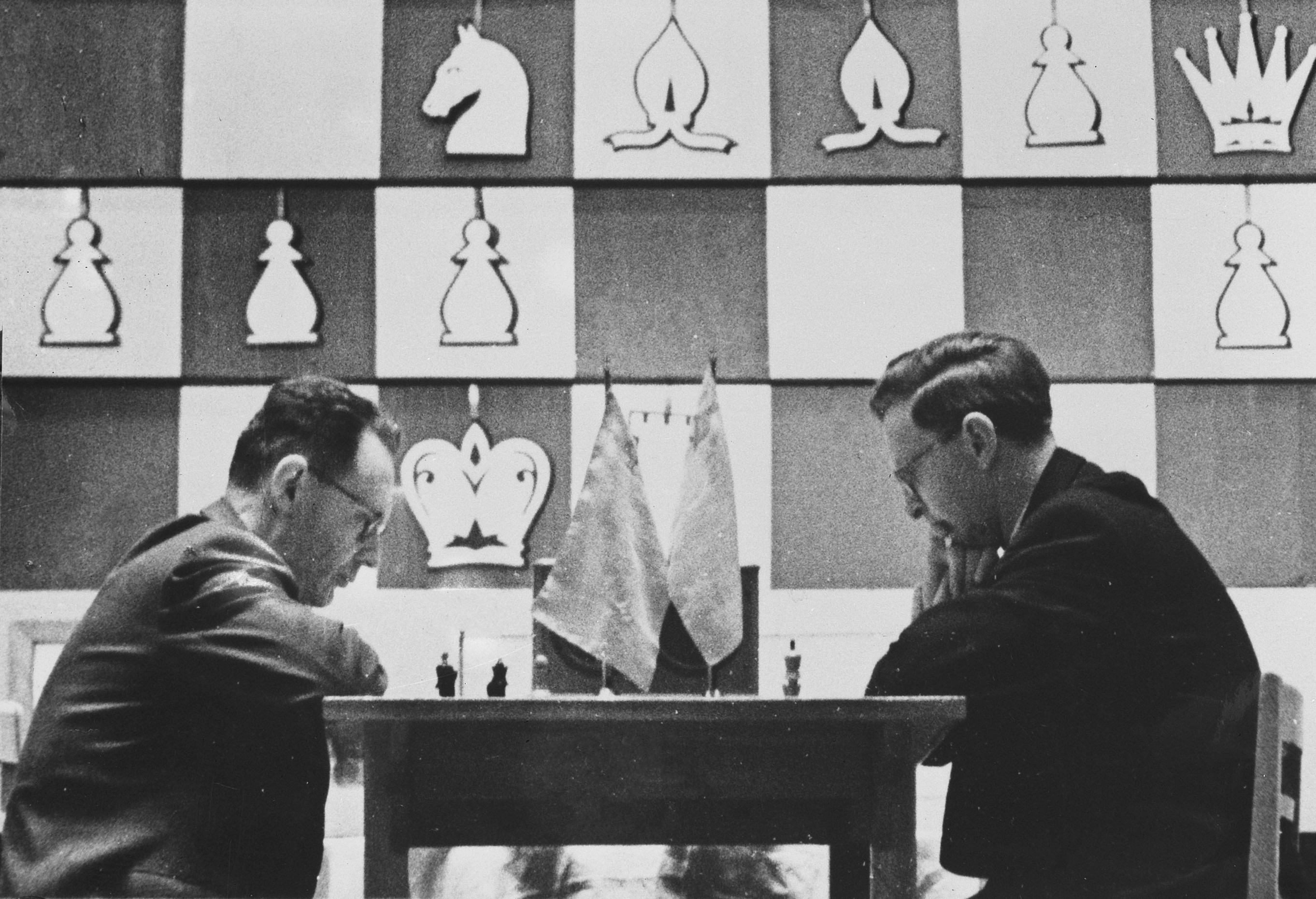
	(Soviet Union) Mikhail Botvinnik	(Soviet Union) Vasily Smyslov
9½	Scores	12½
	Born 17 August 1911; 45 years old	Born 24 March 1921; 35/36 years old
	Winner of the 1954 World Chess Championship	Winner of the 1956 Candidates Tournament

A World Chess Championship was played between Mikhail Botvinnik and Vasily Smyslov in Moscow from March 5 to April 27, 1957. Botvinnik had been World Champion since 1948, while Smyslov earned the right to challenge by winning the 1956 Candidates tournament. This was the second World Championship match between the pair, after the drawn 1954 match.

Smyslov won the match and became the seventh World Chess Champion. He lost the title, however, in the 1958 rematch.

== 1955 Interzonal tournament ==
An interzonal tournament was held in Gothenburg, Sweden, in August and September 1955. The top nine finishers qualified for the Candidates Tournament.

1955 Interzonal Tournament
		1	2	3	4	5	6	7	8	9	10	11	12	13	14	15	16	17	18	19	20	21	Total	Tie break
1	David Bronstein (Soviet Union)	x	1	1	½	1	½	½	½	½	½	½	½	½	½	1	1	1	1	1	1	1	15	
2	Paul Keres (Soviet Union)	0	x	1	½	½	½	½	½	1	½	1	1	1	½	1	1	0	1	½	½	1	13½	
3	Oscar Panno (Argentina)	0	0	x	½	0	1	½	½	1	½	1	1	1	½	½	1	½	1	1	1	½	13	
4	Tigran Petrosian (Soviet Union)	½	½	½	x	½	½	½	½	½	½	½	½	1	½	½	½	1	½	1	1	1	12½	
5	Efim Geller (Soviet Union)	0	½	1	½	x	½	½	1	½	0	½	½	½	0	1	½	1	1	1	½	1	12	111.75
6	László Szabó (Hungary)	½	½	0	½	½	x	½	½	½	½	½	0	½	½	1	½	1	1	1	1	1	12	108.50
7	Miroslav Filip (Czechoslovakia)	½	½	½	½	½	½	x	½	0	½	½	½	1	½	0	1	½	½	½	1	1	11	104.00
8	Hermann Pilnik (Argentina)	½	½	½	½	0	½	½	x	0	½	½	½	½	1	1	½	½	½	½	1	1	11	102.50
9	Boris Spassky (Soviet Union)	½	0	0	½	½	½	1	1	x	1	0	0	½	1	½	½	1	0	1	1	½	11	102.50
10	Georgy Ilivitsky (Soviet Union)	½	½	½	½	1	½	½	½	0	x	½	0	0	½	½	1	½	½	1	½	1	10½	100.50
11	Luděk Pachman (Czechoslovakia)	½	0	0	½	½	½	½	½	1	½	x	½	½	½	1	½	½	½	1	½	½	10½	99.25
12	Miguel Najdorf (Argentina)	½	0	0	½	½	1	½	½	1	1	½	x	0	0	0	½	½	1	½	1	0	9½	94.00
13	Carlos Guimard (Argentina)	½	0	0	0	½	½	0	½	½	1	½	½	x	½	1	0	1	½	0	½	1	9½	89.50
14	Braslav Rabar (Yugoslavia)	½	½	½	½	1	½	½	0	0	½	½	1	½	x	½	½	½	0	0	1	0	9	93.50
15	Andrija Fuderer (Yugoslavia)	0	0	½	½	0	0	1	0	½	½	0	1	0	½	x	1	1	1	1	0	½	9	81.25
16	Wolfgang Unzicker (West Germany)	0	0	0	½	½	½	0	½	½	0	½	½	1	½	0	x	½	½	½	1	1	8½	
17	Gideon Ståhlberg (Sweden)	0	1	½	0	0	0	½	½	0	½	½	½	0	½	0	½	x	1	½	½	1	8	74.00
18	Arthur Bisguier (United States)	0	0	0	½	0	0	½	½	1	½	½	0	½	1	0	½	0	x	½	1	1	8	70.50
19	Antonio Medina (Spain)	0	½	0	0	0	0	½	½	0	0	0	½	1	1	0	½	½	½	x	0	0	5½	53.25
20	Jan Hein Donner (Netherlands)	0	½	0	0	½	0	0	0	0	½	½	0	½	0	1	0	½	0	1	x	½	5½	49.25
21	Bogdan Śliwa (Poland)	0	0	½	0	0	0	0	0	½	0	½	1	0	1	½	0	0	0	1	½	x	5½	48.50

Ilivitsky won a 6-game match against Pachman (1–0 with 5 draws) to qualify as first reserve for the Candidates.

== 1956 Candidates tournament ==
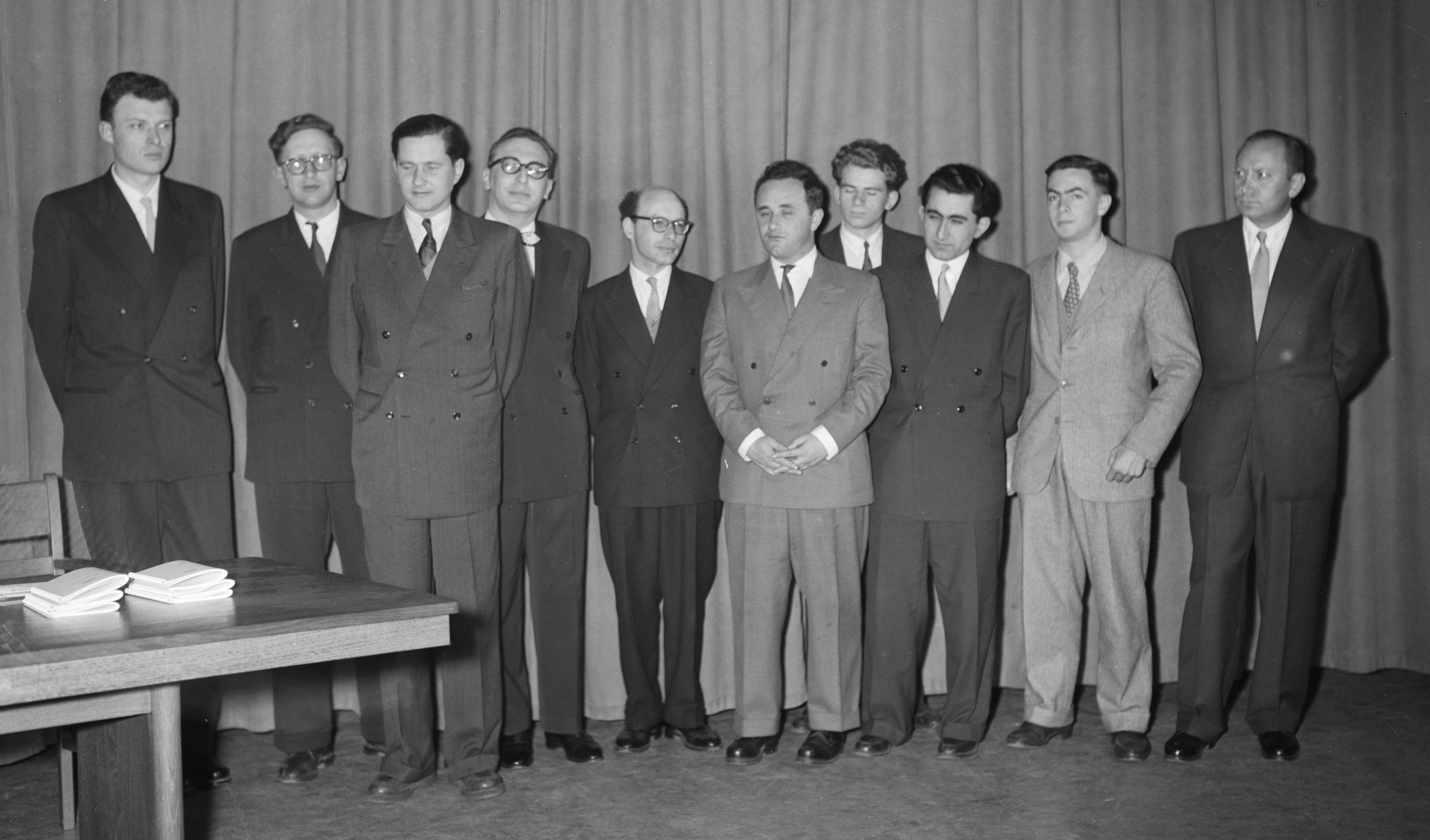
The 1956 Candidates tournament, Amsterdam From left: Filip, Smyslov, Keres, Pilnik, Bronstein, Geller, Spassky, Petrosian, Panno, Szabó

The 1956 Candidates tournament was held in Amsterdam in the Netherlands in April and May. As the loser of the last championship match, Smyslov was seeded directly into the tournament and joined by the top nine from the Interzonal. Smyslov won, once again becoming the challenger in the 1957 championship match.

With two rounds remaining, the leaders were Smyslov 10, Keres 9½, Geller 9. In the penultimate round, Keres lost in a winning position against Filip, while Smyslov and Geller drew their games, giving Smyslov a full point lead (Smyslov 10½, Keres 9½, Geller 9½). Smyslov also won his final game, against Pilnik, to ensure victory.

1956 Candidates Tournament
		1	2	3	4	5	6	7	8	9	10	Score
1	Vasily Smyslov (Soviet Union)	xx	= =	= =	0 =	= =	= 1	1 1	= 1	1 =	= 1	11½
2	Paul Keres (Soviet Union)	= =	xx	= =	= =	= =	= 1	= =	= 0	1 =	1 =	10
3–7	László Szabó (Hungary)	= =	= =	xx	1 =	= =	= =	= 1	0 =	= =	0 1	9½
3–7	Boris Spassky (Soviet Union)	1 =	= =	0 =	xx	= =	= 1	0 =	= =	= =	= 1	9½
3–7	Tigran Petrosian (Soviet Union)	= =	= =	= =	= =	xx	0 =	0 1	1 =	= =	1 =	9½
3–7	David Bronstein (Soviet Union)	= 0	= 0	= =	= 0	1 =	xx	= 1	1 =	= =	= 1	9½
3–7	Efim Geller (Soviet Union)	0 0	= =	= 0	1 =	1 0	= 0	xx	1 1	= 1	1 =	9½
8–9	Miroslav Filip (Czechoslovakia)	= 0	= 1	1 =	= =	0 =	0 =	0 0	xx	1 0	= 1	8
8–9	Oscar Panno (Argentina)	0 =	0 =	= =	= =	= =	= =	= 0	0 1	xx	1 =	8
10	Hermann Pilnik (Argentina)	= 0	0 =	1 0	= 0	0 =	= 0	0 =	= 0	0 =	xx	5

== 1957 Championship match ==
The match was played as best of 24 games. If it ended 12–12, Botvinnik, the holder, would retain the Championship. Smyslov won.

World Chess Championship Match 1957
	1	2	3	4	5	6	7	8	9	10	11	12	13	14	15	16	17	18	19	20	21	22	Points
Vasily Smyslov (Soviet Union)	1	½	½	0	0	1	½	1	½	½	½	1	0	½	½	½	1	½	½	1	½	½	12½
Mikhail Botvinnik (Soviet Union)	0	½	½	1	1	0	½	0	½	½	½	0	1	½	½	½	0	½	½	0	½	½	9½

== Games ==
=== Game 1: Botvinnik–Smyslov, 0–1 ===
English (ECO A16)
1.c4 Nf6 2.Nc3 g6 3.g3 Bg7 4.Bg2 0-0 5.e4 c5 6.Nge2 Nc6 7.0-0 d6 8.a3 Bd7 9.h3 Ne8 10.d3 Nc7 11.Rb1 Rb8 12.Be3 b5 13.cxb5 Nxb5 14.Nxb5 Rxb5 15.d4 Qc8 16.dxc5 dxc5 17.Kh2 Rd8 18.Qc1 Nd4 19.Nc3 Rb7 20.f4 Bc6 21.Rf2 a5 22.Qf1 Nb5 23.e5 Nxc3 24.bxc3 Bxg2 25.Rxg2 Rxb1 26.Qxb1 Qc6 27.Rd2 Rxd2+ 28.Bxd2 c4 29.Be3 f6 30.Bd4 Kf7 31.Qd1 a4 32.Qe2 Qd5 33.Kg1 Bf8 34.f5 fxe5 35.fxg6+ hxg6 36.Bxe5 e6 37.Qf2+ Ke8 38.Qf6 Bxa3 39.Qxg6+ Kd7 40.Qh7+ Be7 41.Bf6 0–1

=== Game 2: Smyslov–Botvinnik, ½–½ ===
Sicilian, Richter–Rauzer (ECO B62)
1.e4 c5 2.Nf3 Nc6 3.d4 cxd4 4.Nxd4 Nf6 5.Nc3 d6 6.Bg5 e6 7.Qd2 a6 8.0-0-0 h6 9.Be3 Ng4 10.Nxc6 bxc6 11.Bc5 Bb7 12.h3 dxc5 13.Qxd8+ Rxd8 14.Rxd8+ Kxd8 15.hxg4 Bd6 16.Na4 Kc7 17.Bc4 Rd8 18.b3 Bc8 19.Re1 f6 20.Nb2 Bf4+ 21.Kb1 Bd2 22.Rf1 Bf4 23.Nd3 Bd6 24.Kc1 a5 25.a4 Be7 26.Re1 Bd6 27.e5 Bxe5 28.Nxe5 fxe5 29.Rxe5 Kd6 30.Re3 Rf8 31.f3 e5 32.Kd2 Rf4 33.g3 Rf8 34.Rd3+ Kc7 35.Re3 Kd6 36.Be2 Be6 37.Rd3+ Kc7 38.Rc3 Kd6 39.Ke3 Bd5 40.Rd3 Kc7 41.Rd1 Rf6 42.Rh1 Kd6 43.c4 Bf7 44.Bd3 Ke7 45.Be4 Rd6 ½–½

=== Game 3: Botvinnik–Smyslov, ½–½ ===
King's Indian, Fianchetto, Panno Variation (ECO E63)
1.c4 Nf6 2.Nc3 g6 3.g3 Bg7 4.Bg2 0-0 5.d4 d6 6.Nf3 Nc6 7.0-0 a6 8.d5 Na5 9.Nd2 c5 10.Qc2 e5 11.a3 b6 12.b4 Nb7 13.Rb1 Bd7 14.Nde4 Nxe4 15.Nxe4 Qc7 16.bxc5 Nxc5 17.Nxc5 bxc5 18.Bd2 Rfb8 19.e4 Rxb1 20.Rxb1 Rb8 21.Rb3 Rxb3 22.Qxb3 Bf6 23.h4 Bd8 24.Kh2 Qb6 25.Qc2 h5 26.Bh3 Be8 27.Bc3 Qb7 28.Kg2 Kh7 29.Kf1 a5 30.a4 Qa6 31.Qb3 Qb6 32.Qa2 Qb7 33.Kg1 Kg8 34.Kh1 Kh7 35.Kg2 Kg8 36.Qc2 Kh7 37.Bd2 Bf6 38.Kh2 Qb6 39.Bc3 Bg7 40.Bc8 Bh6 41.Kg2 ½–½

=== Game 4: Smyslov–Botvinnik, 0–1 ===
Sicilian, Richter-Rauzer (ECO B62)
1.e4 c5 2.Nf3 Nc6 3.d4 cxd4 4.Nxd4 Nf6 5.Nc3 d6 6.Bg5 e6 7.Qd2 a6 8.0-0-0 h6 9.Be3 Bd7 10.f3 b5 11.Nxc6 Bxc6 12.Qf2 Qc7 13.Bd3 Be7 14.Qg3 g6 15.Kb1 0-0-0 16.Qf2 Kb7 17.Ne2 e5 18.Nc1 d5 19.exd5 Nxd5 20.Rhe1 f5 21.Nb3 Nxe3 22.Qxe3 Bd6 23.c4 bxc4 24.Bxc4 Qb6 25.Qe2 Ka7 26.Rc1 Bb7 27.Red1 e4 28.Bd5 Bf4 29.Bxb7 Bxc1 30.Bd5 Be3+ 31.fxe4 fxe4 32.Qc4 Rh7 33.Qxe4 Rhd7 34.Rd3 Bg5 35.Qf3 Rxd5 36.Rxd5 Qg1+ 37.Kc2 Rc8+ 38.Kd3 Qb1+ 39.Kd4 Qxb2+ 40.Ke4 Re8+ 41.Kd3 0–1

=== Game 5: Botvinnik–Smyslov, 1–0 ===
English (ECO A16)
1.c4 Nf6 2.Nc3 g6 3.g3 Bg7 4.Bg2 0-0 5.d4 d6 6.Nf3 Bg4 7.h3 Bxf3 8.Bxf3 Nc6 9.Bg2 Nd7 10.e3 e5 11.d5 Ne7 12.e4 f5 13.h4 f4 14.Bh3 Rf6 15.Qe2 Bh6 16.Bd2 Nc5 17.b4 f3 18.Qf1 Bxd2+ 19.Kxd2 Na6 20.a3 c6 21.Qd3 Nc7 22.Rab1 Rb8 23.Rhc1 a5 24.b5 c5 25.b6 Ne8 26.Re1 Ng7 27.Re3 Qf8 28.Rb5 Ra8 29.Na4 Qf7 30.Qc3 h5 31.Rxa5 Rb8 32.Nb2 Kh7 33.Qb3 Ng8 34.Nd3 Nh6 35.Re1 Ng4 36.Qa4 Qe7 37.Kc2 Rff8 38.Ra7 Ne8 39.Bxg4 hxg4 40.Qb5 Nf6 41.a4 Kg8 42.Qa5 Qd8 43.Nb2 Nd7 44.Nd1 Nf6 45.Qb5 Qe7 46.a5 Qh7 47.Kd3 Rf7 48.Qb2 Nh5 49.Rg1 g5 50.hxg5 Rbf8 51.Qd2 Rf4 52.Nc3 Nxg3 53.Rxg3 Qh2 54.Qe1 1–0

=== Game 6: Smyslov–Botvinnik, 1–0 ===
Grünfeld, Russian (ECO D98)
1.d4 Nf6 2.c4 g6 3.Nc3 d5 4.Nf3 Bg7 5.Qb3 dxc4 6.Qxc4 0-0 7.e4 Bg4 8.Be3 Nfd7 9.0-0-0 Nc6 10.h3 Bxf3 11.gxf3 Nb6 12.Qc5 f5 13.Ne2 Qd6 14.e5 Qxc5+ 15.dxc5 Nc4 16.f4 Rfd8 17.Bg2 Nxe3 18.fxe3 Nb4 19.Bxb7 Rab8 20.c6 Kf7 21.Nd4 e6 22.Nb5 Nd5 23.Rxd5 exd5 24.Nxc7 Rdc8 25.Bxc8 Rxc8 26.Nxd5 Rxc6+ 27.Kd2 Ke6 28.Nc3 1–0

=== Game 7: Botvinnik–Smyslov, ½–½ ===
Nimzo-Indian (ECO E45)
1.c4 Nf6 2.Nc3 e6 3.d4 Bb4 4.e3 b6 5.Ne2 Ba6 6.a3 Bxc3+ 7.Nxc3 d5 8.b3 0-0 9.Be2 dxc4 10.bxc4 Nc6 11.Nb5 Na5 12.Bd2 c6 13.Bxa5 bxa5 14.Nc3 c5 15.Na4 cxd4 16.exd4 Qd6 17.0-0 Rad8 18.Qd2 Qxd4 19.Qxa5 Qe4 20.Nc3 Qc6 21.Nb5 Qb6 22.Qxb6 axb6 23.Rfd1 Ne4 ½–½

=== Game 8: Smyslov–Botvinnik, 1–0 ===
Sicilian, Richter–Rauzer (ECO B62)
1.e4 c5 2.Nf3 Nc6 3.d4 cxd4 4.Nxd4 Nf6 5.Nc3 d6 6.Bg5 e6 7.Qd2 a6 8.0-0-0 h6 9.Be3 Bd7 10.f4 Rc8 11.Kb1 b5 12.Bd3 Ng4 13.Bg1 Nxd4 14.Bxd4 e5 15.Bg1 exf4 16.Nd5 Ne3 17.Bxe3 fxe3 18.Qxe3 Be6 19.Qa7 Bxd5 20.exd5 Be7 21.Rhe1 Qc7 22.Qxa6 0-0 23.c3 Bf6 24.Bxb5 Ra8 25.Qc6 Qb8 26.Qc4 Rc8 27.Bc6 Ra7 28.Qb3 Qc7 29.Re4 g6 30.Rf1 Be5 31.h3 Kg7 32.Rb4 Rf8 33.a3 h5 34.Ka2 Qd8 35.Qc2 f5 36.Qf2 Raf7 37.a4 g5 38.Rb5 g4 39.a5 f4 40.hxg4 hxg4 41.a6 1–0

=== Game 9: Botvinnik–Smyslov, ½–½ ===
King's Indian, Fianchetto (ECO E62)
1.c4 Nf6 2.Nc3 g6 3.g3 Bg7 4.Bg2 0-0 5.d4 d6 6.Nf3 c6 7.0-0 Bf5 8.Nh4 Be6 9.d5 cxd5 10.cxd5 Bd7 11.Be3 Na6 12.Bd4 Qa5 13.Re1 Nc5 14.e4 Na4 15.Nxa4 Qxa4 16.b3 Qa3 17.f4 Bb5 18.e5 Nd7 19.e6 Bxd4+ 20.Qxd4 Qc5 21.Nf3 fxe6 22.dxe6 Nf6 23.Rac1 Qh5 24.Ng5 Bc6 25.Bxc6 bxc6 26.Rxc6 Ng4 27.h4 h6 28.Nf7 Kh7 29.b4 Rac8 30.Rxc8 Rxc8 31.Nxd6 exd6 32.Qxa7+ Kh8 33.Qd7 Rc3 34.Qd8+ Kh7 35.Qd7+ Kh8 36.Qd8+ Kh7 37.Qd7+ Kh8 38.Qe8+ Kh7 39.Qe7+ Kh8 40.Qe8+ Kh7 ½–½

=== Game 10: Smyslov–Botvinnik, ½–½ ===
Ruy Lopez, Closed, Chigorin (ECO C98)
1.e4 e5 2.Nf3 Nc6 3.Bb5 a6 4.Ba4 Nf6 5.0-0 Be7 6.Re1 b5 7.Bb3 0-0 8.c3 d6 9.h3 Na5 10.Bc2 c5 11.d4 Qc7 12.Nbd2 Nc6 13.dxc5 dxc5 14.Nf1 Be6 15.Ne3 Rad8 16.Qe2 g6 17.Ng5 Bc8 18.a4 Qb7 19.axb5 axb5 20.h4 Bd6 21.Nd5 Nh5 22.Nf3 f6 23.Bh6 Rf7 24.Red1 Bg4 25.Qe3 Ng7 26.Rd2 Ne8 27.Nh2 Be6 28.Qg3 Kh8 29.Rad1 Rdd7 30.Nf1 Bb8 31.Be3 Na5 32.Bxc5 Nc4 33.Re2 Nxb2 34.Rb1 Qc6 35.Bb4 Nc4 36.h5 g5 37.Nfe3 Ned6 38.Bxd6 Nxd6 39.Bd3 Rb7 40.Reb2 h6 41.Qf3 Ba7 42.c4 bxc4 43.Rxb7 Nxb7 44.Nxc4 Kg7 45.Be2 Bd4 46.Nde3 Bxe3 47.Nxe3 ½–½

=== Game 11: Botvinnik–Smyslov, ½–½ ===
Reti Opening (ECO A05)
1.Nf3 Nf6 2.g3 g6 3.Bg2 Bg7 4.c4 c6 5.d4 d5 6.cxd5 cxd5 7.Nc3 0-0 8.Ne5 Nc6 9.0-0 Bf5 10.Nxc6 bxc6 11.Na4 Nd7 12.b3 e5 13.dxe5 Bxe5 14.Bh6 Re8 15.Rc1 Rc8 16.Qd2 Qe7 17.Rfe1 Bd6 18.Qd4 Qf6 19.Qxf6 Nxf6 20.Nc5 Nd7 21.Nxd7 Bxd7 22.e4 Ba3 23.Rcd1 Bg4 ½–½

=== Game 12: Smyslov–Botvinnik, 1–0 ===
Sicilian (ECO B27)
1.e4 c5 2.Nf3 g6 3.c4 Bg7 4.d4 d6 5.Nc3 Nc6 6.Be3 Bg4 7.dxc5 dxc5 8.Qxd8+ Rxd8 9.Bxc5 Bxc3+ 10.bxc3 Nf6 11.Nd4 Nxe4 12.Nxc6 bxc6 13.Bxa7 Bf5 14.f3 Nd6 15.a4 Ra8 16.Bb6 0-0 17.c5 Nc8 18.g4 Be6 19.a5 Nxb6 20.cxb6 Rfb8 21.Bd3 Rxb6 22.axb6 Rxa1+ 23.Kd2 Ra2+ 24.Ke3 Bc8 25.Rd1 Rb2 26.Bc4 Kg7 27.Rd8 Be6 28.Bxe6 fxe6 29.Rb8 e5 30.c4 Kf7 31.c5 Ke6 32.Rd8 g5 33.h3 Rb1 34.Kd2 Rb5 35.Kd3 Rb1 36.Kc4 Rc1+ 37.Kb4 Rb1+ 38.Ka4 Ra1+ 39.Kb4 Rb1+ 40.Ka3 Ra1+ 41.Kb2 Ra5 42.Rd3 Ra8 43.Kb3 Ra5 1–0

=== Game 13: Botvinnik–Smyslov, 1–0 ===
Nimzo-Indian (ECO E45)
1.c4 Nf6 2.Nc3 e6 3.d4 Bb4 4.e3 b6 5.Ne2 Ba6 6.a3 Bxc3+ 7.Nxc3 d5 8.b3 0-0 9.a4 c5 10.Ba3 dxc4 11.bxc4 Nc6 12.Nb5 Bb7 13.Be2 Ne4 14.Bf3 Ng5 15.Bxc6 Bxc6 16.f3 a6 17.Nc3 f5 18.0-0 Qf6 19.Qd3 Rfd8 20.d5 Nf7 21.e4 exd5 22.cxd5 Bd7 23.Bb2 Ne5 24.Qe2 f4 25.Nd1 b5 26.Nf2 c4 27.axb5 axb5 28.Qd2 Rac8 29.Rfc1 Re8 30.Bc3 Rc7 31.Kh1 Rb7 32.Ra2 h5 33.Rca1 b4 34.Bxb4 Qb6 35.Bc3 Qe3 36.Nd1 Qxd2 37.Rxd2 Nd3 38.Bd4 Reb8 39.Nc3 Rb3 40.h4 R8b7 41.Ra8+ 1–0

=== Game 14: Smyslov–Botvinnik, ½–½ ===
French, Winawer (ECO C18)
1.e4 e6 2.d4 d5 3.Nc3 Bb4 4.e5 c5 5.a3 Bxc3+ 6.bxc3 Qc7 7.Qg4 f5 8.Qg3 Ne7 9.Bd2 0-0 10.Bd3 b6 11.Nh3 Ba6 12.Nf4 Qd7 13.h4 Bxd3 14.cxd3 Nbc6 15.Be3 cxd4 16.cxd4 Rac8 17.h5 Na5 18.h6 g6 19.0-0 Kh8 20.Rab1 Ng8 21.Bd2 Nc6 22.Ne2 Nd8 23.Rfc1 Nf7 24.Qh4 Rxc1+ 25.Rxc1 Rc8 26.f3 Rxc1+ 27.Bxc1 Qe7 28.Qxe7 Nxe7 29.Nf4 Nd8 30.g4 fxg4 31.fxg4 Nec6 32.Ne2 Kg8 33.Kf2 Kf8 34.Ke1 Nf7 35.g5 Ke7 36.Kd1 Kd7 37.Kc2 b5 38.Kb3 a6 39.a4 Kc7 40.axb5 axb5 41.Bd2 Kb6 42.Ka3 Kb7 43.Kb2 Ka6 44.Ka3 Nfd8 45.Be1 Ne7 46.Nc1 ½–½

=== Game 15: Botvinnik–Smyslov, ½–½ ===
Nimzo-Indian (ECO E45)
1.c4 Nf6 2.Nc3 e6 3.d4 Bb4 4.e3 b6 5.Ne2 Ba6 6.a3 Bxc3+ 7.Nxc3 d5 8.b3 0-0 9.Be2 dxc4 10.bxc4 Nc6 11.a4 Qd7 12.Nb5 Rfd8 13.Bb2 Na5 14.Qc2 c6 15.Na3 Qe7 16.0-0 c5 17.Nb5 Bb7 18.Ba3 Nc6 19.Rfd1 a6 20.Nc3 Nb4 21.Qb3 a5 22.Nb5 h6 23.Bb2 Rac8 24.f3 cxd4 25.exd4 Nh5 26.Bf1 Qg5 27.Ba3 Nf4 28.Kh1 h5 29.Bxb4 axb4 30.Qxb4 h4 31.Ra3 Rc5 32.Re1 Rf5 33.Nd6 Nxg2 34.Bxg2 h3 35.Bxh3 Bxf3+ 36.Rxf3 Rxf3 37.Nxf7 Rxf7 38.Bxe6 Rxd4 39.Qxb6 Rf4 40.Bxf7+ Rxf7 41.Qe6 Qf4 42.Qc6 Rf5 43.Qa8+ Kh7 44.Qe4 Qxe4+ 45.Rxe4 Ra5 46.Kg2 Kg6 47.Kf3 Kf5 48.Rf4+ Ke5 49.Re4+ Kf5 50.Rf4+ Ke5 51.Kg4 Rxa4 52.Kg5 Ra6 53.h4 Rc6 54.h5 Ke6 55.Kg6 Ke5 56.Kg5 Ke6 ½–½

=== Game 16: Smyslov–Botvinnik, ½–½ ===
Ruy Lopez, Closed, Chigorin (ECO C98)
1.e4 e5 2.Nf3 Nc6 3.Bb5 a6 4.Ba4 Nf6 5.0-0 Be7 6.Re1 b5 7.Bb3 0-0 8.c3 d6 9.h3 Na5 10.Bc2 c5 11.d4 Qc7 12.Nbd2 Nc6 13.dxc5 dxc5 14.Nf1 Bd6 15.Nh4 g6 16.Bh6 Rd8 17.Qf3 Ne8 18.Ne3 f6 19.Nd5 Qf7 20.Nb6 Rb8 21.Nxc8 Rbxc8 22.g3 Bf8 23.Be3 Kh8 24.Ng2 Nc7 25.Rad1 Rxd1 26.Rxd1 Rd8 27.Rxd8 Nxd8 28.a4 Qe6 29.axb5 axb5 30.h4 Kg7 31.h5 g5 32.Bc1 Nb7 33.Ne3 Nd6 34.Nf5+ Nxf5 35.exf5 Qd5 36.Be4 Qd6 37.Be3 h6 38.Kg2 Be7 39.b3 Kf8 40.Bc6 Qd3 41.Kh2 Kf7 42.Bb7 e4 43.Bxe4 Qxc3 44.Bd5+ Nxd5 45.Qxd5+ Kf8 46.Kg2 Qc2 47.g4 Qe2 48.Kg3 Qc2 49.Kf3 Qc3 50.Kg2 Qc2 51.Qa8+ Kf7 52.Qd5+ Kf8 53.Kf3 Qc3 54.Qa8+ Kf7 55.Qd5+ Kf8 ½–½

=== Game 17: Botvinnik–Smyslov, 0–1 ===
English (ECO A15)
1.Nf3 Nf6 2.g3 g6 3.c4 c6 4.Bg2 Bg7 5.d4 0-0 6.Nc3 d5 7.cxd5 cxd5 8.Ne5 b6 9.Bg5 Bb7 10.Bxf6 Bxf6 11.0-0 e6 12.f4 Bg7 13.Rc1 f6 14.Nf3 Nc6 15.e3 Qd7 16.Qe2 Na5 17.h4 Nc4 18.Bh3 Nd6 19.Kh2 a5 20.Rfe1 b5 21.Nd1 b4 22.Nf2 Ba6 23.Qd1 Rfc8 24.Rxc8+ Rxc8 25.Bf1 Bxf1 26.Rxf1 Qc6 27.Nd3 Qc2+ 28.Qxc2 Rxc2+ 29.Rf2 Rxf2+ 30.Nxf2 Nc4 31.Nd1 Kf7 32.b3 Nd6 33.Kg2 h5 34.Kh3 Ne4 35.g4 hxg4 36.Kxg4 f5+ 37.Kh3 Bf6 38.Ne1 Kg7 39.Nd3 Nc3 40.Nxc3 bxc3 41.Ne1 Kh6 42.Nc2 Be7 43.Kg3 Kh5 44.Kf3 Kxh4 45.Ne1 g5 46.fxg5 Kxg5 47.Nc2 Bd6 48.Ne1 Kh4 49.Nc2 Kh3 50.Na1 Kh2 51.Kf2 Bg3+ 52.Kf3 Bh4 53.Nc2 Kg1 54.Ke2 Kg2 55.Na1 Be7 56.Nc2 Kg3 57.Ne1 Bd8 58.Nc2 Bf6 59.a3 Be7 60.b4 a4 61.Ne1 Bg5 62.Nc2 Bf6 63.Kd3 Kf2 64.Na1 Bd8 65.Nc2 Bg5 66.b5 Bd8 67.Nb4 Bb6 68.Nc2 Ba5 69.Nb4 Ke1 0–1

=== Game 18: Smyslov–Botvinnik, ½–½ ===
French, Winawer (ECO C15)
1.e4 e6 2.d4 d5 3.Nc3 Bb4 4.a3 Bxc3+ 5.bxc3 dxe4 6.Qg4 Nf6 7.Qxg7 Rg8 8.Qh6 c5 9.Ne2 Rg6 10.Qe3 Nc6 11.Bd2 Ne7 12.Ng3 Bd7 13.dxc5 Qc7 14.c4 Bc6 15.Be2 Ng4 16.Bxg4 Rxg4 17.h3 Rg6 18.Nxe4 Nf5 19.Nd6+ Qxd6 20.cxd6 Nxe3 21.Bxe3 Bxg2 22.Rg1 Kd7 23.h4 h5 24.c5 Rag8 25.Rb1 Bf3 26.Rxg6 Rxg6 27.Kd2 e5 28.Kd3 f6 29.Bd2 Rg2 30.Ke3 Bc6 31.Bc3 Ke6 32.f4 Rxc2 33.Kd3 Rg2 34.fxe5 f5 35.Rb4 Be4+ 36.Kd4 Rg4 37.Be1 a5 38.Rb2 Bd5+ 39.Kd3 Ra4 40.Ke2 Rxa3 41.Rd2 Bc4+ 42.Kf2 Kd7 43.Rd4 Bb5 44.Bd2 a4 45.Bg5 Rd3 46.Rxd3 Bxd3 47.Bc1 Bb5 48.Ke3 Ke6 49.Kf4 Bd7 50.Bb2 Kd5 51.Ba3 Bc8 52.Bc1 Be6 53.Ba3 Bd7 54.Bc1 Kd4 55.Ba3 Be6 56.Bb4 Bc8 57.Ba3 Be6 58.Bb4 Bd7 59.Ba3 Bc8 60.Bc1 Kd5 61.Ba3 Bd7 62.Bc1 ½–½

=== Game 19: Botvinnik–Smyslov, ½–½ ===
English (ECO A36)
1.c4 g6 2.Nc3 c5 3.g3 Bg7 4.Bg2 Nc6 5.e3 e6 6.Nge2 Nge7 7.d4 cxd4 8.Nxd4 d5 9.cxd5 Nxd4 10.exd4 Nxd5 11.0-0 0-0 12.Qb3 Qb6 13.Nxd5 exd5 14.Bxd5 Qxb3 15.Bxb3 Bxd4 ½–½

=== Game 20: Smyslov–Botvinnik, 1–0 ===
French, Winawer (ECO C18)
1.e4 e6 2.d4 d5 3.Nc3 Bb4 4.e5 c5 5.a3 Bxc3+ 6.bxc3 Qc7 7.Qg4 f6 8.Nf3 Nc6 9.Qg3 Qf7 10.dxc5 Nge7 11.Bd3 fxe5 12.Nxe5 Nxe5 13.Qxe5 0-0 14.0-0 Nc6 15.Qg3 e5 16.Be3 Bf5 17.Rab1 Bxd3 18.cxd3 Rae8 19.f4 Qc7 20.fxe5 Rxf1+ 21.Rxf1 Qxe5 22.Qxe5 Nxe5 23.Rd1 Kf7 24.h3 Nc6 25.Bf4 Re7 26.Bd6 Rd7 27.Rf1+ Ke6 28.Re1+ Kf7 29.Kf2 b6 30.Rb1 Ke6 31.Rb5 d4 32.c4 bxc5 33.Bh2 Rf7+ 34.Ke2 Re7 35.Rxc5 Kd7 36.Kd2 Re6 37.Rg5 g6 38.Rd5+ Kc8 39.Bg1 Rf6 40.Bxd4 Nxd4 41.Rxd4 Rf2+ 42.Kc3 1–0

=== Game 21: Botvinnik–Smyslov, ½–½ ===
King's Indian Defense (ECO E60)
1.d4 Nf6 2.c4 g6 3.g3 c6 4.Bg2 d5 5.cxd5 cxd5 6.Nc3 Bg7 7.Nf3 0-0 8.Ne5 Bf5 9.0-0 Ne4 10.Nxe4 Bxe4 11.f3 Bf5 12.Be3 Nd7 13.Nxd7 Qxd7 ½–½

=== Game 22: Smyslov–Botvinnik, ½–½ ===
French (ECO C11)
1.e4 e6 2.d4 d5 3.Nc3 Nf6 4.Bg5 dxe4 5.Nxe4 Nbd7 6.Nf3 Be7 7.Nxf6+ Bxf6 8.Bxf6 Qxf6 9.Qd2 0-0 10.Qg5 Qxg5 11.Nxg5 ½–½
