= World Chess Championship 1958 =

Chess match between Vasily Smyslov and Mikhail Botvinnik

	Defending champion	Challenger
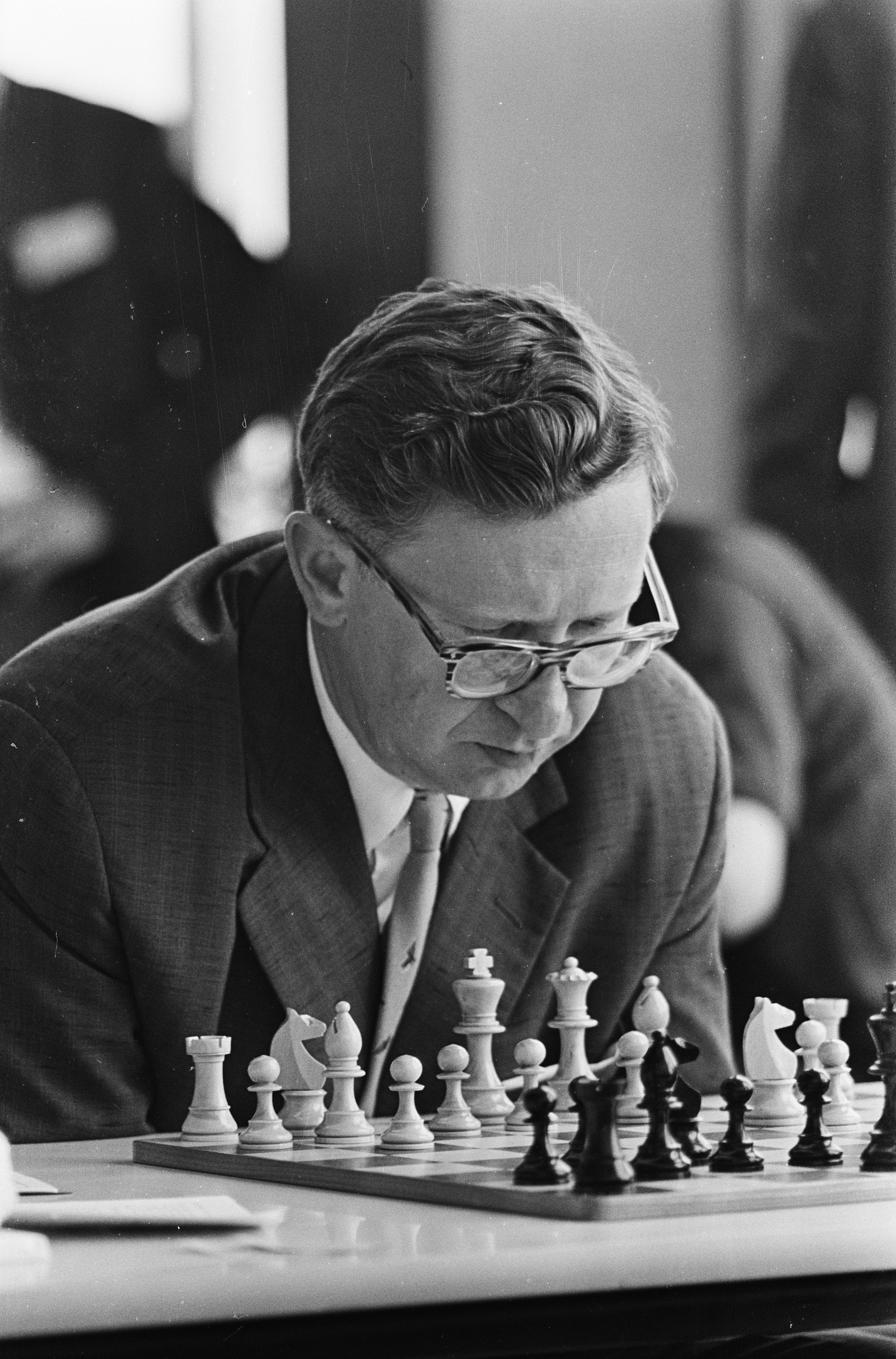
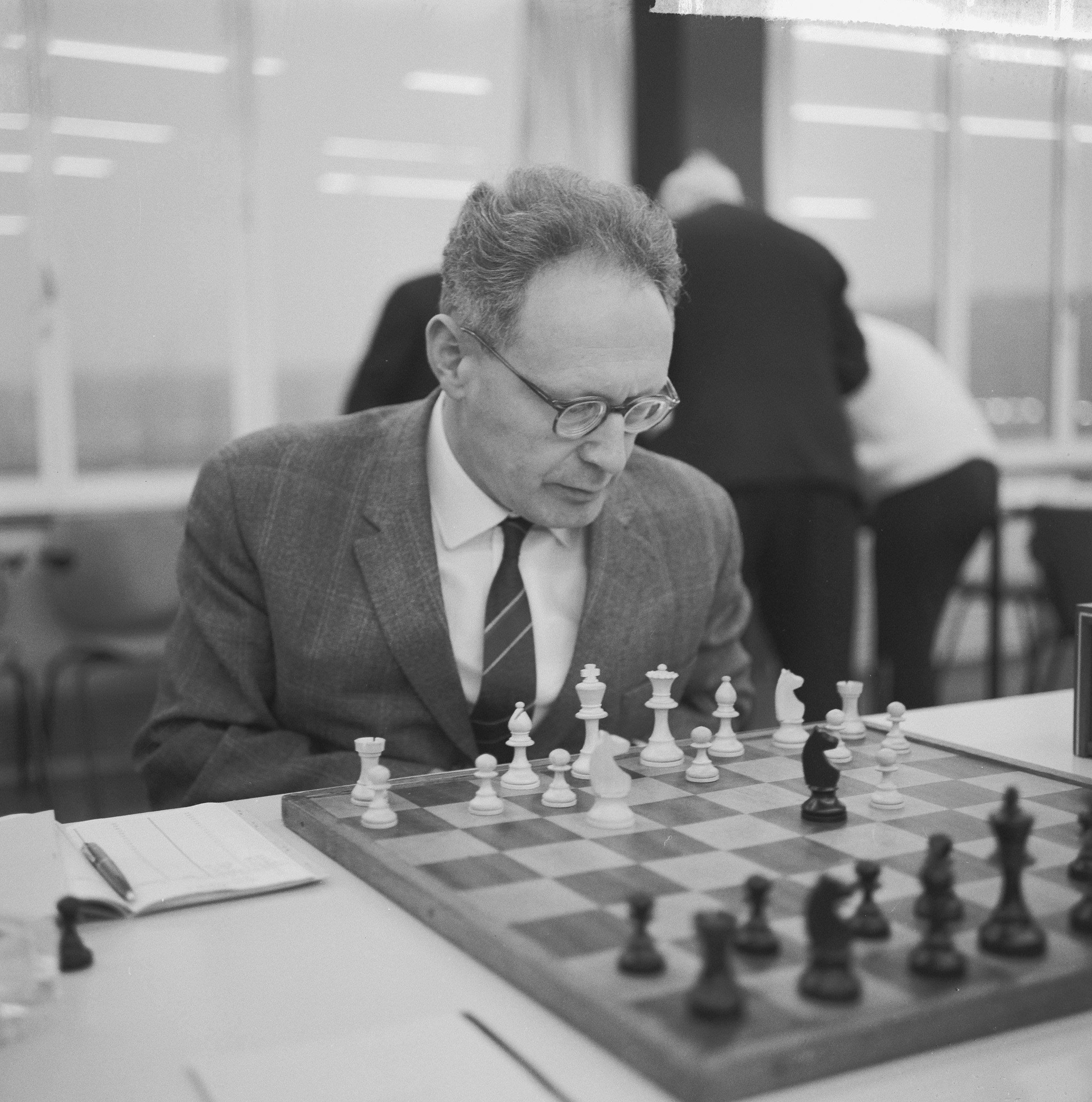
	Vassily Smyslov	Mikhail Botvinnik
	(Soviet Union) Vasily Smyslov	(Soviet Union) Mikhail Botvinnik
10½	Scores	12½
	Born 24 March 1921; 36/37 years old	Born 17 August 1911; 46 years old
	Winner of the 1957 World Chess Championship	Former world champion

A World Chess Championship was played between Mikhail Botvinnik and Vasily Smyslov in Moscow from March 4 to May 9, 1958. Botvinnik won. Smyslov had unseated Botvinnik in the 1957 match, so he was entitled to this rematch a year later.

Botvinnik was eager to regain his title and spent the intervening year obsessively preparing. He surprised Smyslov with the Caro–Kann opening, which he was unprepared for. Botvinnik used the Caro-Kann in two of his opening three wins, and he adopted a more cautious style for the rest of the match after getting an early lead.

== Background ==
The two had met in the two previous world championships, 1954 and 1957. Botvinnik had been world champion from 1948 to 1957, when he was unseated by Smyslov. This, by FIDE rules, entitled him to a rematch the next year without qualification. Botvinnik's comeback was seen emblematic of the perceived ideals of the golden age of Soviet chess.

The prize fund was established as 5,000 rubles to the winner.

== Results ==
The match was played as best of 24 games. If it ended 12–12, Smyslov, the holder, would retain the Championship.

World Chess Championship Match 1958
	1	2	3	4	5	6	7	8	9	10	11	12	13	14	15	16	17	18	19	20	21	22	23	Points
Mikhail Botvinnik (Soviet Union)	1	1	1	½	0	1	½	½	½	½	0	1	½	1	0	½	½	1	0	½	½	0	½	12½
Vasily Smyslov (Soviet Union)	0	0	0	½	1	0	½	½	½	½	1	0	½	0	1	½	½	0	1	½	½	1	½	10½

Botvinnik regained his title.

== Games ==
=== Game 1: Smyslov–Botvinnik, 0–1 ===
Caro–Kann, Two Knights (ECO B11)
1.e4 c6 2.Nc3 d5 3.Nf3 Bg4 4.h3 Bxf3 5.Qxf3 Nf6 6.d3 e6 7.Be2 Nbd7 8.Qg3 g6 9.0-0 Bg7 10.Bf4 Qb6 11.Rab1 0-0 12.Bc7 Qd4 13.Bf3 e5 14.Bd6 Rfe8 15.Ba3 dxe4 16.dxe4 b5 17.Rfd1 Qb6 18.b3 Nc5 19.Bc1 Qc7 20.Be3 Ne6 21.a4 a6 22.b4 Rad8 23.Be2 Qe7 24.axb5 axb5 25.Rxd8 Rxd8 26.Bb6 Ra8 27.f3 Ra3 28.Qe1 Bh6 29.Bf1 Nd4 30.Bc5 Qe6 31.Bd3 Nd7 32.Bxd4 exd4 33.Ne2 Be3+ 34.Kh1 Ne5 35.Qf1 Qd6 36.f4 Nxd3 37.cxd3 Rxd3 38.Qf3 Rd2 39.Rf1 Qxb4 40.e5 Qc4 41.Ng3 Rc2 42.f5 Rc1 43.e6 fxe6 44.fxg6 Rxf1+ 45.Nxf1 hxg6 46.Qf6 b4 47.Kh2 g5 48.Nxe3 dxe3 49.Qxg5+ Kf7 50.Qxe3 b3 51.Qe5 c5 52.Qc7+ Kg6 53.Qb8 Kf5 54.Qf8+ Ke4 55.Qf6 Qd5 56.Qf3+ Kd4 57.Qd1+ Ke5 58.Qe2+ Kd6 59.Qa6+ Ke7 60.Qa7+ Kf6 61.Qh7 Qe5+ 62.Kh1 b2 0–1

=== Game 2: Botvinnik–Smyslov, 1–0 ===
King's Indian, Samisch (ECO E81)
1.d4 Nf6 2.c4 g6 3.Nc3 Bg7 4.e4 d6 5.f3 0-0 6.Be3 a6 7.Bd3 Nc6 8.Nge2 Rb8 9.a3 Nd7 10.Bb1 Na5 11.Ba2 b5 12.cxb5 axb5 13.b4 Nc4 14.Bxc4 bxc4 15.0-0 c6 16.Qd2 Nb6 17.Bh6 Bxh6 18.Qxh6 f6 19.a4 Na8 20.Rfb1 f5 21.Qe3 fxe4 22.fxe4 Nc7 23.d5 cxd5 24.exd5 Bb7 25.Rf1 Qd7 26.Qd4 e6 27.dxe6 Nxe6 28.Qg4 Rfe8 29.Nd4 Qg7 30.Rad1 Nc7 31.Qf4 Re5 32.Nc6 Bxc6 33.Qxc4+ d5 34.Qxc6 Rd8 35.Qb6 Qe7 36.Qd4 Qd6 37.Rfe1 Rde8 38.Rxe5 Rxe5 39.b5 Ne6 40.Qa7 d4 41.Ne4 1–0

=== Game 3: Smyslov–Botvinnik, 0–1 ===
Caro–Kann, Classical (ECO B18)
1.e4 c6 2.Nc3 d5 3.d4 dxe4 4.Nxe4 Bf5 5.Ng3 Bg6 6.h4 h6 7.Nf3 Nd7 8.Bd3 Bxd3 9.Qxd3 Qc7 10.Bd2 Ngf6 11.0-0-0 e6 12.Kb1 0-0-0 13.c4 c5 14.Bc3 cxd4 15.Nxd4 a6 16.Qe2 Bd6 17.Ne4 Nxe4 18.Qxe4 Nf6 19.Qe2 Rd7 20.Rc1 Qc5 21.Nb3 Qf5+ 22.Rc2 Bc7 23.c5 Rd5 24.c6 Bb6 25.Nd2 Qd3 26.Nc4 Bc7 27.Qxd3 Rxd3 28.Ne5 Rxc3 29.cxb7 Kxb7 30.Rxc3 Bxe5 31.Rb3+ Ka7 32.Rc1 Rb8 33.Rxb8 Kxb8 34.Rc4 Nd5 35.Kc2 h5 36.b4 Kb7 37.Kb3 Bd6 38.a3 Bc7 39.Rc2 Bb6 40.Kc4 Nf4 41.g3 Nh3 42.f3 Ng1 43.f4 Nf3 44.a4 Nd4 45.Rd2 Nf5 46.a5 Be3 47.Rd8 Bf2 48.b5 Kc7 49.Rg8 axb5 50.Kxb5 Bxg3 51.a6 Bf2 52.Ka5 g6 53.Ra8 Be1+ 54.Kb5 Nd6+ 55.Ka4 Nc8 56.Kb5 Bf2 57.Ka5 Ba7 58.Kb5 f6 59.Kb4 e5 60.fxe5 fxe5 61.Kc3 Bb8 62.Kd3 Nb6 63.a7 Nxa8 64.axb8=Q+ Kxb8 65.Ke4 Nb6 66.Kxe5 Nd7+ 0–1

=== Game 4: Botvinnik–Smyslov, ½–½ ===
Grünfeld, Russian (ECO D98)
1.d4 Nf6 2.c4 g6 3.Nc3 d5 4.Nf3 Bg7 5.Qb3 dxc4 6.Qxc4 0-0 7.e4 Bg4 8.Be3 Nfd7 9.Be2 Nb6 10.Qc5 c6 11.Rd1 N8d7 12.Qa5 e5 13.d5 cxd5 14.Nxd5 Nxd5 15.Qxd5 Be6 16.Qd2 Nf6 17.Qb4 a5 18.Qb5 Qe8 19.Nd2 Qxb5 20.Bxb5 Bxa2 21.Ke2 Be6 22.f3 Rfc8 23.Rc1 Ne8 24.Bd3 Nd6 25.Rxc8+ Rxc8 26.Ra1 Ra8 27.Bb6 a4 28.Nb1 Nc4 29.Bxc4 Bxc4+ 30.Ke1 Bf8 31.Na3 Bb3 32.Rc1 Ra6 33.Be3 Rc6 34.Rxc6 bxc6 35.Kd2 f5 36.Kc3 fxe4 37.fxe4 Kf7 38.Nc4 Ke6 39.Ba7 Ba2 40.Bb8 Bh6 41.Bc7 Bb1 42.Nd2 Bxd2+ 43.Kxd2 Bxe4 44.g3 Kd5 45.Kc3 Bg2 46.h4 Bf3 47.Bb8 c5 48.Bc7 Be4 49.Bb8 Bb1 50.Bc7 e4 51.Bf4 Bd3 52.Be3 c4 53.Bf4 Ke6 54.Kd2 Kf5 55.Bd6 Kg4 56.Ke3 Bb1 57.Be5 c3 58.Bxc3 Kxg3 59.Bf6 Kg4 60.Be7 Kf5 61.Bg5 Ke5 62.Bh6 Bc2 63.Bg5 Bb3 64.Bh6 Bd5 65.Bg5 Kf5 66.Bh6 Kg4 67.Bg5 Kg3 68.Bd8 Kg2 69.Be7 Kf1 70.Bb4 h6 71.Bf8 g5 72.h5 g4 73.Bxh6 g3 74.Bf4 g2 75.Bh2 Bf7 76.Kxe4 Bxh5 77.Kd3 g1=Q 78.Bxg1 Kxg1 79.Kc2 Bg6+ 80.Kc3 Bf7 81.Kc2 Ba2 82.b4 ½–½

=== Game 5: Smyslov–Botvinnik, 1–0 ===
Sicilian (ECO B58)
1.e4 c5 2.Nf3 Nc6 3.d4 cxd4 4.Nxd4 Nf6 5.Nc3 d6 6.Be2 g6 7.Be3 Bg7 8.h4 0-0 9.h5 d5 10.hxg6 hxg6 11.exd5 Nxd5 12.Nxc6 bxc6 13.Nxd5 Qxd5 14.Qxd5 cxd5 15.0-0-0 Bb7 16.f4 d4 17.Bxd4 Bxg2 18.Rhg1 Be4 19.Bxg7 Kxg7 20.Rd7 Kf6 21.Rd4 Bf5 22.Rgd1 Rac8 23.R1d2 Rc7 24.b3 Rh8 25.Bc4 Rh3 26.Kb2 Re3 27.a4 e5 28.fxe5 Kxe5 29.a5 Be6 30.Bxe6 Kxe6 31.Rd8 Ke7 32.Rb8 Re6 33.c4 a6 34.Kc3 f5 35.Rdd8 f4 36.Re8+ Kf6 37.Rxe6+ Kxe6 38.Kd4 Rf7 39.Ke4 Kd6 40.Rb6+ Kc5 41.Kd3 1–0

=== Game 6: Botvinnik–Smyslov, 1–0 ===
Modern Defense, Averbakh System (ECO A42)
1.c4 g6 2.e4 Bg7 3.d4 d6 4.Nc3 a6 5.Be3 Nf6 6.f3 c6 7.Bd3 b5 8.Qd2 bxc4 9.Bxc4 d5 10.Bb3 dxe4 11.Nxe4 0-0 12.Ne2 a5 13.0-0 a4 14.Bc4 Nbd7 15.Rac1 Rb8 16.Nxf6+ Bxf6 17.Nc3 Nb6 18.Be2 Be6 19.Rfd1 Bg7 20.Bh6 Bxh6 21.Qxh6 f6 22.Rd2 Bf7 23.h4 Qd7 24.a3 Rfd8 25.Ne4 Qe8 26.Bf1 Bd5 27.Nc5 Qf8 28.Qxf8+ Kxf8 29.Na6 Rbc8 30.Nb4 Bb3 31.Rxc6 Rxc6 32.Nxc6 Rd6 33.Na5 Ba2 34.Nb7 Rd5 35.Nc5 e5 36.Ne4 Rxd4 37.Rxd4 exd4 38.Nxf6 Ke7 39.Nxh7 Bb1 40.Ba6 Nd5 41.Kf2 Ne3 42.Be2 Ke6 43.Ng5+ Kd5 44.Ne4 Bxe4 45.fxe4+ Kxe4 46.g4 Kf4 47.h5 gxh5 48.gxh5 Kg5 49.Kf3 1–0

=== Game 7: Smyslov–Botvinnik, ½–½ ===
Sicilian (ECO B58)
1.e4 c5 2.Nf3 Nc6 3.d4 cxd4 4.Nxd4 Nf6 5.Nc3 d6 6.Be2 g6 7.Be3 Bg7 8.h4 0-0 9.h5 d5 10.hxg6 fxg6 11.exd5 Nxd5 12.Nxd5 Qxd5 13.Bf3 Qc4 14.c3 Nxd4 15.cxd4 Be6 16.Qb3 ½–½

=== Game 8: Botvinnik–Smyslov, ½–½ ===
King's Indian, Fianchetto, Classical Main line (ECO E69)
1.c4 Nf6 2.Nc3 e5 3.g3 c6 4.Nf3 d6 5.Bg2 g6 6.0-0 Bg7 7.d4 Nbd7 8.e4 0-0 9.h3 Ne8 10.Bg5 f6 11.Be3 f5 12.Qd2 Qf6 13.exf5 gxf5 14.Bg5 Qf7 15.b3 f4 16.dxe5 Nxe5 17.Bxf4 Nxf3+ 18.Bxf3 Bxh3 19.Bg2 Bxg2 20.Kxg2 Nf6 21.Qd3 d5 22.Rad1 Nh5 23.Bd2 dxc4 24.Qxc4 Qxc4 25.bxc4 Rad8 26.Ne2 Nf6 27.Nf4 Rfe8 28.Bc1 Kf7 29.Be3 b6 30.Rh1 h6 31.Rxd8 Rxd8 32.Kf3 c5 33.a4 Rd6 34.Rc1 Nd7 35.Ke2 Ne5 36.Bd2 Nc6 37.Nd5 Re6+ 38.Be3 Bd4 39.Rh1 Bg7 40.Rc1 Nd4+ 41.Kd3 ½–½

=== Game 9: Smyslov–Botvinnik, ½–½ ===
Sicilian (ECO B58)
1.e4 c5 2.Nf3 Nc6 3.d4 cxd4 4.Nxd4 Nf6 5.Nc3 d6 6.Be2 g6 7.Be3 Bg7 8.h4 h5 9.f3 0-0 10.Qd2 d5 11.Nxc6 bxc6 12.e5 Ne8 13.f4 f6 14.0-0-0 fxe5 15.fxe5 Bxe5 16.g4 Bxg4 17.Bxg4 hxg4 18.h5 g5 19.Bxg5 Qd6 20.Rh4 Nf6 21.Bxf6 Qxf6 22.Rxg4+ Kh8 23.Kb1 Rg8 24.Rb4 a5 25.Rb6 Bxc3 26.bxc3 Rab8 27.Rxb8 Rxb8+ 28.Ka1 Rg8 29.Qe3 Rg4 30.a3 Re4 31.Qd3 Qe5 32.Kb2 Re3 33.Qd4 Qxd4 34.cxd4 Kg7 35.Rg1+ Kf7 36.h6 Rh3 37.Rg7+ Kf6 38.Rh7 Rh4 39.Kc3 Rh3+ 40.Kb2 Rh4 ½–½

=== Game 10: Botvinnik–Smyslov, ½–½ ===
English (ECO A16)
1.c4 Nf6 2.Nc3 d5 3.cxd5 Nxd5 4.g3 g6 5.Bg2 Nxc3 6.bxc3 Bg7 7.Ba3 Nd7 8.Nf3 c5 9.Qa4 0-0 10.Rb1 a6 11.c4 Rb8 12.0-0 Qc7 13.d3 Rd8 14.Bb2 Nf8 15.Bxg7 Kxg7 16.Rb2 Ne6 17.Rfb1 b5 18.cxb5 axb5 19.Qe4 Bd7 20.Ne5 Be8 21.Nc6 Bxc6 22.Qxc6 Qxc6 23.Bxc6 b4 24.Rc1 Nd4 25.Ba4 Ra8 26.Bb3 Ra5 27.Kf1 e6 28.Ke1 Kf6 29.Bc4 Ke7 30.h4 Rda8 31.e3 Nb5 32.d4 Nd6 33.Bb3 cxd4 34.exd4 Rd8 35.Rc7+ Kf6 36.Rd2 Ne4 37.Rd3 Rf5 38.f4 Nc5 39.Rd1 Nxb3 40.axb3 Rfd5 41.Rc4 Rb8 42.Ra1 Kf5 43.Kf2 Kg4 44.Ra7 ½–½

=== Game 11: Smyslov–Botvinnik, 1–0 ===
Grünfeld, Russian (ECO D98)
1.d4 Nf6 2.c4 g6 3.Nc3 d5 4.Nf3 Bg7 5.Qb3 dxc4 6.Qxc4 0-0 7.e4 Bg4 8.Be3 Nfd7 9.Rd1 Nb6 10.Qb3 Nc6 11.d5 Ne5 12.Be2 Nxf3+ 13.gxf3 Bh5 14.h4 Qd7 15.a4 a5 16.Nb5 Nc8 17.Bd4 Nd6 18.Bxg7 Kxg7 19.Nd4 Kg8 20.Rg1 Qh3 21.Qe3 c5 22.dxc6 bxc6 23.Qg5 c5 24.Nc6 1–0

=== Game 12: Botvinnik–Smyslov, 1–0 ===
English (ECO A12)
1.c4 Nf6 2.g3 c6 3.Nf3 d5 4.b3 Bf5 5.Bg2 e6 6.Bb2 Nbd7 7.0-0 h6 8.d3 Be7 9.Nbd2 0-0 10.a3 a5 11.Qc2 Bh7 12.Bc3 b5 13.cxb5 cxb5 14.b4 Qc7 15.Qb2 Nb6 16.Be5 Qd7 17.Nb3 axb4 18.axb4 Rxa1 19.Rxa1 Na4 20.Qd2 Rc8 21.Rc1 Rxc1+ 22.Nxc1 Ne8 23.Nd4 Kf8 24.Bh3 Bg8 25.Ndb3 f6 26.Ba1 Qa7 27.d4 Nd6 28.Qa2 Nc4 29.Nc5 Bxc5 30.dxc5 e5 31.Qb1 d4 32.Qf5 Qc7 33.Nd3 Bf7 34.Qh7 Bg8 35.Qe4 Bf7 36.Qa8+ Be8 37.Bg2 Ke7 38.f4 Ne3 39.fxe5 fxe5 40.Qe4 Nxg2 41.Nxe5 1–0

=== Game 13: Smyslov–Botvinnik, ½–½ ===
Queen's Gambit Declined Semi-Slav (ECO D47)
1.d4 d5 2.c4 c6 3.Nf3 Nf6 4.Nc3 e6 5.e3 Nbd7 6.Bd3 dxc4 7.Bxc4 b5 8.Bd3 b4 9.Ne4 Nxe4 10.Bxe4 Bb7 11.0-0 Bd6 12.Bd2 0-0 13.Rc1 Rc8 14.Qe2 Qb6 15.Rfd1 Be7 16.Be1 Nf6 17.Bb1 c5 18.dxc5 Rxc5 19.Rxc5 Qxc5 20.Nd4 Rd8 21.Nb3 Qb6 22.Rxd8+ Bxd8 23.f3 Bd5 24.Bf2 Bxb3 25.axb3 Be7 26.Bd3 Bc5 27.Bc4 Ne8 28.Kf1 Nd6 29.Bd3 g6 30.Qd2 f5 31.Bc4 Kf7 32.Bg3 Qc6 33.Qd3 a5 34.Ke2 Ke7 35.Bh4+ Kf7 36.Bg3 Ke7 37.Bf4 Bb6 38.Bxd6+ Qxd6 39.Qxd6+ Kxd6 40.Bb5 Bd8 41.f4 ½–½

=== Game 14: Botvinnik–Smyslov, 1–0 ===
English (ECO A16)
1.c4 Nf6 2.Nc3 d5 3.cxd5 Nxd5 4.g3 g6 5.Bg2 Nxc3 6.bxc3 Bg7 7.Rb1 Nd7 8.c4 0-0 9.Nf3 Rb8 10.0-0 b6 11.d4 e5 12.Ba3 Re8 13.dxe5 Bb7 14.Qc2 Nxe5 15.Rfd1 Qc8 16.Nxe5 Bxg2 17.Kxg2 Rxe5 18.Rd5 Qe6 19.Rxe5 Bxe5 20.Rd1 Re8 21.Qe4 Bf6 22.Qxe6 Rxe6 23.Kf3 Rc6 24.Rc1 Bd4 25.e3 Bc5 26.Bb2 f5 27.Ke2 Kf7 28.h3 Be7 29.a4 h5 30.Kd3 h4 31.g4 Rc5 32.Bc3 Rc6 33.Rg1 Rd6+ 34.Kc2 Bf6 35.gxf5 gxf5 36.Bxf6 Kxf6 37.Rg8 Rc6 38.Kc3 a6 39.Rh8 Kg5 40.Rg8+ Kf6 41.Rh8 Kg5 42.Kd4 Rc5 43.Rh7 Kg6 44.Rd7 Kf6 45.Rd5 Rc6 46.Kc3 Re6 47.Rd4 Kg5 48.Rd7 Rc6 49.Kb4 Kf6 50.Rd4 Kg5 51.Rd8 Re6 52.Rc8 f4 53.exf4 Kxf4 54.Rxc7 Kf3 55.Rh7 Re4 56.Rh6 b5 57.axb5 axb5 58.Rf6+ Kg2 59.Kxb5 Re2 60.c5 Rb2+ 61.Ka6 Ra2+ 62.Kb7 Rb2+ 63.Rb6 Rc2 64.c6 Kxh3 65.c7 Kg2 66.Rc6 Rb2+ 67.Rb6 Rc2 68.f4 1–0

=== Game 15: Smyslov–Botvinnik, 1–0 ===
Caro–Kann Defense (ECO B12)
1.e4 c6 2.d4 d5 3.f3 e6 4.Nc3 Nf6 5.Bg5 h6 6.Bh4 Qb6 7.a3 c5 8.Nge2 Nc6 9.dxc5 Bxc5 10.Na4 Qa5+ 11.Nec3 Be7 12.Bxf6 Bxf6 13.exd5 Nd4 14.Bd3 exd5 15.0-0 0-0 16.f4 g6 17.Qe1 Bg7 18.Kh1 Bd7 19.b4 Qd8 20.Rd1 b6 21.Qf2 Be6 22.Ba6 Qf6 23.Rd2 Rad8 24.Nd1 Nf5 25.Nac3 d4 26.Ne4 Qe7 27.Bd3 a5 28.bxa5 bxa5 29.a4 Qb4 30.Re2 Bd5 31.Ng3 Nxg3+ 32.Qxg3 Rde8 33.Ref2 Bf6 34.Qh3 Kg7 35.Bb5 Re1 36.Qd3 Be4 37.Qb3 Rxf1+ 38.Rxf1 Qd2 39.Nf2 Ba8 40.Qd3 Qxf4 41.h3 h5 42.Qe2 Qe3 43.Qxe3 dxe3 44.Nd1 Rc8 45.Nxe3 Rc3 46.Bd3 Rc5 47.Nc4 Rg5 48.Rf2 Bc6 49.Nd6 Re5 50.Nc4 Rg5 51.Nd6 Rd5 52.Nb5 Re5 53.Re2 Rxe2 54.Bxe2 Be7 55.Kg1 1–0

=== Game 16: Botvinnik–Smyslov, ½–½ ===
English (ECO A16)
1.c4 Nf6 2.Nc3 d5 3.cxd5 Nxd5 4.g3 g6 5.Bg2 Nxc3 6.bxc3 Bg7 7.Rb1 Nd7 8.Nf3 0-0 9.0-0 e5 10.d4 c6 11.e4 Qa5 12.Qc2 exd4 13.cxd4 Nb6 14.Bd2 Qa4 15.Qxa4 Nxa4 16.Rfc1 Nb6 17.Be3 f5 18.Ne5 fxe4 19.Bxe4 Bf5 20.Bxf5 Rxf5 21.g4 Rff8 22.a4 Rae8 23.a5 Nd5 24.Rxb7 Nxe3 25.fxe3 Bxe5 26.dxe5 Rxe5 27.Rxc6 Rf7 28.a6 Rxe3 29.Rcc7 Re1+ 30.Kg2 Re2+ 31.Kg3 Re3+ 32.Kg2 Re2+ 33.Kg3 Re3+ 34.Kh4 Rxc7 35.Rxc7 h6 36.g5 h5 ½–½

=== Game 17: Smyslov–Botvinnik, 1/2 ===
Caro–Kann (ECO B10)
1.e4 c6 2.Nc3 d5 3.Nf3 dxe4 4.Nxe4 Nf6 5.Nxf6+ gxf6 6.Bc4 Bg7 7.h3 Bf5 8.0-0 e6 9.Re1 0-0 10.d4 Nd7 11.Bf4 Re8 12.Qd2 Bg6 13.c3 Nb6 14.Bb3 a5 15.a3 Nd5 16.Bh6 Qb6 17.Bxg7 Kxg7 18.Ba2 Rad8 19.c4 Ne7 20.Rad1 Qc7 21.Qc3 Bh5 22.Rd3 Bg6 23.Rd2 Rd7 24.Nh2 h5 25.Nf3 Red8 26.Red1 b6 27.Nh4 Nf5 28.Nxg6 fxg6 29.Bb1 c5 30.Bxf5 cxd4 31.Rxd4 Rxd4 32.Rxd4 Rxd4 33.Qxd4 gxf5 34.b4 axb4 35.axb4 Kf7 36.Kf1 Ke7 37.Ke2 Qb7 38.c5 Qa6+ 39.Qd3 Qa2+ 40.Kf3 Qa8+ 41.Kg3 bxc5 42.bxc5 h4 43.Kh2 Qb8+ 44.Kg1 Qc7 45.Qa3 Kf7 46.Qb4 Qc6 47.Qb6 Qe4 48.Qa5 Qb1+ 49.Kh2 Qb8+ ½–½

=== Game 18: Botvinnik–Smyslov, 1–0 ===
English (ECO A16)
1.c4 Nf6 2.Nc3 d5 3.cxd5 Nxd5 4.g3 g6 5.Bg2 Nxc3 6.bxc3 Bg7 7.Qb3 Nc6 8.Nf3 0-0 9.0-0 Na5 10.Qc2 c5 11.d3 Bf5 12.e4 Bd7 13.Bg5 Rc8 14.Qd2 Bb5 15.Rfd1 Ba4 16.Re1 f6 17.Bh6 Bxh6 18.Qxh6 Qxd3 19.e5 Nc6 20.Re3 Qc2 21.exf6 exf6 22.Rae1 Rcd8 23.Bh3 Ne5 24.Nxe5 fxe5 25.f4 Bc6 26.Qg5 Rde8 27.Rxe5 Qxc3 28.Rxe8 Bxe8 29.Qe5 Qxe5 30.Rxe5 b6 31.Re7 a5 32.Rb7 Rf6 33.Rb8 Kf7 34.Kf2 Rd6 35.Ke3 Ba4 36.Rb7+ Kg8 37.Rb8+ Kg7 38.Rb7+ Kg8 39.Rb8+ Kf7 40.Rb7+ Kf8 41.Rxh7 c4 42.Rc7 b5 43.Ke4 b4 44.Rxc4 Rd2 45.Ke5 Rxa2 46.Rc8+ Be8 47.Bd7 Re2+ 48.Kf6 g5 49.fxg5 Rf2+ 50.Ke5+ Re2+ 51.Kf4 b3 52.Rb8 b2 53.Bxe8 Rxe8 54.Rxb2 a4 55.Ra2 Ra8 56.Ra3 Kf7 57.h4 Kg6 58.Ke4 Kh5 59.Kd4 Rd8+ 60.Kc4 Re8 61.Kd5 Rd8+ 62.Ke5 Ra8 63.Kd5 Rd8+ 64.Kc5 Rb8 65.Rxa4 Rb3 66.Kd6 Rxg3 67.Ke7 Rb3 68.Ra6 Rb7+ 69.Kf6 Rb4 70.Rd6 Ra4 71.Re6 Rb4 72.Kf7 Rb7+ 73.Re7 Rb4 74.Kg7 1–0

=== Game 19: Smyslov–Botvinnik, 1–0 ===
Caro–Kann, Two Knights (ECO B11)
1.e4 c6 2.Nc3 d5 3.Nf3 Bg4 4.h3 Bxf3 5.Qxf3 Nf6 6.d3 e6 7.a3 Be7 8.g4 Nfd7 9.d4 Nf8 10.Be3 Ng6 11.Qg3 Bh4 12.Qh2 Nd7 13.0-0-0 Qb8 14.f4 dxe4 15.Nxe4 Nf6 16.Nxf6+ Bxf6 17.Qf2 Bh4 18.Qf3 Ne7 19.Bd3 g6 20.f5 exf5 21.Bf4 Qd8 22.gxf5 Qd5 23.Qg4 Bf6 24.Rhe1 h5 25.Qg3 h4 26.Qg4 gxf5 27.Bxf5 Kf8 28.Be4 Qa2 29.c3 Rd8 30.Rf1 Nd5 31.Bd2 Rd6 32.Qc8+ Ke7 33.Qxb7+ Rd7 34.Rde1 Qa1+ 35.Bb1 1–0

=== Game 20: Botvinnik–Smyslov, ½–½ ===
English, Symmetrical (ECO A30)
1.c4 c5 2.Nf3 f5 3.d4 cxd4 4.Nxd4 g6 5.g3 Bg7 6.Bg2 Nc6 7.Nb5 Nf6 8.N5c3 0-0 9.0-0 b6 10.b3 Bb7 11.Bb2 Rf7 12.Qd2 Qf8 13.Na3 Rd8 14.Rad1 Na5 15.Bxb7 Nxb7 16.Nab5 a6 17.Nd4 Bh6 18.Qc2 f4 19.Nf3 d6 20.Nd4 Ra8 21.Nd5 Nxd5 22.cxd5 Rc8 23.Qb1 Qe8 24.Ba3 Nd8 25.Qe4 Qd7 26.Kg2 Qg4 27.f3 Qh5 28.Ne6 Qf5 29.Nd4 Qxe4 30.fxe4 fxg3 31.Rxf7 Kxf7 32.hxg3 Bg7 33.Bb2 b5 34.Rd2 Ke8 35.Kf2 Kd7 36.Nf3 Bxb2 37.Rxb2 Nf7 38.Ke3 Rc3+ 39.Kd2 b4 40.Rb1 h5 41.a3 a5 42.axb4 axb4 43.Ra1 Nh6 44.Ra7+ Ke8 45.Ra8+ Kf7 46.e5 dxe5 47.Ng5+ Kg7 48.Ne6+ ½–½

=== Game 21: Smyslov–Botvinnik, ½–½ ===
Sicilian (ECO B32)
1.e4 c5 2.Nf3 Nc6 3.d4 cxd4 4.Nxd4 Nf6 5.Nc3 g6 6.Nxc6 dxc6 7.Qxd8+ Kxd8 8.Bc4 Ke8 9.a4 e5 10.f4 Be6 11.Bxe6 fxe6 12.Rf1 Bh6 13.f5 Bxc1 14.Rxc1 Ke7 15.Rd1 gxf5 16.exf5 Rad8 17.Rxd8 Rxd8 18.b3 Rg8 19.g3 h5 20.fxe6 Kxe6 21.Rf2 h4 22.gxh4 Rh8 23.Nd1 ½–½

=== Game 22: Botvinnik–Smyslov, 0–1 ===
Dutch, Stonewall (ECO A95)
1.d4 f5 2.g3 Nf6 3.Bg2 e6 4.Nf3 Be7 5.0-0 0-0 6.c4 c6 7.Nc3 d5 8.Bg5 Nbd7 9.e3 Qe8 10.Qc2 Kh8 11.Ne2 h6 12.Bxf6 Bxf6 13.cxd5 exd5 14.Nf4 g5 15.Nd3 Rg8 16.Qc3 Be7 17.Nfe5 Nf6 18.f3 Be6 19.Nc5 Bxc5 20.Qxc5 Nd7 21.Nxd7 Qxd7 22.Rae1 Rg7 23.Rf2 b6 24.Qc3 Qd6 25.Rc2 Bd7 26.b4 h5 27.Kh1 h4 28.gxh4 gxh4 29.f4 Rag8 30.Bf3 Be8 31.Qd2 Qh6 32.Qe2 h3 33.Rcc1 Rg2 34.Bxg2 Rxg2 35.Qf3 Qh4 36.b5 Bh5 37.Qxg2 hxg2 38.Kg1 c5 0–1

=== Game 23: Smyslov–Botvinnik, ½–½ ===
Reti Opening (ECO A05)
1.Nf3 Nf6 2.g3 g6 3.b4 b6 4.Bb2 Bb7 5.Na3 Bg7 6.Bg2 0-0 7.0-0 d6 8.c4 c5 9.Nc2 Qc7 10.d3 Nbd7 11.e4 e6 12.Ne3 Ng4 13.Bxg7 Nxe3 14.fxe3 Kxg7 15.Ng5 Rae8 16.a3 d5 17.bxc5 bxc5 18.Qb3 d4 19.exd4 cxd4 20.c5 h6 21.Nf3 e5 22.Rac1 Bc6 23.Nh4 Rb8 24.Qd1 Qd8 25.Bh3 Nf6 26.Nf3 Qe7 27.Qc2 Rb7 28.Nd2 Rc7 29.Qc4 Nh7 30.Nf3 Rb8 31.Rf2 Ng5 32.Nxg5 hxg5 33.a4 Be8 34.Bg4 a5 35.Bd1 Rbc8 36.Rfc2 Bd7 37.Be2 Kg8 38.Kg2 Kg7 39.Kg1 Kf8 40.Bd1 Kg8 41.Qb3 ½–½

Smyslov said of his many battles against Botvinnik;

I have the feeling that all my life I have been playing only against Botvinnik. I am happy to have played almost a hundred games against such a remarkable player. We were both in our prime, and I think that the creative results of our meetings played a far from minor role in the development of chess thinking.
