= 2007 in chess =

Below is a list of events in chess during the year 2007:

== Events ==
(Top events in bold)

=== January ===
- **January 1** – Veselin Topalov (Bulgaria) lost 30 rating points but still tops the FIDE rating list at 2783. Viswanathan Anand (India) is second at 2779 and Vladimir Kramnik (Russia) is third at 2766. There is only one change in the players in the top eleven: Peter Svidler (Russia) dropped from number 4 to number 12 with Shakhriyar Mamedyarov (Azerbaijan) jumping from 12 to 4. At number 13 and rated 2727, Judit Polgár (Hungary) is the only woman in the top 100. Top juniors are Teimour Radjabov (Azerbaijan, number 11 at 2729), Magnus Carlsen (Norway, number 24 at 2690), and Sergey Karjakin (Ukraine, number 29 at 2678). Viktor Korchnoi (Switzerland) reenters the world top 100 at age 74, earning the 85th position with a rating of 2629.
- **January 5** – David Howell, age 16 years 1 month, becomes the youngest British Grandmaster ever. His second-place finish at the Rilton Cup in Stockholm with the score 7/9 gives him his third grandmaster norm and a rating of 2501.
- January 7 – 82nd Hastings International Congress 2006/7 won by GM Merab Gagunashvili (Georgia) and GM Valerij Neverov (Ukraine).
- January 7 – 49th Reggio Emilia won by GM Viorel Iordăchescu (Moldava).
- January 8 – 1st ACP World Rapid Cup in Odesa won by Peter Leko (Hungary) over Vassily Ivanchuk (Ukraine) by 2½–1½ in the final.
- January 9 – 2006/7 Australian Open Championships in Canberra won by IM Zong-Yuan Zhao (Australia). GM Ian Rogers (Australia) is 2nd, and Darryl Johansen (Australia) and GM Mark Bluvshtein (Canada) are 3rd=.
- January 11 – Moscow-London "Ice Chess" exhibition game is played by satellite link on large outdoor boards in Moscow and London with giant pieces sculpted of ice in the shapes of local landmarks. Anatoly Karpov (Russia) and Nigel Short (England) serve as honorary captains with eight-year-old Russian and English chess prodigies choosing the moves. The game is agreed drawn after about an hour of play, with the pieces melting due to temperatures above freezing in both cities.
- January 12 – Paul Keres Memorial Tournament in Tallinn "A Group" won by Georgy Timoshenko (Ukraine).
- January 12 – 114th New Zealand Championship in Wanganui won by 16-year-old FM Puchen Wang.
- January 15 – 32nd Ciudad de Sevilla won by GM Karel van der Weide (Netherlands) on tie-break over GM Daniel Cámpora (Argentina).
- January 20 – Belarus Championship in Minsk won by GM Aleksej Aleksandrov.
- January 26 – 67th Armenian Championship in Yerevan won by GM Karen Asrian in a playoff with GM Tigran Kotanjian.
- January 27 – German Championship in Bad Koenigshofen won by GM Arkadij Naiditsch on tie-break over IM Rainer Buhmann.
- January 27 – Estonian Championship in Tallinn won by GM Meelis Kanep after a playoff against GM Kaido Kulaots. WIM Tatyana Fomina won the women's title after a three-way playoff.
- **January 28** – Wijk aan Zee is a three-way tie between GM Levon Aronian (Armenia), Veselin Topalov (Bulgaria), and Teimour Radjabov (Azerbaijan).
- January 31 – Cuban Chess Championship in Santa Clara won by Lázaro Bruzón.

=== February ===
- February 4 – Moscow Open won by GM Evgeniy Najer on tie-break over GM Vasily Yemelin in a field of 245 players.
- February 11 – Fenach Chilean Championship in Santiago won by Eduardo Arancibia on tie-break over IM Luis Rojas. (Chile has two chess federations. Fenach is the longer established of the two.)
- February 16 – Czech Championship in Prague won by GM Tomas Polak.
- February 20 – Brazilian Women's Championship in Americana won by Suzana Chang.
- February 22 – 6th Aeroflot Open in Moscow won by GM Evgeny Alekseev in a field of 88, including 73 GMs, 11 IMs, 2 WGMs, and 1 WFM.
- February 22 – Polish Championship in Opole won by GM Tomasz Markowski.
- February 25 – Romanian Chess Championship in Amara won by GM Constantin Lupulescu.

=== March ===
- March 10 – 125th Varsity Match between Cambridge and Oxford (the world's oldest regular chess event) is won by Cambridge in an upset.
- **March 11** – Morelia/Linares won by GM Viswanathan Anand (India), with GM Magnus Carlsen (Norway) and GM Alexander Morozevich (Russia) 2nd=.
- March 11 – Finnish Team Championship won for the first time by OpusCapita from Tampere. Matinkylä placed second for the fourth consecutive time.
- March 11 – Austrian Team Championship in Mattersburg won by Union Ansfelden.
- March 11 – Norwegian League championship in Oslo won by Oslo Schakselskap.
- March 13 – 64th Georgian Women's Championship in Tbilisi won by IM Lela Javakhishvili in a playoff against WGM Sopiko Khukhashvili.
- March 14 – Turkish Championship in Ankara won by GM Suat Atalık.
- March 17 – Serbian Championship in Vršac.
- March 18 – Polish Women's Championship in Barlinek won by IM Iweta Rajlich.
- March 20 – 71st Bulgarian Championship in Pernik won by GM Boris Chatalbashev. WGM Margarita Voiska won the women's championship.
- March 24 – 8th Internet Chess Tournament "Ciudad de Dos Hermanas" (Internet Chess Club) won by Jorge Sammour-Hasbun.
- March 24 – Belgian League won by CRELEL Liège. Also qualifying for the European Team Championships are Namur finishing second and Rochade finishing third.
- March 25 – 66th Georgian Championship in Tbilisi won by GM Baadur Jobava.
- **March 29** – 16th Amber Blindfold and Rapid in Monaco won by GM Vladimir Kramnik (Russia) by two points, winning the blindfold event with 9/11 and finishing 2nd= in the rapid.
- March 30 – Kazakhstani Championship in Astana won by GM Darmen Sadvakasov.

=== April ===
- **April 1** – With an Elo rating of 2786, GM Viswanathan Anand (India) becomes the sixth player to top the FIDE rating list since its inception in 1970. The April list drops former number one Veselin Topalov (Bulgaria) to number two at 2772. Vladimir Kramnik (Russia) remains at number three also at 2772. Alexander Morozevich (GM) rises to a career high fourth in the world at 2762. A rating of 2623 is required to make the top 100.
- April 1 – Bundesliga in Muelheim won by the OSC Baden Baden team featuring Viswanathan Anand (India), Peter Svidler (Russia), Alexei Shirov (Spain), and Magnus Carlsen (Norway). Hamburger SK finishes second and SG Köln Porz third.
- April 7 – 38th Mar del Plata Open won by GM Andres Rodríguez (Uruguay).
- April 8 – Villa de Canada de Calatrava rapid g/25 won by GM Alexei Shirov (Spain) on progressive score over GM Daniel Fridman (Latvia), GM Ivan Sokolov (Netherlands), and Boris Gelfand (Israel), all at 7½/9.
- April 8 – Danish Championship in Aalborg won by GM Sune Berg Hansen.
- April 9 – 45th Doeberl Cup in Canberra won by GM Ian Rogers (New South Wales) for the eleventh time.
- April 15 – "Chess Legends" Lajos Portisch (Hungary) and Boris Spassky (France) draw a six-game rapid match in Heviz, Hungary, both players winning one game and drawing four.
- April 15 – 33rd Bangladeshi Championship in Dhaka won by IM Abdulla Al Rakib.
- April 16 – 8th European Individual Championship in Dresden won by GM Vladislav Tkachiev (France) after playoff matches to break a several way tie for first. IM Tatiana Kosintseva (Russia) won the women's championship outright by two points.
- April 22 – Italian Team Championship in Palermo won by Vimar Marostica for the seventh time.
- April 24 – Moscow Championship won by GM Vladimir Belov on tie-break over GM Boris Grachev.
- April 28 – Ukrainian Team Championship in Alushta won by Keystone.
- April 29 – Peter Leko – Vladimir Kramnik rapid match in Miskolc won by Kramnik 4½–3½.

=== May ===
- May 1 – Lugano Open finishes in a four-way tie for first between Robert Zelcic, Joseph Gallagher, Nenad Sulava, and Michele Godena.
- May 6 – World Cup holder Levon Aronian (Armenia) defeats World Champion Vladimir Kramnik (Russia) 4–2 in a six-game rapid match held in Yerevan.
- May 6 – Chinese Zonal 3.5 in Shandong won by GM Bu Xiangzhi.
- May 7 – 4NCL won by Guildford-ADC 1 with a perfect record of 11/11 ahead of Guildford-ADC 2 at 10.
- May 12 – Russian Team Championship won by Tomsk 400 (Alexander Morozevich, Dmitry Jakovenko, Sergey Karjakin, Rustam Kasimdzhanov, Ernesto Inarkiev, Vladislav Tkachiev, Victor Bologan, and Pavel Smirnov) with a perfect 9/9 score.
- May 12 – Baku Chess Festival won by GM Arkadij Naiditsch (Germany) over a field of 147. Naiditsch scores 7½/9 after a last round victory as Black over top seed GM Nigel Short (England).
- May 13 – 74th Lithuanian Championship in Šiauliai won by GM Šarūnas Šulskis with 8/11.
- May 16 – Mitropa Cup in Szeged men's winner is France, women's winner is Hungary.
- **May 17** – 2006 Chess Oscar won by Vladimir Kramnik (Russia). Veselin Topalov (Hungary) and Viswanathan Anand (India) finished second and third.
- **May 20** – 3rd M-Tel Masters in Sofia won by GM Veselin Topalov (Bulgaria), his third consecutive victory in the event.
- May 21 – 16th Croatian Team Cup in Šibenik won by Lapor-Mladost, Zagreb (GM Zdenko Kožul, GM Adrian Mikhalchishin, GM Krunoslav Hulak, GM Georg Mohr).
- May 23 – U.S. Championship in Stillwater won by GM Alexander Shabalov.
- May 23 – Uzbek Championship in Tashkent finished in a three-way tie for first at 9½/13 between IM Vladimir Egin, IM Anton Filippov, and GM Timur Gareev.
- May 27 – 2007 Candidates round one matches begin.
- May 27 – 50th Serbia Team Cup in Mataruška Banja won by VSK Sveti Nikolaj.
- May 28 – 37th Bosna in Sarajevo six-player category 17 double round-robin top section won by Sergei Movsesian.
- May 29 – 42nd Capablanca Memorial in Havana elite section (ten GM single round-robin, category 15) won by GM Vassily Ivanchuk (Ukraine) 7½/10, two points ahead of the field.
- May 30 – 1st World Women's Team Championship in Ekaterinburg won by China with 17 points, ahead of Russia at 15 and Armenia at 14. Teams from ten national Federations participated.

=== June ===
- **June 3** – 2007 Candidates Matches, final games of round one played. Levon Aronian (Armenia), Peter Leko (Hungary), Sergei Rublevsky (Russia), Boris Gelfand (Israel), Gata Kamsky (USA), Alexander Grischuk (Russia), Evgeny Bareev (Russia), and Alexei Shirov (Spain) advance.
- June 3 – French Team Championship in Clichy won by Clichy over Cannes and Paris Chess 15.
- June 8 – St Petersburg Championship won by GM Marat Makarov on tie-break over IM Pavel Anisimov and Maxim Matlakov all at 6½/11.
- June 10 – 7th European Individual Senior Championship in Hockenheim overall (men's) winner GM Nukhim Rashkovsky (Russia) on tie-break over IM Algiman Butnorius (Lithuania) both with 7½/9, women's winner Elena Fatalibekova (Russia).
- June 10 – Bosnian Team Championships won by SK Zeljeznièar, Sarajevo (Robert Ruck, Zoltán Ribli etc.) over the favorites SK Bosna, Sarajevo (Zoltán Almási, Ivan Sokolov, Nigel Short, Sergei Movsesian, Borki Predojević, Suat Atalık etc.).
- June 10 – Uruguayan Championship at Montevideo won by IM Bernardo Roselli Mailhe for the 12th time on tie-break over FM Manuel Larrea.
- June 11 – National Open in Las Vegas won by GM Hikaru Nakamura (USA) with 5½/6. GM Viktor Korchnoi (Switzerland) is part of a six-way tie for second at 5.
- **June 13** – 2007 Candidates final games of round 2 played. Levon Aronian (Armenia), Peter Leko (Hungary), Alexander Grischuk (Russia), and Boris Gelfand (Israel) advance, qualifying for the 2007 World Championship tournament in Mexico City in September.
- June 18 – 5th World Computer Championship in Amsterdam won by Rybka.
- June 20 – Colombian Championship in Cartagena de Indias won by IM Alder Escobar Forero, the women's event won by Martha Mateus.
- June 24 – 3rd European Union Individual Championship in Arvier won by GM Nikola Sedlak (Serbia) on tie-break over GM Michele Godena (Italy), both scoring 8/10 in a field of 110.
- June 28 – Dutch Championship in Hilversum won by GM Sergei Tiviakov in a rapid playoff over GM Daniël Stellwagen after both scored 8/11. GM Peng Zhaoqin won the women's title with 8/9.
- June 30 – Aerosvit tournament in Foros (12 GMs, category 18) won by GM Vassily Ivanchuk (Ukraine) with 7½/11. GM Sergey Karjakin (Ukraine) placed second at 7.

=== July ===
- **July 1** – The top three players on the FIDE rating list remain the same: Viswanathan Anand (India), Veselin Topalov (Bulgaria), and Vladimir Kramnik. Vassily Ivanchuk gains 33 points to move up to number 4 from number 12. A rating of 2624 is required to make the top 100.
- **July 1** – Dortmund Sparkassen won by GM Vladimir Kramnik (Russia). Kramnik scored 5/7, a full point ahead of the field of eight GMs in this category 20 single round-robin. This is Kramnik's eight victory in this event since 1995.
- July 8 – Belgian Championship in Namur won by GM Alexandre Dgebuadze with 6½/9.
- July 8 – Irish Championship in Dublin won by IM Brian Kelly and FM Stephen Brady with 6½/9 finishing as part of a four-way tie for 3rd–6th. The field of 52 included several foreign players who were not eligible for the title, including 4 GMs.
- July 8 – GM Ian Rogers retires from competitive chess after winning the Lidums Checkmate Open. He had been the top Australian player for more than twenty years.
- July 9 – 20th Ciudad de Léon rapid tournament won by GM Viswanathan Anand (India), beating GM Veselin Topalov 3–1 in the final.
- July 15 – Fabiano Caruana becomes the youngest ever Grandmaster in the history of both the United States and Italy surpassing the prior record of Hikaru Nakamura.
- July 15 – Canadian Open in Ottawa won by GM Bu Xiangzhi (China) with 8/10 in a field of 280 players.
- July 15 – Slovak Championship in Banska Stiavnica won by GM Sergei Movsesian with 7½/9.
- July 15 – Swedish Championship in Stockholm won by GM Tiger Hillarp Persson with 9/13.
- July 15 – Scottish Championship in Cumbernauld won by FM Andrew Muir with 8/9.
- July 20 – U.S. Women's Championship in Stillwater, Oklahoma won by IM Irina Krush with 7/9. Krush had also won the title in 1998.
- July 22 – Montenegro Championship in Cetinje won by GM Dragisa Blagojevic with 8½/11.
- July 22 – World Computer Rapid Championship on ICC won by Rybka with 13/14.
- July 28 – 8th Montreal International won by GM Vassily Ivanchuk (Ukraine) with 7/9.
- July 28 – Montenegro Women's Championship in Cetinje won by WFM Aleksandra Mijovic with 7½/8.
- July 29 – 29th Politiken Cup in Copenhagen won by GM Michał Krasenkow (Poland) on tie-break over GM Emanuel Berg (Sweden), GM Gabriel Sargissian (Armenia), GM Nick de Firmian (USA), and GM Vladimir Malakhov (Russia) after they all finished on 8/10.

=== August ===
- August 3 – 40th Biel Festival
- August 5 – Baltic Sea Cup in Bornholm
- August 11 – 94th British Championship in Great Yarmouth
- August 18 – 5th Staunton Memorial at Simpson's-in-the-Strand, London, features six British and six Dutch players (11 GMs, 1 WGM, category 13) in a single round-robin. GM Michael Adams (England) is the individual winner with 8½/11. The Dutch players compile a higher total score: Netherlands 38, UK 28.

=== September ===
- **September 30** – Viswanathan Anand becomes the new World Champion by winning the eight-player, double round-robin 2007 World Championship tournament in Mexico City.

=== November ===
- November 29 – World Youth Championships in Antalya

=== December ===
- December 4 – 66th Italian Championship in Cremona
- December 10 – Commonwealth Championship in New Delhi won by GM G. B. Ramesh (India) on tie-break over GM Ganguly Surya Shekhar (India). The women's champion is IM Dronavalli Harika (India) who finished seventh overall. Indian players win 44 of the 45 medals awarded at the tournament.
- December 16 – 91st Marshall Chess Club Championship won by GM Jaan Ehlvest (USA) for the fourth time, 6½/9.
- **December 30** – 2007 World Cup in Khanty-Mansiysk won by GM Gata Kamsky (USA). As the winner of this 128-player single-elimination tournament, Kamsky will play former world champion GM Veselin Topalov (Bulgaria) for the right to play in the 2010 World Championship match.

== Deaths ==
- January 17 – Rodrigo Flores (1913–2007), 93, eleven-time Chilean champion.
- May 21 – Alexander Roshal (1936–2007), 70, Russian chess journalist, editor of 64-Chess Review, responsible for restoration of the Chess Oscar as an annual award.
- June 8 – Fenny Heemskerk (1919–2007), 87, ten-time Dutch Ladies' Champion.
- July 1 – Maxim Sorokin (1968–2007), 38, Russian Grandmaster.
- November 27 – IM Svein Johannessen (1937–2007), 70. Norwegian Champion 1959, 1962, 1970 and 1973.
