= Ashot Nadanian =

Armenian chess player and coach (born 1972)

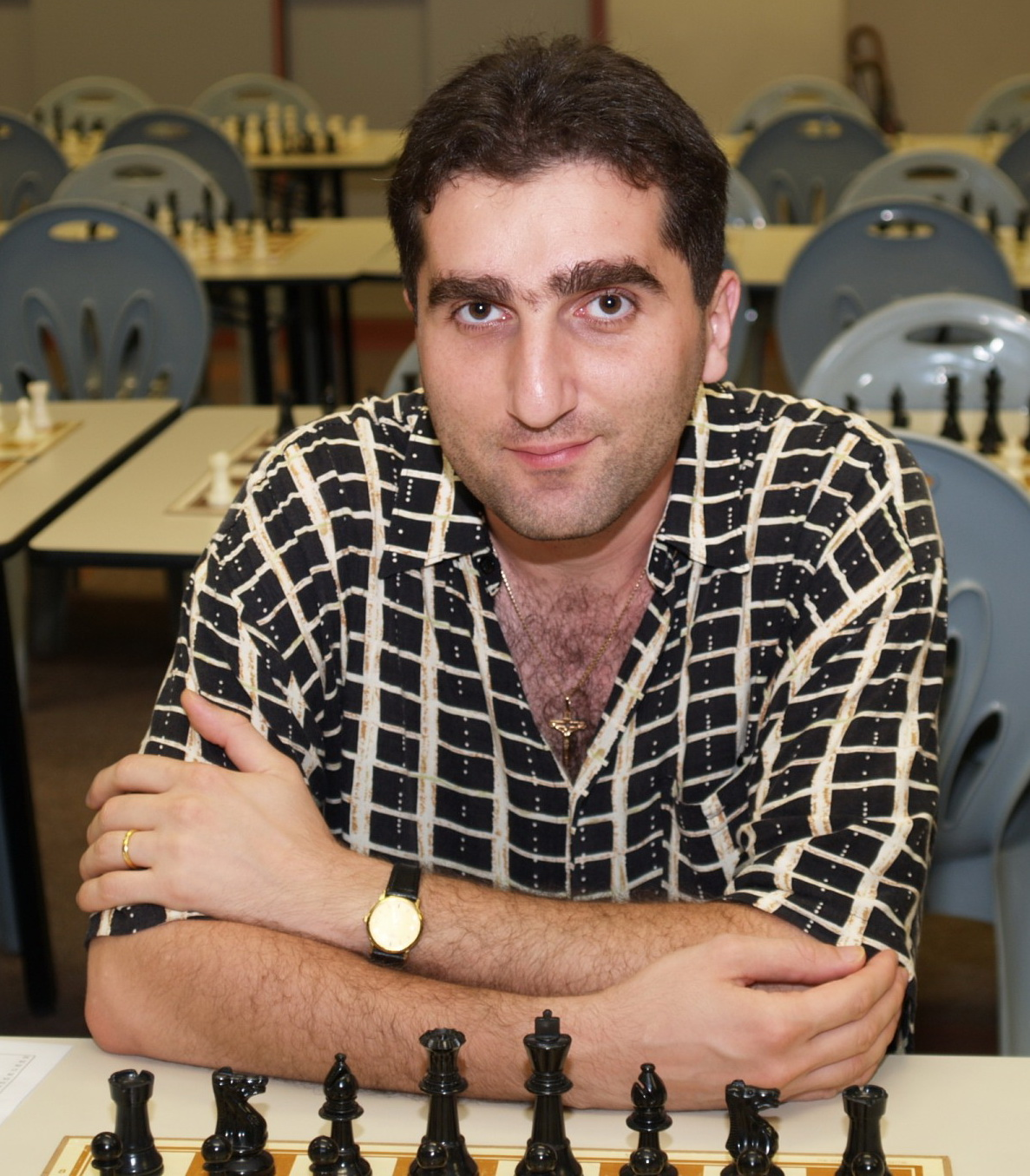
- Nadanian in 2007

Personal information
- Born: Ashot Gevorgi Nadanian; 19 September 1972 (age 54) Baku, Azerbaijan SSR, Soviet Union

Chess career
- Country: Armenia
- Title: International Master (1997)
- Peak rating: 2475 (July 1997)

Ashot Nadanian (sometimes transliterated as Nadanyan; Armenian: Աշոտ Նադանեան; born 19 September 1972) is an Armenian chess International Master (1997), chess theoretician and chess coach.

His highest achievements have been in opening theory and coaching. Two opening variations are named after him: the Nadanian Variation in the Grünfeld Defence and the Nadanian Attack in the Queen's Pawn Opening. He began coaching at the age of 22 and has brought up three grandmasters. He has coached the national teams of Kuwait and Singapore and was awarded the titles Honoured Coach of Armenia in 1998 and FIDE Senior Trainer in 2017. Since 2011, he has been a permanent second of Levon Aronian.

Although a strong player who competed in the 1996 Chess Olympiad and narrowly failed to qualify for the 1999 FIDE World Chess Championship, he has never fulfilled his potential. According to Valery Chekhov, Nadanian "possesses enormous chess potential, but he was not able to find enough time to work professionally on his chess." Levon Aronian said that due to the situation in Armenia, Nadanian "was not able to display even one-tenth of his playing talent."

Due to his imaginative attacking style, Nadanian has been described as a "chess artist", a "brilliant eccentric", the "Armenian Tal" and "Kasparov's half-brother". The sixth chapter of Tibor Karolyi's 2009 book Genius in the Background is devoted to Nadanian.

== Early years ==
Nadanian was born on 19 September 1972 in Baku, Azerbaijan SSR, which then was part of the Soviet Union, to Sergei and Irina, both hairdressers. He was taught to play chess by his father when he was seven. His early coach was Rafael Sarkisov, who took him on as a pupil at Spartak in Baku. In his article The Voiceless Old Man Nadanian recollects, that when he was nine or ten, there were almost no chess tournaments in which young players could play with seniors, and therefore he often went to the park near his house to play chess with older chess lovers. He remembers that in one of these park-battles he played against a mysterious, silent stranger who turned out to be the highly respected chess champion Vladimir Makogonov. In 1986 and 1987 Nadanian won the under-sixteen Azerbaijani championship. With the beginning of the First Nagorno-Karabakh War in 1988, his family was forced to leave Baku and flee to Armenia.

== Chess career ==
Nadanian played in the Soviet Union Junior Chess Championships of 1987, 1988 and 1989, in the Armenian Chess Championships of 1997, 1998 and 1999 (7th–8th places), in the 32nd Chess Olympiad in Yerevan 1996, in the 13th European Chess Club Cup 1997, in the Zonal tournament in Panormo 1998, where he shared 7th–11th places out of 72 participants, in the European Individual Chess Championships of 2000 and 2014 and in the FIDE World Rapid and Blitz Championships 2013 in Khanty-Mansiysk. In 2014, playing board 4, he helped his team BKMA Yerevan to a silver medal in the Armenian Team Chess Championship.

His other performances:

- Częstochowa Open, Poland, 1992: 1st–2nd;
- Tbilisi Open, Georgia, 1996: 1st;
- Pasanauri Open, Georgia, 1997: 1st–2nd;
- New York City Open Championship (Tournament B), United States, 1998: 4th–7th;
- Aeroflot Open (Tournament A), Moscow, Russia, 2002: 35th;
- Estrin Memorial, Moscow, Russia, 2002: 5th;
- Aeroflot Open (Tournament B), Moscow, Russia, 2004: 5th–15th;
- Goldberg Memorial, Moscow, Russia, 2004: 2nd–3rd;
- IGB Dato Arthur Tan Malaysia Open, Kuala Lumpur, Malaysia, 2006: 6th–10th;
- ASEAN Masters Circuit GMB, Tarakan, Indonesia, 2008: 2nd–3rd;
- IGB Dato Arthur Tan Malaysia Open, Kuala Lumpur, Malaysia, 2008: 3rd–7th;
- Korea Open chess tournament, Seoul, South Korea, 2008: 6th–10th;
- Singapore Rapid Chess Championship, Singapore, 2010: 2nd;
- Yerevan City Chess Championship, Armenia, 2011: 2nd–4th;
- Karen Asrian Memorial, Jermuk, Armenia, 2011: 7th–13th;
- Andranik Margaryan Memorial, Yerevan, Armenia, 2012: 2nd–4th;
- Armenian Rapid Chess Championship, Yerevan, Armenia, 2012: 7th–10th;
- Batumi Municipality Cup, Batumi, Georgia, 2016: 5th–8th;
- Armenian Rapid Chess Championship, Yerevan, Armenia, 2017: 6th–11th.

== Playing strength and style ==
Nadanian reached his best Elo rating in July 1997 with 2475 Elo points. His best single performance was at Moscow Aeroflot Open, 2002, where he scored five of nine possible points (56%), exceeding his first grandmaster norm by half a point. His second norm came at Moscow 2004, where he scored eight points out of eleven with a performance rating of 2630. His United States Chess Federation (USCF) rating, based on nine games from 1998 New York Open, is 2655.

Nadanian has an imaginative and adventurous style of playing, and even his mistakes, according to Tibor Karolyi, "contain elements of creativity". He likes to create fresh, atypical positions straight from the opening, often employing bizarre maneuvers to achieve his goals. Uncommon chess openings have always been a part of his repertoire (e.g. Sokolsky Opening, Budapest Gambit).

Kingpin magazine called him "a brilliant eccentric". Tibor Karolyi devoted a chapter to him in his 2009 book Genius in the Background and jokingly called him "Kasparov's Half-Brother", as Kasparov and Nadanian were both coached by Alexander Shakarov, and there were similarities in their playing styles. In particular, Karolyi emphasizes their ability to implement effective ideas on the edge of the board, attributing this to the influence of their common chess "father". As an example of flank pawn advances versus a solid centre, John L. Watson in his 2003 book Chess Strategy in Action brings attention to the game Nadanian – Ponomariov, Kyiv 1997 and calls it "almost satire on rule-breaking", as nine of White's first thirteen moves have been pawn moves and only one of those has been with a central pawn, yet Black's position was extremely difficult.

The 2005 World Cup winner Levon Aronian said of Nadanian: "His passion for beauty, his devotion to the romantic chess school has always been inspiring." Grandmaster Valery Chekhov noted that "along with his positive qualities like very subtle understanding of dynamic positions, very good sense of initiative and quick thinking, Ashot’s play has a few negative facets like weak opening repertoire, bad defence, and the psychological element of the game as well."

Mark Dvoretsky in his book Chess Lessons: Solving Problems & Avoiding Mistakes wrote: "Ashot Nadanian is a multi-talented man, and I have read his book Moyi Shakmaty (My Chess) with great pleasure. He is an interesting player, and an informative and objective commentator, and his writing style is "savory". While demonstrating his best games and unexpected and spectacular ideas he has carried over the board, Nadanian never tries to convince us that all his novelties are impeccably correct and supplies his readers with the results of an objective analysis."

== Chess theoretician ==
Grünfeld Defence
Nadanian Variation

Position: a8 black rook, b8 black knight, c8 black bishop, d8 black queen, e8 black king, f8 black bishop, h8 black rook, a7 black pawn, b7 black pawn, c7 black pawn, e7 black pawn, f7 black pawn, h7 black pawn, g6 black pawn, d5 black knight, a4 white knight, d4 white pawn, a2 white pawn, b2 white pawn, e2 white pawn, f2 white pawn, g2 white pawn, h2 white pawn, a1 white rook, c1 white bishop, d1 white queen, e1 white king, f1 white bishop, g1 white knight, h1 white rook

1.d4 Nf6 2.c4 g6 3.Nc3 d5 4.cxd5 Nxd5 5.Na4

Nadanian has contributions to opening theory, with two variations named after him: the Nadanian Variation in the Grünfeld Defence (after the moves 1.d4 Nf6 2.c4 g6 3.Nc3 d5 4.cxd5 Nxd5 5.Na4) and the Nadanian Attack in the Queen's Pawn Opening (after the moves 1.d4 Nf6 2.Nf3 h6 3.c4 g5). The first variation has been used by many strong GMs such as Viktor Korchnoi, Maxime Vachier-Lagrave, Bu Xiangzhi, Alexander Riazantsev, Walter Browne, Smbat Lputian, Jonathan Rowson, Andrei Kharlov, Bogdan Lalić, Igor Lysyj, while the second has never enjoyed popularity among top-flight players.

Described by John Donaldson as "the ever inventive creator of novelties", he has made a number of other notable innovations, including:

- 1.d4 d5 2.c4 e6 3.Nc3 Be7 4.Nf3 Nf6 5.Bf4 0–0 6.e3 c5 7.dxc5 Bxc5 8.Qc2 Nc6 9.a3 Qa5 10.Ra2;
- 1.d4 Nf6 2.c4 e6 3.Nf3 b6 4.g3 Ba6 5.b3 Bb4+ 6.Bd2 Be7 7.Bg2 c6 8.Bc3 d5 9.Ne5 Nfd7 10.Nd3;
- 1.c4 e5 2.Nc3 Nf6 3.Nf3 Nc6 4.g3 e4 5.Ng5 Ng4;
- 1.Nf3 c5 2.c4 Nc6 3.Nc3 e5 4.e3 Nf6 5.d4 e4 6.d5 exf3 7.dxc6 bxc6 8.e4. Aronian, who played this novelty against Caruana in Stavanger 2012 and won a pawn on move 19, said after the game: "This is a move that my second Ashot Nadanian has invented."

Nadanian has contributed analysis to many chess publications throughout the world including the Chess Informant, New In Chess Yearbook, Europe Échecs, 64, Kaissiber and Szachy Chess. He was a columnist for the Chessville.com website and has also written for ChessBase and the Armenian Chess Academy website.

According to Russian grandmaster Igor Zaitsev, Nadanian is "one of the most profound opening researchers".

== Chess coach and second ==
After Nadanian graduated from the Armenian State Institute of Physical Culture in 1994, he became a chess trainer. At 26 he became the youngest Honoured Coach of Armenia. Among his students are Grandmasters Gabriel Sargissian, Varuzhan Akobian and Davit G. Petrosian. He has also occasionally helped GM Tigran L. Petrosian.

"Ashot played an important role in shaping me as a chess player – and not only in that. The level of my play had fallen back considerably when I started to train with him in 1997. I think back with a smile on my face how impatiently after the first lesson I waited for the next session. I got the impression that I had rediscovered our game. Ashot is a born trainer."

— Gabriel Sargissian, twice Olympic gold medalist.

From December 1999 until August 2001, Nadanian worked as the National Team Coach of Kuwait. Between 2005 and 2010, he was the National Coach of Singapore Men's Team. There he also coached Daniel Fernandez, who later became a grandmaster.

In 2007, Nadanian received the title of FIDE Trainer. In 2017, he was awarded the title of FIDE Senior Trainer (FST), the highest chess trainer title.

At the "Full English Breakfast" website (thefeb.com, podcast #7 Part 1), Levon Aronian refers to Nadanian as his friend and second. Unable to accompany Aronian to the 2011 Wijk aan Zee tournament, they maintained daily contact online. During the entire month of February 2011, Nadanian, together with a team of five grandmasters—Wang Hao, Movsesian, Sargissian, Pashikian and Melkumyan—held training camp in Tsaghkadzor, helping Aronian to prepare for the Candidates Tournament of the World Chess Championship 2012 cycle. At the 2011 Crestbook KC-Conference Aronian noted: "Lots of players are involved in my team, but Ashot Nadanian is absolutely irreplaceable. Besides the work he does himself he manages the whole process, while also planning training sessions." During the Tata Steel Chess Tournament 2012 in Wijk aan Zee Aronian referred to Nadanian as his permanent assistant.

Nadanian once said in an interview that one of the joyful events of his life was the ending of the Turin Olympiad in 2006, when his student Sargissian became Olympic champion with the Armenian team and his other student Akobian won bronze with the U.S. team. At the next Olympiad in Dresden the story repeated itself: Sargissian won team gold medal and Akobian won team bronze.

== Personal life ==
=== Other chess activities and hobbies ===
Seven knights construction (2009)

Position: d8 white knight, c7 black knight, e7 black knight, b6 white knight, d6 black king, f6 white knight, c5 black knight, e5 black knight, d1 white king

Black has material advantage and turn to move, but must allow mate on the next move due to zugzwang.

One of Nadanian's hobbies along with reading, watching classical piano performances and writing aphorisms is chess composition. His first puzzle appeared in 1986 and since that time he has composed about fifty studies and puzzles, of which he considers only ten or twelve to be good. He is particularly attracted by the problems where, in a final position, White wins with a king and knights only. Whilst two knights cannot force checkmate against a lone king, they can do so in some exceptional cases when the defender has pawns or other pieces. This idea is most clearly embodied in the highly original Nadanian's problem with seven knights (see diagram). In December 2009, ChessBase published three of Nadanian's puzzles on "knights theme", calling him "a hippophile chess composer".

A chess book collector, Nadanian has a private library of more than a thousand volumes. He also plays correspondence chess.

=== Family ===
Nadanian lives in Yerevan. He married Evelina Zakharian since 1999, and they have a daughter Kiti (born 2004 in Moscow) and a son Vigen (born 2010 in Singapore). When asked in an interview whether being a father negatively affects his chess career, Nadanian replied, "I do not know, but even if that would be true, I'll never be sorry. Kiti and Vigen are more important to me than all my chess achievements put together."

=== Relationships ===
In the same interview Nadanian said that he has "perfect relations with virtually all Armenian top players", stressing that the closest are Levon Aronian, Gabriel Sargissian, Ara Minasian, Varuzhan Akobian and Andranik Matikozian. Nadanian also said that during the Linares Open of 1998 his friend Levon Aronian joked that Nadanian ate cat food. When in 2004 Nadanian named his daughter Kiti, Aronian replied, "See? I told you that it was 'Whiskas'!"

== Notable games ==
=== Nadanian vs. Sakaev, ICC 2001 ===
The game was played between Nadanian (White) and the former Russian champion, Konstantin Sakaev (Black) on the Internet Chess Club server in 2001. It was annotated by Tibor Karolyi in his Genius in the Background book (2009) and by Lubomir Kavalek in The Washington Post on 4 January 2010:

Nadanian vs. Konstantin Sakaev, 2001

Position: a8 black rook, b8 black knight, c8 black bishop, e8 black queen, f8 black rook, h8 black king, b7 black pawn, c7 black pawn, e7 black pawn, g7 black bishop, h7 black pawn, b6 black pawn, f5 black pawn, g5 white knight, c4 white bishop, d4 white pawn, e3 white bishop, a2 white pawn, b2 white pawn, f2 white pawn, g2 white pawn, h2 white pawn, a1 white rook, d1 white queen, e1 white king, h1 white rook

Position after 12...Qe8

Position: a8 black rook, b8 black knight, e8 black queen, f8 black king, b7 black pawn, c7 black pawn, e7 black pawn, f7 black rook, g7 black bishop, h7 white queen, b6 black pawn, e6 black bishop, h6 white bishop, f5 black pawn, d4 white pawn, a2 white pawn, b2 white pawn, f2 white pawn, g2 white pawn, h2 white pawn, a1 white rook, e1 white king, h1 white rook

Final position after 17.Bh6!

1. d4 Nf6 2. c4 g6 3. Nc3 d5 4. cxd5 Nxd5 5. Na4 The Nadanian Variation. White preventing c7–c5 and threatening 6.e4. 5... Bg7 6. e4 Nb6 7. Be3 0-0 8. Nf3 f5?! This weakens the kingside. 9. exf5 gxf5 10. Nxb6 axb6 11. Bc4+ Kh8? Yet another mistake; 11...e6 is correct. 12. Ng5! Opens the diagonal for the queen to reach the h-file. 12... Qe8 13. Bf7!! Kavalek writes, "A shocking deflection allowing the white queen to join the attack." 13... Rxf7 14. Qh5 Kg8 After 14...Bf6 15.Nxf7+ Kg7 16.Qh6+! Kxf7 17.Qh5+ Kf8 18.Bh6+ White wins. 15. Qxh7+ Kf8 16. Ne6+!! Karolyi writes, "This is a truly ferocious shot". 16... Bxe6 17. Bh6! Black has no defense against 18.Qh8 checkmate. 1–0

In 2012, the US National Master Frederick Rhine submitted this game to Chessgames.com and wrote: "A glorious combination! At the end, Black is up two pieces and has a boatload of pieces clustered around his king. White has only two pieces participating in the attack. However, Black's pieces are stepping on each other's toes and he is shockingly helpless against the back-rank mate 18.Qh8#, e.g. 17...Bxh6 (going three pieces up) 18.Qh8#. Note that Black would be winning if almost any of his kingside pieces was on a different square."

Karolyi proclaims, "A particularly striking example to showcase Ashot's brilliant attacking play."

=== Wu Shaobin vs. Nadanian, Singapore 2006 ===
The following game was played between the former member of China's Olympiad team GM Wu Shaobin (White) and Nadanian (Black) at Singapore 2006:

Wu Shaobin vs. Nadanian, 2006

Position: h1 white king, e1 white rook, b1 white queen, a1 white rook, h2 white pawn, e2 white bishop, a2 white pawn, h3 black bishop, g3 white pawn, g4 black knight, b4 white pawn, a4 black pawn, g5 white knight, d5 white pawn, f6 black rook, b6 black bishop, h7 black pawn, g7 black pawn, f7 black pawn, c7 black pawn, b7 black pawn, g8 black king, e8 black rook

Position after 27.Kh1

Position: e1 white rook, b1 white queen, a1 white rook, h2 black rook, e2 white bishop, a2 white pawn, g3 white pawn, e3 black bishop, f4 white king, b4 white pawn, a4 black pawn, h5 black pawn, g5 white knight, d5 white pawn, g7 black pawn, f7 black pawn, c7 black pawn, b7 black pawn, g8 black king, e8 black rook

Final position after 31... Be3+

1. d4 Nf6 2. c4 e5 3. dxe5 Ng4 4. Nf3 Bc5 5. e3 Nc6 6. Be2 Ncxe5 7. Nxe5 Nxe5 8. 0-0 0-0 9. b3 Re8 10. Bb2 a5 Well-known plan in this position, introduced by the IM Dolfi Drimer in 1968, with which Black develops the a8 rook along the sixth rank using the ...Ra8–a6–h6 manoeuvre. Nadanian calls the pawn advance a7–a5 "the soul of the Budapest Gambit". 11. Nc3 Ra6 12. Ne4 Ba7 13. Ng3 Qh4 14. Nf5 Qg5!? This was a new move. Before had been played 14...Qe4. 15. Nd4 Rg6 16. g3 d5?! 18...Qh6 was stronger. 17. cxd5? White should have played 17.Nb5! 17... Bh3! 18. Re1 Ng4 19. Nf3 Qxe3! Karolyi writes, "This shows Kasparov-like aggression and ingenuity." 20. Bd4 Qxf2+!! 21. Bxf2 Bxf2+ 22. Kh1 Bb6 23. Qb1? White should have defended with 23.Rf1! After 23...Ne3 24.Qd3 Bg2+ 25.Kg1 Bh3 White can either repeat moves with 26.Kh1, or try 26.Nd4. 23... Nf2+ 24. Kg1 Rf6! Black has time to increase the pressure. 25. b4! If 25.Qc2?, then 25...Ng4+ 26.Kh1 Bg2+! winning the queen. 25... a4! But not 25...Rxf3? 26.bxa5 26. Ng5 Ng4+! 27. Kh1 Bg2+!! "This is a marvellous move, and it must have been such a thrill to play it on the board." (Karolyi). 28. Kxg2 Rf2+ 29. Kh3 Rxh2+ 30. Kxg4 h5+ 31. Kf4 Be3+ 0–1

=== Others ===
- Viktor Bologan vs. Nadanian, Aeroflot Open (Moscow 2002), Sicilian Defense: Paulsen–Basman Defense (B40), 0–1
- Nadanian vs. Boris Grachev, European Individual Championships (Yerevan 2014), Sicilian Defense: Paulsen Variation (B46), 1–0
- Anton Korobov vs. Nadanian, 8th Asrian Memorial (Yerevan 2015), Bogo-Indian Defense, Grünfeld Variation (E11), 0–1

== Books ==
- Nadanian, Ashot (2013). Мои шахматы [My Chess] (in Russian). Дюаль. ISBN 978-99941-2-910-2.

== See also ==
- Grünfeld Defence, Nadanian Variation
