= Canadian chess periodicals =

Canadian chess periodicals encompasses the names, publication dates and history of the many chess magazines published in Canada.

== Chess Federation of Canada ==
Chess Canada formerly called, En Passant and CFC Bulletin was a hard copy bi-monthly chess journal published by the Chess Federation of Canada (CFC) from 1974 to 2008. The magazine's focus was on the Canadian chess scene, including but not limited to: tournaments, CFC members ELO's, articles and game analysis. The magazine was discontinued with CFC members now receiving a monthly email with the Canadian Chess News magazine in Portable Document Format (PDF) format. Members can either read the magazine on their computer monitor or print a hard copy version.

== List of Canadian chess periodicals ==
This list reflects the many periodicals that have appeared in the Canadian chess scene over the years:

- Alberta Chess Report (2006-2009)
- Apprenti sorcier (1991-1993)
- B.C. Chess (1969-1970)
- B.C. Chess Magazine later The Canadian Chess Magazine (1918-1919)
- B.C. Chess Reports later Counterplay (1981-1984)
- Bluenose Chess Bulletin (1968)
- British Columbia Chess Report (1976-1979)
- British Columbia Correspondence Chess Club Bulletin later several names (1956-1968)
- Bulletin de la Ligue d'Échecs de la Mauricie (1975-1980)
- Bulletin d'information, Ligue d'échecs de Montreal (1977-1983)
- Bulletin du Club, International Chess Club of Canada (1983)
- Cahier previously and later Chess Central Bugle (1976)
- Canadian Checkerist (1888 - ?)
- Canadian Chess Chat (1950-1992) originally Maritime Chess News (1947)
- Maritime Chess Chat (1947-1950)
- The Canadian Chess Magazine originally B.C. Chess Magazine (1991-1920)
- Canadian Chessner (1934-1937)
- Canadian Chess News (2009-2010)
- Canadian Chess Newsletter (2009)
- Canadian Chess Review (1991)
- Canadian Chess Scene (1972)
- CHECK! (1927-1968)
- Checkmate (1901-1904)
- Chess - Canadian Supplement (1937-1943)
- Chess Canada (1970-1975)
- Chess Canada Échecs (1973-2008)
- Chess Central Bugle (1974-1976)
- Chess Institute of Canada Newsletter (2006)
- The Chess Tablet (1957)
- Chess then and now (1999-2001)
- Cine Chess (1972)
- City Chess Club Newsletter (19??)
- Club talk (1993)
- Contented Knights (1949-1950)
- Échec+ (1984-) previously Le Petit Roque (1984)
- Échec au roi (1988-2009)
- Échecs Montréal (1976)
- Échecs premiere classe French edition of CHECK! (1975-1989)
- En Passant (1979)
- Exclam! (1988-1999)
- Governors' Letter (2010)
- Hébert Parle Échecs (1974-2009)
- The Kibitizer (1977-1978)
- Le Légéchecs (1979-1980)
- Manitoba Tournament Bulletin (1991)
- Matou previously Le Légéchecs (1980-1995)
- Metro Toronto Secondary School Chess Association Newsletter (1969-1974)
- Newsletter, Ontario Chess Association (1996)
- Northern, Chess Federation of Canada (1983-1994)
- Ontario Chess News (1981-1982)
- The Open File (1991)
- Le Petit Roque previously Québéchecs (1980-1984)
- Le Pion (1924-1926)
- Québéchecs later Le Petit Roque (1978-1980)
- Québéchecs (1973)
- Rank and File previously Chess Central Bugle (1977-1983)
- Chess Federation of Canada (1971-1973)
- Saskatchewan Chess (1962-1964)
- Scarboro Community of Toronto Chess News and Views (1999-2012)
- Scholar's Mate (1989-2009)
- Spéchecs: Bulletin du club Le Specialiste des échecs (1979-1982)
- The Things People Do (2005)
- Toronto Chess Club Journal (19??)
- Toronto Chess News (2012)

== See also ==
- Chess columns in newspapers
- Chess library
- List of chess periodicals
- List of chess books
