= List of chess periodicals =

Below is a list of chess periodicals. Publications are included only if they accept contributions from multiple authors and their content focuses primarily on some aspect of chess.

Name	Date	Frequency	Published	Subject	Website/Editor
50 Moves Magazine	2014–	Bimonthly	Australia	General	
64	1924–	Twice per month	Russia	General	
American Chess Bulletin	1904–1962	Monthly	United States	General	
American Chess Journal	1879–1881	seven issues	United States		
American Chess Magazine	1846–1847; 1897–1899; 2016–	Bimonthly	United States	General	Charles Henry Stanley
American Chess Quarterly	1961–65	Quarterly	United States	General	
Baltische Schachblaetter	1889–1893; 1898–1908				
Black & White	2004	4 times a year	India	General	
Brüderschaft; Deutsches Wochenschach	1885–1888; 1889–1925	Weekly	Germany	General	
British Chess Magazine	1881–	Monthly	England	General	
Chess Chow	1991–1994	??	United States	General	Joel Benjamin
Chess Express/Schach Express	1968–?	Twice per month	Switzerland	Current games	
Chess Horizons	1969–2016	4-12 times per year	USA, Massachusetts	General	
Chess Informant	1966–	4 times a year	Serbia	General	
Chess Life	1946–	Monthly	United States	General	
CHESS magazine	1935–	Monthly	England	General	
Chess Player's Chronicle	1841–56; 1859–75; 1877–1902	Monthly	England	General	-
Chess Review	1933–1969	Monthly	United States	General	-
Chess Today	2000–2020	Daily	Online/e-mail	General	
ChessBase News	2001–	Daily	Online	General	
ChessCafe.com	1996–	Weekly	Online	General	
Columbia Chess Chronicle	1887–91	??	United States	General	
Computerschach und Spiele	1983–2004	Bimonthly	Germany	Computer Chess	
Der Schachfreund	1898–1901	??	Germany	??	
Die Schwalbe	1924–	6 times per year	Germany	Chess problems	
Deutsche Schachzeitung	1846–1988	Monthly	Germany	General	-
EG	1965–	2 to 4 times per year	Netherlands	Endgame studies	
Europe Échecs	1959–	Monthly	France	General	
ICGA Journal	1977–	4 times per year	Netherlands	Computer chess	
International Chess Magazine	1885–1891	Monthly	United States	General	-
Jaque	1970–2013	Monthly	Spain	General	
Kingpin	1985–	3 times per year	England	General	
La Stratégie	1867–1940	Monthly	France	General	-
Le Courrier des Échecs	1947–	8 times per year	France	Correspondence chess	
Le Palamède	1836–1847	?	France	General	-
L'Italia Scacchistica	1911–	8 times per year	Italy	General	
Magyar Sakkélet	1951–1984; 1985–2003 (as Sakkélet)	12 times per year	Hungary	General	
Magyar Sakkvilág	1911–1950; 2003–	12 times per year	Hungary	General	
Messaggero Scacchi	2000–	Weekly	Online	General	
New In Chess	1984–	8 times per year	Netherlands	General	
Norsk sjakkblad	1906–1909; 1919–1929; 1932–1939; 1950–	4 times per year	Norway	General	
Northwest Chess	1947–	12 times per year	USA Washington Oregon Idaho	General	
Panorama Szachowa	1993–	12 times per year	Poland	General	
Peón de rey	2001–	12 times per year	Spain	General	
Probleemblad	1943–	6 times per year	Netherlands	Chess problems	
Rochade Europa	1972–	12 times per year	Germany	General	
Sadakalo 64	2013–	Monthly	Bangladesh	General	
Scacco!	1970–1999	Monthly	Italy	General	
Schaak Magazine	1893–	Monthly	Netherlands	General	-
Schach	1947–	Monthly	Germany	General	
Schach-Magazin 64	1979–	Monthly	Germany	General	
Shakhmatny Bulletin	1955–1990	Monthly	Soviet Union	Current games	-
Shakhmaty v SSSR	1921–1991	Monthly	Soviet Union	General	-
StrateGems	1998–2022	4 times per year	United States	Chess problems	
Schweizerische Schachzeitung	1900–	Monthly	Switzerland	General	
Tidsskrift för Schack	1895–	Monthly	Sweden	General	
The Chess Monthly	1857–1861	Monthly	United States	General	-
The Chess Correspondent	1930–		United States	Correspondence chess	-
The London Chess Fortnightly	1892–1893	Bimonthly	England	General	-
The Philidorian	1837–1838	Six issues	England	General	-
The Problemist	1926–	6 times per year	England	Chess problems	
The Week in Chess	1994–	Weekly	Online	Chess news	
Torre & Cavallo Scacco!	1987–	Bimonthly	Italy	General	

== See also ==
- Canadian chess periodicals
- Chess library
- Chess columns in newspapers
- List of chess books
