= Summer Dylan Quercia =

American chess player (born 1985)

- Born: 1985 (age 40–41)
- Education: University of Illinois Chicago (BS)
- Occupations: chess player, chess coach, journalist, filmmaker
- Chess career
- Country: United States
- Peak rating: 1972 (September 2011)
- Website: coachqchess.com

Summer Dylan Quercia (born 1985) is an American chess player, chess coach, journalist, and filmmaker. She won the U2100 section at the 2016 U.S. Open Chess Championship. She reported on chess for American Chess Magazine, Chess Life, and SportsCenter.

== Early life and education ==
Quercia was born in 1985. She placed first in checkers and second in foosball at the Arizona Boys & Girls State Games when she was ten years old. She was the vice president of her high school's drama club.

She earned a bachelor of science degree in biological sciences from the University of Illinois Chicago. While an undergraduate student, she taught chess to students in the Chicago area.

== Career ==
Quercia is ranked in the top 2 percent of American chess players. She won the U2100 section at the 2016 U.S. Open Chess Championship and scored in the top 25 at the 2015 Open. In 2023, her FIDE rating was 1784.

Quercia worked as an editor at Southern California Chess Federation's magazine Rank & File, and was a contributor to American Chess Magazine and the United States Chess Federation magazine Chess Life. She was also featured on ESPN's SportsCenter.

She created the 2024 documentary film King Chess! about the 2018 Candidates Tournament.

She also runs a chess coaching business.

== Personal life ==
Quercia and her wife live in Los Angeles. She is a transgender woman and identifies as bisexual and queer.
