= 64 Magazine =

64 Magazine may refer to:

- 64 Magazine, a British magazine covering the Nintendo 64 console published by Paragon Publishing
- 64 (magazine), a Russian magazine covering chess and draughts
