= Alexander Shakarov =

Soviet chess player (born 1948)

Personal information
- Native name: Александр Иванович Шакаров
- Born: Alexander Ivanovich Shakarov; March 8, 1948 (age 78) Baku, Azerbaijan SSR, Soviet Union

Chess career
- Country: Soviet Union; Russia
- Title: National Master

Alexander Ivanovich Shakarov (Russian: Александр Иванович Шакаров; born 8 March 1948) is a Soviet chess player, coach and author. He is known for being the coach of Garry Kasparov, chess grandmaster, who was the World Chess Champion from 1985 to 2000, and Ashot Nadanian, chess theoretician and chess coach.

== Biography ==
Alexander Ivanovich Shakarov was born on 8 March 1948, in Baku, Azerbaijan SSR, Soviet Union in an Armenian family. He became interested chess at a young age and know how to play chess at the age of 14. He analyzed his chess games through the Soviet chess school system, representing Azerbaijan SSR in competitions. In 1966, at age 18, he competed in the USSR Junior Chess Championship in Baku and had one of his game draw with Anatoly Karpov. He then later got the title of Candidate Master.

In 1976, Shakarov began coaching Ashot Nadanian and Garry Kasparov for more than thirty years until Kasparov's retirement from chess in 2005. After retirement, Shakarov lives in Podolsk till today. While coaching, him and Kasparov played for the Spartak club. In 1975, at the USSR Central Asian Quarterfinals in Baku, Shakarov achieved the USSR Master of Sports standard. His match against his student Garry at the Khalilbeyli Memorial in ended in a draw and later reached the finals of Spartak Society championships and played for the Azerbaijani team in national team tournaments.

In 1990, during the conflict of the anti-Armenian violence during the Baku pogrom, Shakarov, along with Garry Kasparov and his family, was forced to evacuate Baku on a chartered flight to Moscow, leaving behind his home in Azerbaijan.

== Personal life ==
In 1984, both Shakarov and Garry Kasparov wrote Caro-Kann: Classical 4…Bf5 book. Kasparov said, The name of Alexander Shakarov might not be world-famous, but hardly anyone has lived a life more dedicated to chess. He is one of the most dedicated workers I've ever met.

== Legacy ==
The fourth chapter of Tibor Károlyi's 2009 book Genius in the Background is devoted to him.

== Books ==
- Kasparov, Garry; Shakarov, Aleksander (1984). Caro-Kann: Classical 4.Bf5. Batsford. ISBN 0-7134-4237-9.
- Shakarov, Aleksander; Belov, Igor; Tsaturian, Valeri; Vilensky, L. (1996). Anthology of Chess Beauty. Saturn-S. ISBN 5-8468-0045-9.
