= Chess libraries =

Library with collection related to chess

Chess libraries are library collections of books and periodicals on the game of chess. In 1913, preeminent chess historian H. J. R. Murray estimated the total number of books, magazines, and newspaper columns pertaining to chess to be about 5,000 at that time. B. H. Wood estimated that number, as of 1949, to be about 20,000. David Hooper and Kenneth Whyld write that, "Since then there has been a steady increase year by year of the number of new chess publications. No one knows how many have been printed..."

== Libraries ==
=== Public ===
Significant public chess libraries include:

The John G. White Chess and Checkers Collection at Cleveland Public Library has the largest chess and draughts library in the world, with over 32,000 chess books and over 6,000 bound volumes of chess periodicals." It was started with the donation of a quarter of a million dollars and 11,000 books from John G. White's private library upon his death.

The Chess & Draughts collection at the Bibliotheca Van der Linde-Niemeijeriana (part of the Koninklijke Bibliotheek, the National Library of the Netherlands). The second largest public chess collection in the world is built on the donations of the private chess libraries of Antonius van der Linde, Meindert Niemeijer and G.L. Gortmans. It contains about 30,000 books.

The M.V. Anderson Chess Collection held at State Library Victoria (Melbourne, Australia) is the largest public chess collection in the Southern hemisphere. This contains in excess of 12,000 books and many journal and newsletter titles. Additional titles are added each year. It is based around M.V. Anderson's personal collection of 6700 volumes donated between 1959 and 1966.

The English National Chess Library held at De Montfort University in Leicester holds around 7,000 books building on that of chess writer Harry Golombek.

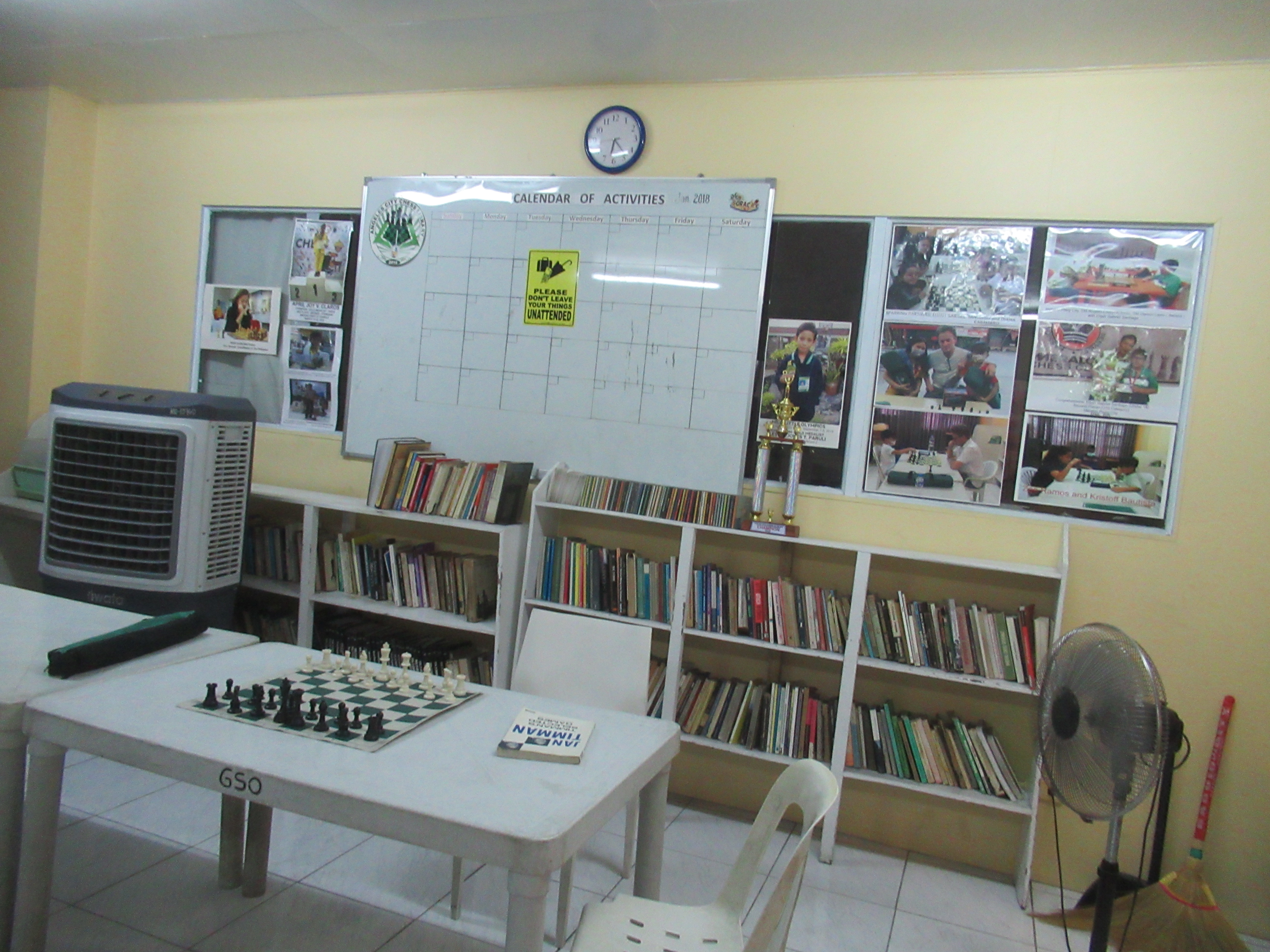
Chess library (Angeles City Library and Information Center)

=== Private ===
Grandmaster Lothar Schmid of Bamberg, Germany reportedly owned the world's largest private collection of chess books and memorabilia. In 1992, Hooper and Whyld stated that Schmid's chess library "is the largest and finest in private hands, with more than 15,000 items". In 2008, Susan Polgar stated that Schmid "has over 20,000 chess books". Dirk Jan ten Geuzendam states that Schmid "boasts to have amassed 50,000 chess books".

David DeLucia's chess library contains 7,000 to 8,000 chess books, a similar number of autographs (letters, score sheets, manuscripts), and about 1,000 items of "ephemera". DeLucia's library contains such items as "a 15th-century Lucena manuscript, score-sheets ranging from Fischer's Game of the Century against Donald Byrne to all the games of the 1927 New York tournament, eight letters by Morphy, over a hundred Lasker manuscripts, Capablanca's gold pocket watch, [and] the contract of the 1886 Steinitz-Zukertort world championship match". Ten Geutzendam opines that DeLucia's collection "is arguably the finest chess collection in the world".

Former World Champion Anatoly Karpov has a large chess library, as well as a stamp collection.

The Musée Suisse du Jeu in Switzerland has a room devoted to chess, according to number 152 of EG, which reports their purchase of Ken Whyld's library in 2004. As of January 2010, the British Chess Variants Society was planning to transfer five boxes of archival material related to David Pritchard's research for the Encyclopedia of Chess Variants to that collection.

== See also ==
- List of chess books
- List of chess periodicals
