= International Chess Magazine =

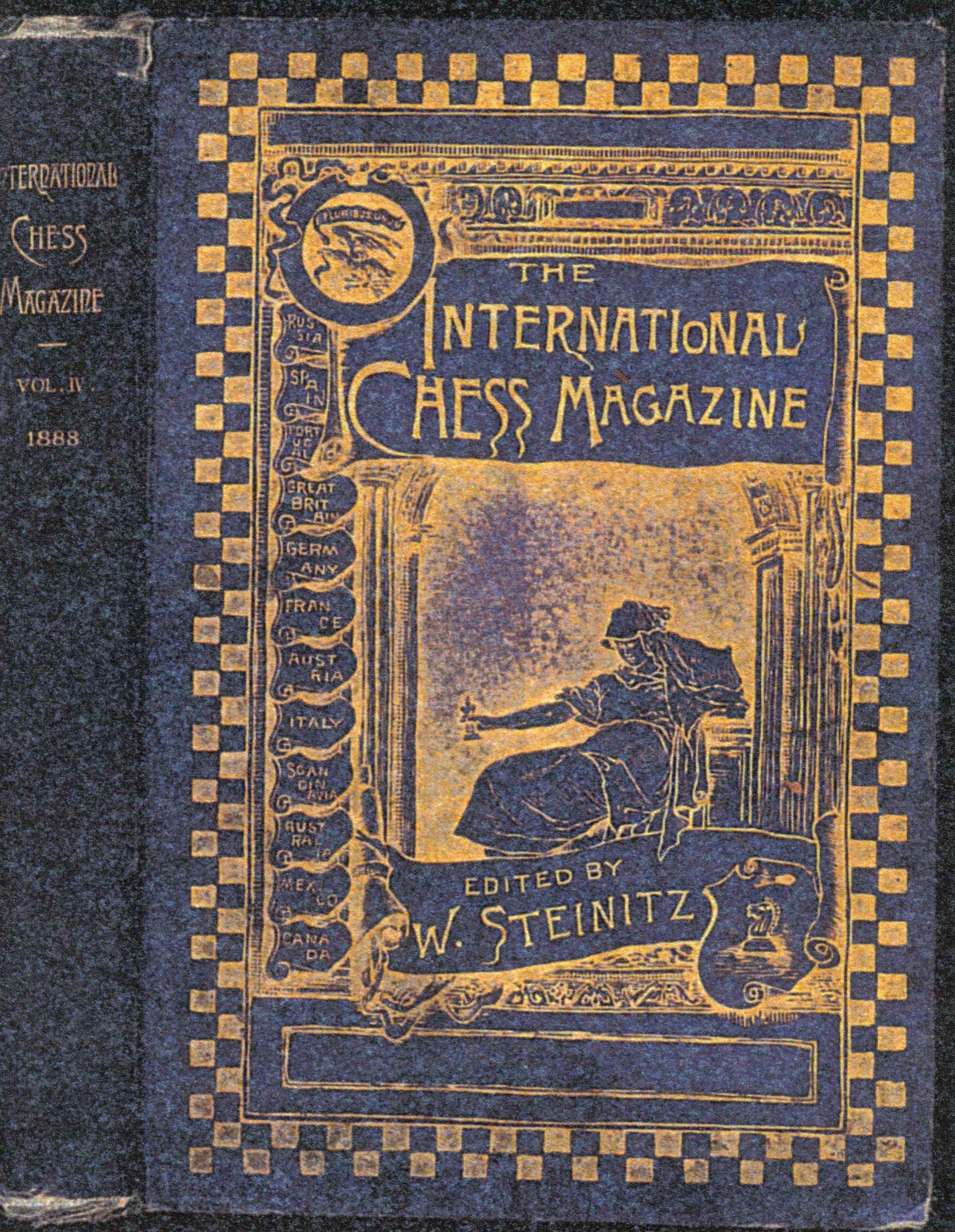
- Volume IV, 1888
- Editor: Wilhelm Steinitz
- Categories: Chess
- Frequency: Monthly
- Founder: Wilhelm Steinitz
- Founded: 1885
- First issue: January 1885; 141 years ago
- Final issue: December 1891
- Country: United States
- Based in: New York City
- Language: English

The International Chess Magazine (ICM), founded by World Chess Champion Wilhelm Steinitz, was a monthly chess periodical published from January 1885 until December 1891, producing a total of seven volumes.

== Bibliography ==
- Di Felice, Gino (2010). Chess Periodicals: An Annotated International Bibliography, 1836–2008. McFarland & Company. ISBN 978-0-7864-4643-8 – via archive.org.
