= Hartwig Cassel =

Chess journalist

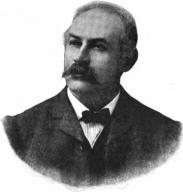
Hartwig Cassel

Hartwig Cassel (November 2, 1850 in Konitz, West Prussia (now Chojnice, Poland) – 1929) was a chess journalist, editor and promoter in Great Britain and the United States of America.

Cassel was born at Konitz, where his father, Dr. Aaron Cassel, was rabbi, and was educated at the Real-Gymnasium in Landsberg an der Warthe (now Gorzów Wielkopolski, Poland). In 1879 he went to Britain. He lived in Scotland, where he was a member of the Glasgow Chess Club, and later moved to Bradford, Yorkshire, where he began his journalistic career as the chess editor of the Observer-Budget. He wrote chess articles for the metropolitan and provincial English papers, organized the Yorkshire County Chess Club, arranged the Joseph Henry Blackburne-Isidor Gunsberg match at Bradford (1887) and the International Chess Masters' Tournament in 1888 at the same city.

Cassel left England in 1889 and went to Havana for an English and New York newspaper syndicate to report the Mikhail Tchigorin-Gunsberg match. In 1890 he went to the United States and was offered a job at the New Yorker Staatszeitung. He wrote about chess not only in that paper, but also in the New York Tribune and wrote a special chess column nearly every Sunday for The New York Sun. He was instrumental in establishing the Staats-Zeitung and Rice trophies, and arranged, among other important contests, the first cable match between the Manhattan Chess Club and the British Chess Club in 1895, the forerunner of the Anglo-American series. He was the inventor of a chess cable code.

In 1904 he and Hermann Helms published the first issue of the American Chess Bulletin. That issue included all 120 games from the 1904 Cambridge Springs tournament.
