= Norsk Sjakkblad =

Magazine

Norsk Sjakkblad (The Norwegian Chess Magazine) is a Norwegian chess periodical published by the Norwegian Chess Federation. It serves as a member's magazine for the federation, but is available to subscribers as well. Common topics include tournament news, results, national rating lists and annotated games.

The periodical has been published since 1906, although not continuously. Since 1975 it has been published regularly, currently at the pace of four issues each year. The magazine is based in Oslo.

GM Leif Erlend Johannessen is the present editor of Norsk Sjakkblad.
