= Leif Erlend Johannessen =

Norwegian chess grandmaster (born 1980)

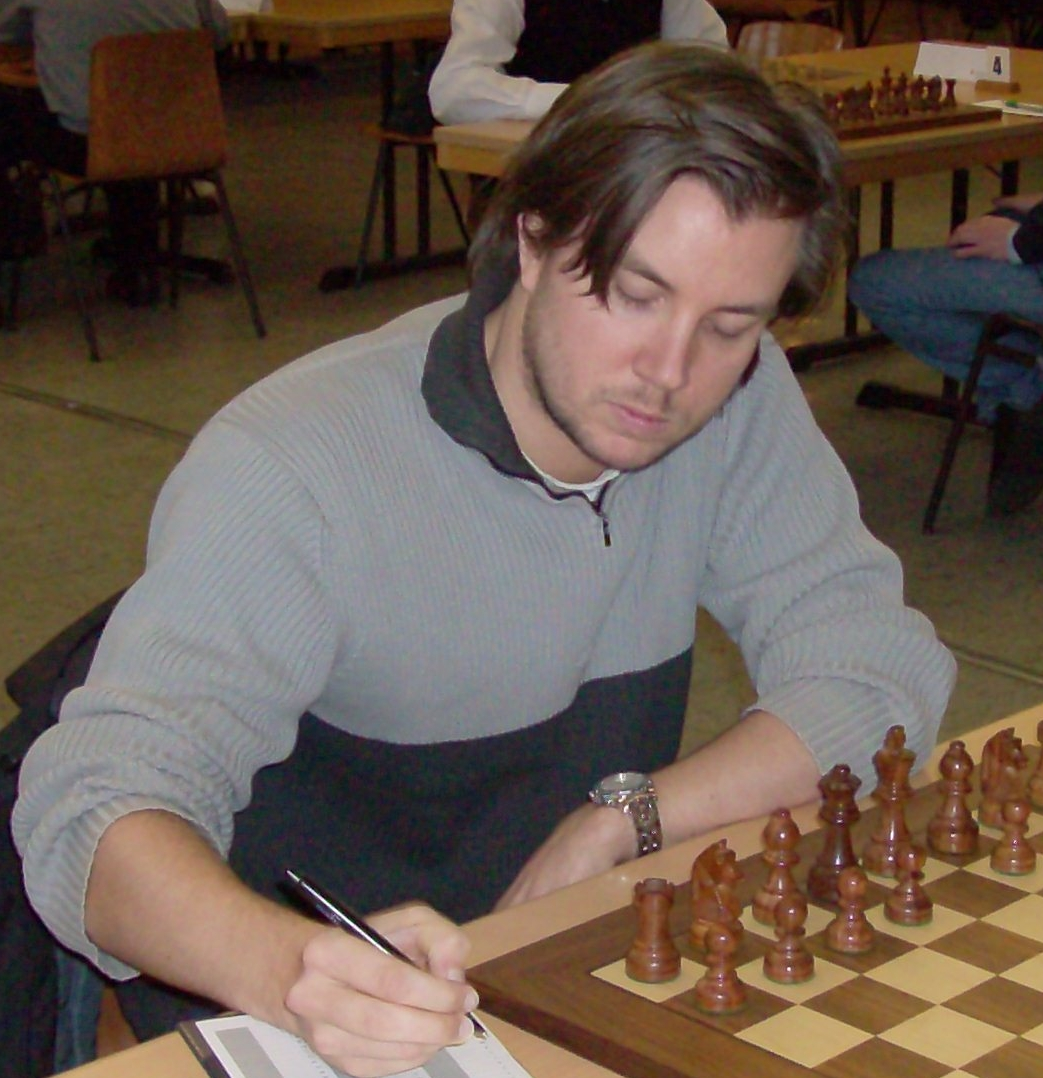
- Johannessen in 2008

Personal information
- Born: 14 May 1980 (age 46) Oslo, Norway

Chess career
- Country: Norway
- Title: Grandmaster (2002)
- FIDE rating: 2410 (July 2026)
- Peak rating: 2564 (October 2005)

Leif Erlend Johannessen (born 14 May 1980) is a Norwegian chess player, and Norway's fifth grandmaster. He received his title in 2002, and was at the time Norway's second youngest grandmaster of all times. He picked up his first norm in Oslo, the second at Bermuda and finally the third in the Sigeman tournament in Malmö. Johannessen has yet to win the Norwegian championship, the closest he has come is second place in 1999 after losing the play-off 0-2 to Berge Østenstad. Johannessen has won the Norwegian blitz and rapid championship several times though.

Johannessen usually plays 1.d4 when he is White. With Black, Johannessen employs a variety of defenses including the Sicilian Defence and Caro–Kann Defence against 1.e4 and the Queen's Gambit Declined, Slav Defense, or Semi-Slav Defense against 1.d4.

Johannessen works as attorney. He is also the editor-in-chief of the official Norwegian Chess Magazine.

Johannessen is an honorary member of the Portuguese amateur team Mata de Benfica and played in the Portuguese First League Team Championship in the season 2006/2007 and 2008/2009 for this team.

== Sample game ==
- White: Leif Erlend Johannessen
- Black: Hikaru Nakamura
- Opening: Grünfeld Defence, Exchange Variation
- Played at Bermuda 28 January 2002, round 7

1.d4 Nf6 2.c4 g6 3.Nc3 d5 4.cxd5 Nxd5 5.e4 Nxc3 6.bxc3 Bg7 7.Nf3 c5 8.Rb1 0–0 9.Be2 cxd4 10.cxd4 Qa5+ 11.Bd2 Qxa2 12.0–0 Bg4 13.Bg5 Qe6 14.h3 Bxf3 15.Bxf3 Qd7 16.d5 Na6 17.Qe2 Nc5 18.e5 Rae8 19.Rfd1 f6 20.Be3 Rc8 21.d6 b6 22.Bxc5 Rxc5 23.e6 Qc8 24.dxe7 Re8 25.Rd8 Rxd8 26.exd8=Q+ Qxd8 27.e7 Qe8 28.Qe6+ Kh8 29.Rd1 Rc8 30.Qxc8 Qxc8 31.Rd8+, Black resigns
