= American Chess Magazine =

American magazine

- Frequency: Bi-monthly
- Founded: 2016
- Country: United States
- Based in: Austin, Texas
- Language: English
- Website: acmchess.com

American Chess Magazine is a bi-monthly periodical founded in 2016 and named after an earlier publication originally established in 1897. The editor-in-chief and CEO is Josip Asik and the managing editor is Dusan Krunic. The magazine is in print only, with no digital version, and is 98 pages long and square bound.

American Chess Magazine is staffed by an international team of contributing editors and writers, but consistent with the title, its main focus is on American players and events. In addition to news and interviews, the magazine has the following regular features and columns, as of December, 2023: Chess Training, The Magnificent Three, Chess and Finance, Small Chess Lectures, All Things Chess, Unknown American Games, Chess Psychology, Book Reviews, Chess Tech, and Endings.

== Awards ==
American Chess Magazine was awarded Best Overall Magazine by Chess Journalists of America in 2023.

== See also ==
- American Chess Bulletin
- List of chess periodicals
