= Chess Oscar =

World's best player award (1967–88; 1995–2014)

Chess Oscar was an international award given annually to the best chess player. The winner was selected by votes that were cast by chess journalists from across the world. The traditional voting procedure was to request hundreds of chess journalists from many countries to submit a list of the ten best players of the year. The voters were journalists who knew the game and followed it closely, and so the honor was highly prized. The award itself took the form of a bronze statuette representing a man in a boat. The prize was created and awarded in 1967 by Spanish journalist Jorge Puig, and the International Association of Chess Press (AIPE). The awards were given from 1967 until 1988. Then, after a pause, they resumed in 1995, and were then organized by the Russian chess magazine 64 until 2014.

The Oscar for the best woman chess player of the year was established in 1982. (Note: This award is not related to the more recent FIDE Caissa Award, established in 2009, occasionally referenced also as a Women Chess Oscar.)

== Statuette ==
The statuette's final form, a man in a boat, was carved by the sculptor Alexander Smirnov. It represented a figure known as "The Fascinated Wanderer", which refers to a short story written in 1873 by 19th-century Russian author Nikolai Leskov. In this story, the title character, Ivan Flyagin, is a horse trainer and a brute of a man. From his birth his mother has promised that Ivan's life would be devoted to the church. Ivan spends many years avoiding this fate, but eventually gives in and becomes a monk, not for spiritual reasons, but due to a poverty of opportunity.

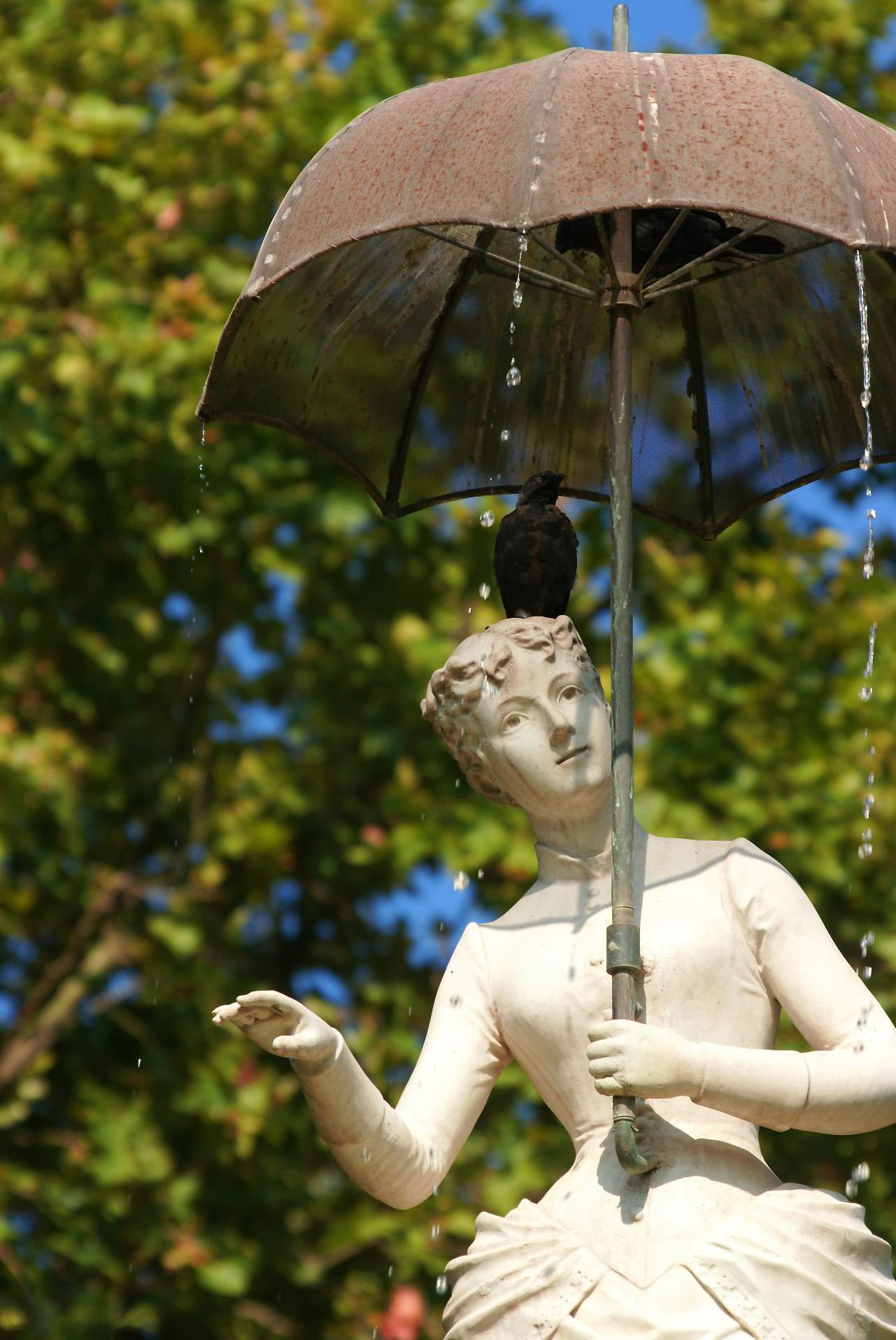
"The Lady of the Umbrella"

The Chess Oscar statuette originally took the form of "The Lady of the Umbrella", a figure based on a statue in Parc de la Ciutadella in Barcelona, Spain.

== Winners ==
Year	Player	Country
1967	Bent Larsen	Denmark
1968	Boris Spassky	Soviet Union
1969	Boris Spassky	Soviet Union
1970	Bobby Fischer	United States
1971	Bobby Fischer	United States
1972	Bobby Fischer	United States
1973	Anatoly Karpov	Soviet Union
1974	Anatoly Karpov	Soviet Union
1975	Anatoly Karpov	Soviet Union
1976	Anatoly Karpov	Soviet Union
1977	Anatoly Karpov	Soviet Union
1978	Viktor Korchnoi	Switzerland
1979	Anatoly Karpov	Soviet Union
1980	Anatoly Karpov	Soviet Union
1981	Anatoly Karpov	Soviet Union
1982	Garry Kasparov	Soviet Union
1983	Garry Kasparov	Soviet Union
1984	Anatoly Karpov	Soviet Union
1985	Garry Kasparov	Soviet Union
1986	Garry Kasparov	Soviet Union
1987	Garry Kasparov	Soviet Union
1988	Garry Kasparov	Soviet Union
1989–94	no awards	
1995	Garry Kasparov	Russia
1996	Garry Kasparov	Russia
1997	Viswanathan Anand	India
1998	Viswanathan Anand	India
1999	Garry Kasparov	Russia
2000	Vladimir Kramnik	Russia
2001	Garry Kasparov	Russia
2002	Garry Kasparov	Russia
2003	Viswanathan Anand	India
2004	Viswanathan Anand	India
2005	Veselin Topalov	Bulgaria
2006	Vladimir Kramnik	Russia
2007	Viswanathan Anand	India
2008	Viswanathan Anand	India
2009	Magnus Carlsen	Norway
2010	Magnus Carlsen	Norway
2011	Magnus Carlsen	Norway
2012	Magnus Carlsen	Norway
2013	Magnus Carlsen	Norway

=== Women ===
Year	Player	Country
1982	Nona Gaprindashvili	Soviet Union
1983	Pia Cramling	Sweden
1984	Maya Chiburdanidze	Soviet Union
1985	Maya Chiburdanidze	Soviet Union
1986	Maya Chiburdanidze	Soviet Union
1987	Maya Chiburdanidze	Soviet Union
1988	Judit Polgár	Hungary
1995	Judit Polgár	Hungary
1996	Judit Polgár	Hungary
2000	Judit Polgár	Hungary
2001	Judit Polgár	Hungary
2002	Judit Polgár	Hungary

== By person ==
Player	Country	Wins
Garry Kasparov	Soviet Union, later Russia	11
Anatoly Karpov	Soviet Union	9
Viswanathan Anand	India	6
Magnus Carlsen	Norway	5
Bobby Fischer	United States	3
Boris Spassky	Soviet Union	2
Vladimir Kramnik	Russia	2
Bent Larsen	Denmark	1
Viktor Korchnoi	Switzerland	1
Veselin Topalov	Bulgaria	1

== By nation ==
Country	Wins
Soviet Union	17
Russia	7
India	6
Norway	5
United States	3
Bulgaria	1
Denmark	1
Switzerland	1
