= Brüderschaft =

Brotherhood drinking ritual

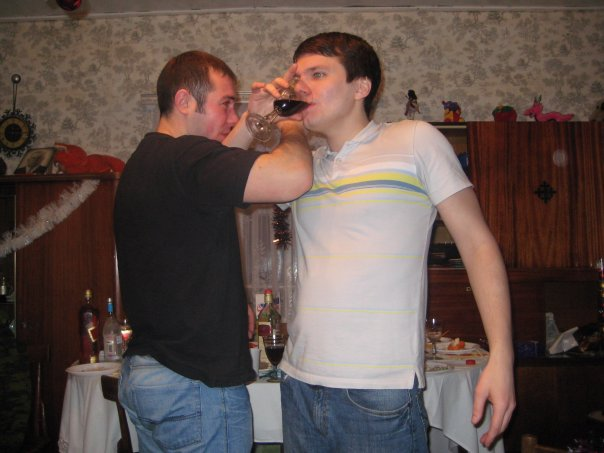
Drinking at a brüderschaft

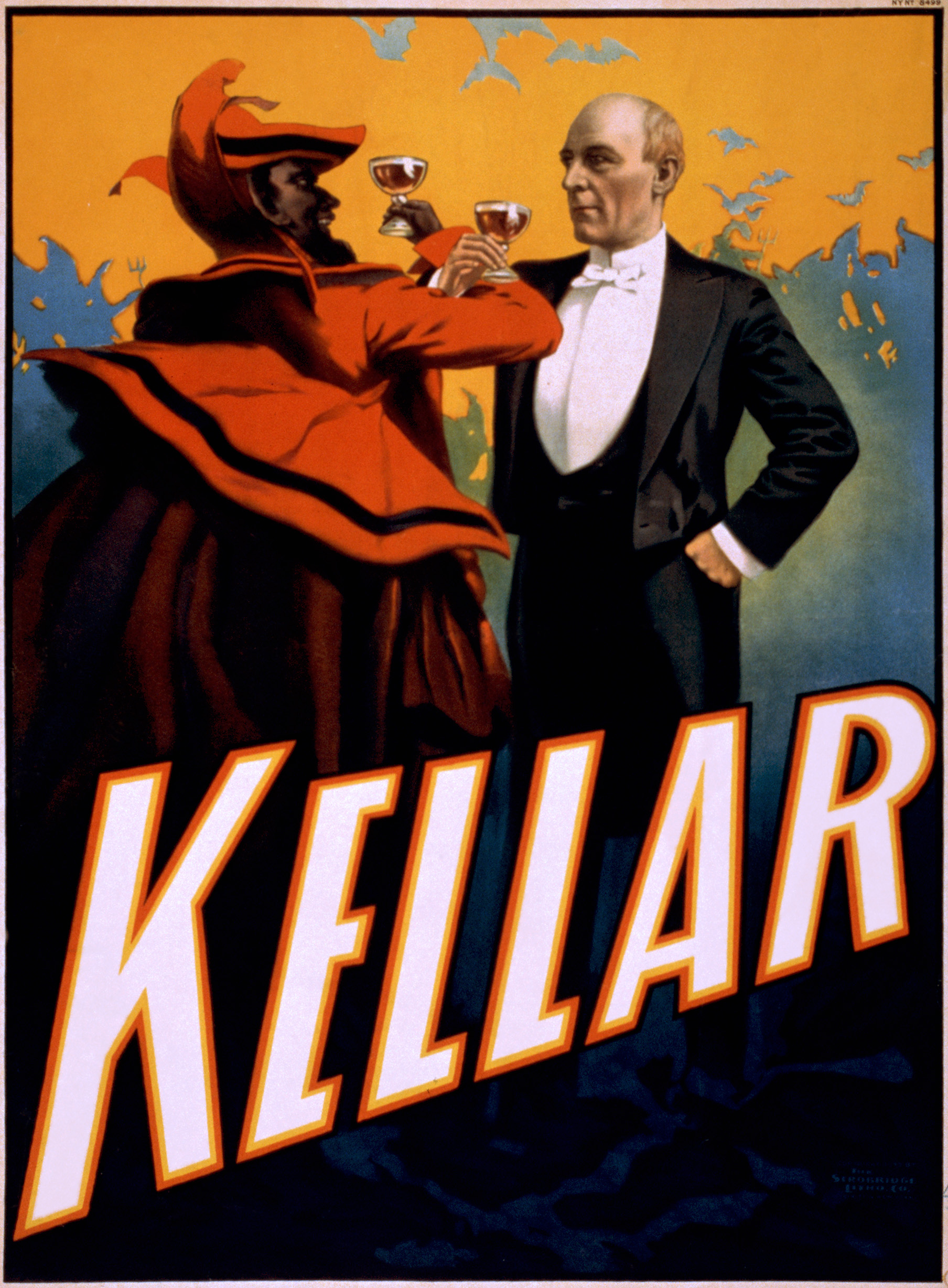
Advertising poster, c. 1899; American magician Harry Kellar making a brüderschaft with the devil

The brüderschaft (lit. 'brotherhood' in German) or brüderschafttrinken (lit. 'brotherhood-drinking') (Note: In Austrian German, bruderschaft and bruderschafttrinken respectively.) is a drinking ritual, or a rite of passage, to consolidate friendship. Two people simultaneously drink a glass of the same alcoholic beverage each, with their arms intertwined at the elbows. A "brotherly kiss" is customary after emptying the glasses, which then seals the ritual. Thence they are considered good friends and address each other informally.

A symbolic act that establishes a closer bond between two—usually male—individuals, it has been associated with an end of formality between them and addressing each other du (the informal you in German) at least since Jus Potandi oder ZechRecht, a legal-parodic text published in 1616. In the 17th and 18th centuries, the expression auf den Dutz trinken (Note: It means the same as auf das Duzen trinken (lit. 'drink to the Duzen'). Duzen (pronounced [ˈduːtsn̩]) is a verb that signifies using du—the informal you in German—to address.) was also common, allegedly based on the assumption that "drinking together would bind and oblige".
