= Georg Mohr (chess player) =

Slovenian chess grandmaster (born 1965)

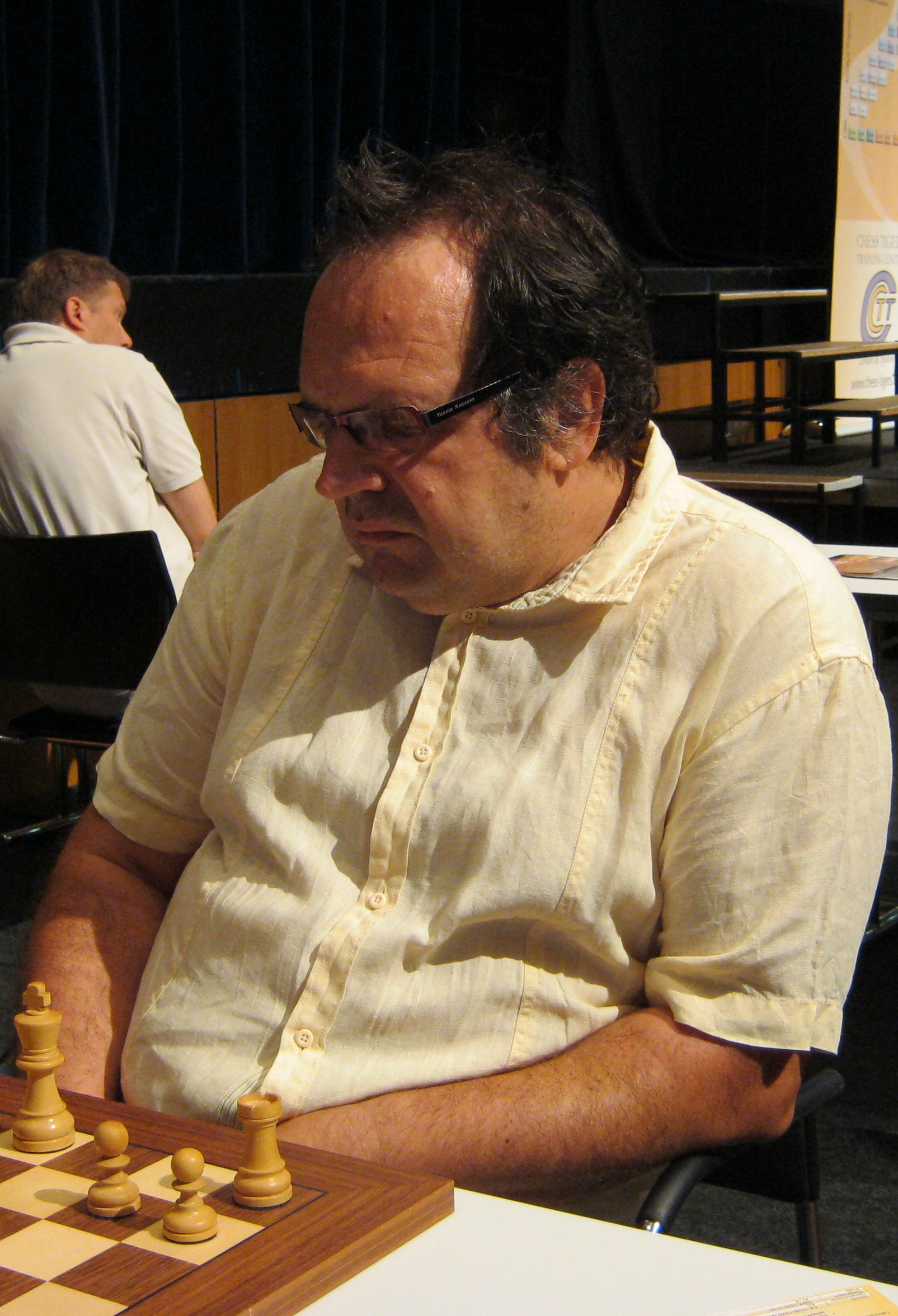

Personal information
- Born: February 2, 1965 (age 61) Maribor, Slovenia

Chess career
- Country: Slovenia
- Title: Grandmaster (1997)
- Peak rating: 2523 (July 2002)

Georg Mohr (born 2 February 1965) is a Slovenian chess player and chess journalist. In 1992, 1994, 1996, 1998, 2000 and 2002, Mohr played for the Slovenian Olympic team. For the next three Chess Olympiads, he was the selector of Slovenian Olympic men's team. In 2004 he was awarded the title of FIDE Senior Trainer.
