= Daniel Fernandez (English chess player) =

English chess grandmaster (born 1995)

Personal information
- Born: Daniel Howard Fernandez; 5 March 1995 (age 31) Stockport, England

Chess career
- Country: England; Singapore (2004–2015)
- Title: Grandmaster (2017)
- FIDE rating: 2526 (November 2026)
- Peak rating: 2542 (September 2026)

Daniel Howard Fernandez (born 5 March 1995) is an English and Singaporean chess grandmaster and author.

== Career ==
Born in Stockport, England, Fernandez was the joint under-9 British champion in 2004. Shortly afterwards, his family relocated to Singapore, where he was a member of that country's National Junior Squad. While living there, he attained the title of International Master in 2010. In team competitions, Fernandez represented Singapore in the Chess Olympiad in 2010 and 2012, and in the Under-16 Chess Olympiad in 2007.

Between 2011 and 2018, Fernandez lived in the United Kingdom, where he attended the Manchester Grammar School and Queens' College, Cambridge. He was the British under-18 champion in 2013 and the British under-21 champion in 2014. Fernandez was awarded the title of Grandmaster in October 2017, at the 88th FIDE Congress held in Goynuk, Antalya, Turkey.

Fernandez writes periodically on the specialist news site ChessBase.

== Personal life ==
Fernandez was born in England to a Singaporean father of Indian descent and an English mother. He moved to Singapore in 2004 with his parents, before returning to England to study.

== Publications ==
- Fernandez, Daniel (2018). The Modernized Caro-Kann: A Complete Repertoire against 1.e4. Thinkers Publishing. ISBN 978-9492510259
- Daniel Fernandez (2018). The Reliable Petroff - An Evergreen Elite Choice. Fritztrainer opening DVD, ChessBase.
- Fernandez, Daniel (2020). The Modernized Modern Defense. Thinkers Publishing. ISBN 978-9492510884
