= List of chess books =

This is a list of chess books that are used as references in articles related to chess. The list is organized by alphabetical order of the author's surname, then the author's first name, then the year of publication, then the alphabetical order of title.

As a general rule, only the original edition should be listed except when different editions bring additional encyclopedic value. Examples of exceptions include:

- When various editions are different enough to be considered as nearly a different book, for example for opening encyclopedias when each edition is completely revised and has even different authors (example: Modern Chess Openings).
- When the book is too old to have an ID (ISBN, OCLC number, ...) that makes it easy for the reader to find it. In that case, both the first and the last edition can be indicated.

Authors with five books or more have a sub-section title on their own, to increase the usability of the table of contents. When a book was written by several authors, it is listed once under the name of each author.

See:

- List of chess books (A–F)
- List of chess books (G–L)
- List of chess books (M–S)
- List of chess books (T–Z)

== See also ==
- Chess endgame literature
- Chess in early literature
- Chess opening book
- Chess publications
- List of chess periodicals
- List of books and documentaries by or about Bobby Fischer
- Novels about chess
