= 64 (magazine) =

Russian chess and draughts periodical

64 – Shakhmatnoye Obozreniye
- Native name: 64 – Шахматное обозрение
- Editor: Maxim Notkin
- Categories: Chess
- Frequency: Monthly
- Publisher: Igor Burshtein
- Founded: 1924
- Country: Russia
- Based in: Moscow
- Language: Russian
- Website: 64.ru
- ISSN: 0321-5466

64 – Shakhmatnoye Obozreniye (64 – Шахматное обозрение, lit. '64 – Chess Review') is a Russian-language monthly chess and draughts magazine published in Moscow, Russia. Its name refers to the 64 squares on a standard chessboard. Founded in 1924, it is one of the longest-running chess periodicals in the world and the premier chess publication in Russia. The magazine remains active as of 2026, publishing 12 issues per year in both print and digital (PDF) formats.

From 1995 to 2013, 64 organised and awarded the Chess Oscar, an annual international prize voted on by chess journalists worldwide to honour the best chess player of the year.

== History ==
=== Origins and Soviet era (1924–1941) ===
The publication first appeared in 1924 as a magazine under the editorship of Nikolai Krylenko, a senior Soviet official and prominent chess patron. In 1935 it changed format to a weekly newspaper. Krylenko remained editor until his arrest and execution during the Great Purge in 1938. Publication was interrupted in 1941 following the German invasion of the Soviet Union and did not resume until after World War II.

=== Revival and the Soviet golden era (1968–1991) ===
In 1968, the publication was substantially revamped as a weekly magazine at the initiative of reigning World Chess Champion Tigran Petrosian. Alexander Roshal (1936–2007), a Soviet chess trainer and journalist, joined as acting secretary and became the central figure in the magazine's identity for the following four decades. Former World Champion Vasily Smyslov served as an assistant editor. Petrosian served as editor-in-chief until 1977, when he was dismissed following his loss to Viktor Korchnoi in a quarter-final Candidates match.

During the 1980s, Anatoly Karpov served as editor-in-chief (1980–1991). In 1986, the magazine made cultural history by publishing excerpts from Other Shores (Drugie Berega), the Russian-language autobiography of Vladimir Nabokov — the first work by Nabokov ever openly published in the USSR. Roshal was severely sanctioned for the decision despite Karpov nominally holding the editor-in-chief position at the time.

The publication became a full monthly magazine in 1980. At its peak during the Soviet era, 64 was one of the most widely read chess periodicals in the world.

=== Post-Soviet privatisation and revival (1992–2007) ===
The collapse of the Soviet Union brought severe financial difficulties. In 1992, the magazine ceased publication. Roshal privatised the title and, with co-investors, resurrected it later that year. Roshal served as editor-in-chief from 1992 until his death on 21 May 2007 in Moscow, following a prolonged struggle with pancreatic cancer. He was 71 years old. He is buried at Vostryakovo Cemetery, Moscow.

Under Roshal's stewardship the magazine shifted from twice-monthly to monthly publication, settling on 12 issues per year from 2000 onward. Roshal was also instrumental in reviving the Chess Oscar in 1995, which 64 administered until 2013.

=== 21st century (2007–present) ===
Following Roshal's death, Mark Glukhovsky — who subsequently served as Executive Director of the Russian Chess Federation — took over as editor-in-chief from 2007 to 2014. In 2014, International Master Maxim Notkin, a chess journalist and long-time contributor, was appointed editor-in-chief, a position he continues to hold as of 2026.

As of March 2026, the magazine is actively publishing. Issue No. 3 of 2026 covers the Wijk aan Zee Masters and Challengers tournaments and the Russian junior championship. A digital PDF edition is available by subscription via the magazine's website and through the Russian Post subscription catalogue.

== Chess Oscar ==
The Chess Oscar is an international award given annually to the player judged by chess journalists worldwide to have been the best and most entertaining of the year. It was created in 1967 by Spanish journalist Jorge Puig Laborda and the Association Internationale de la Presse Echiqueenne (AIPE). The award was given from 1967 until 1988, then paused following Puig's death in 1989.

In 1995, Alexander Roshal and 64 revived the Chess Oscar. Under 64's administration, votes were solicited from international chess journalists and grandmasters from over 75 countries; a first-place vote was worth 13 points, second place 11 points, decreasing to one point for tenth place. The award was presented annually in Moscow. 64 administered the Chess Oscar from 1995 until 2013. The last award under 64's stewardship went to Magnus Carlsen for his performance in 2013 — his fourth consecutive Oscar.

== Editors-in-chief ==
- Nikolai Krylenko (1924–1938)
- (various editors) (1938–1967. wartime interruption 1941–1945)
- Tigran Petrosian (1968–1977)
- Anatoly Karpov (1980–1991)
- Alexander Roshal (1992–2007)
- Mark Glukhovsky (2007–2014)
- Maxim Notkin (since 2014)

== Publication details ==
64 is published monthly, with 12 issues per year. It covers classical chess tournaments, theoretical articles, game annotations, problem composition, draughts, and player interviews. A digital PDF subscription is available directly through the magazine's website (64.ru) and via the Russian Post subscription service. Print copies are available at select retailers in Russia.

== See also ==
- Chess Oscar
- Alexander Roshal
- List of chess periodicals
