= Alexander Roshal =

Soviet chess player, journalist, and magazine editor

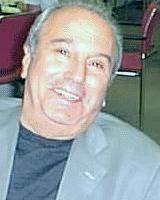
Alexander Roshal 2002 at Dortmund

Alexander Borisovich Roshal (Russian: Алекса́ндр Бори́сович Роша́ль; August 26, 1936, in Moscow – May 21, 2007, there) was a Soviet-born Russian chess player and journalist, the co-founder and editor of the magazine 64.
