= American Chess Bulletin =

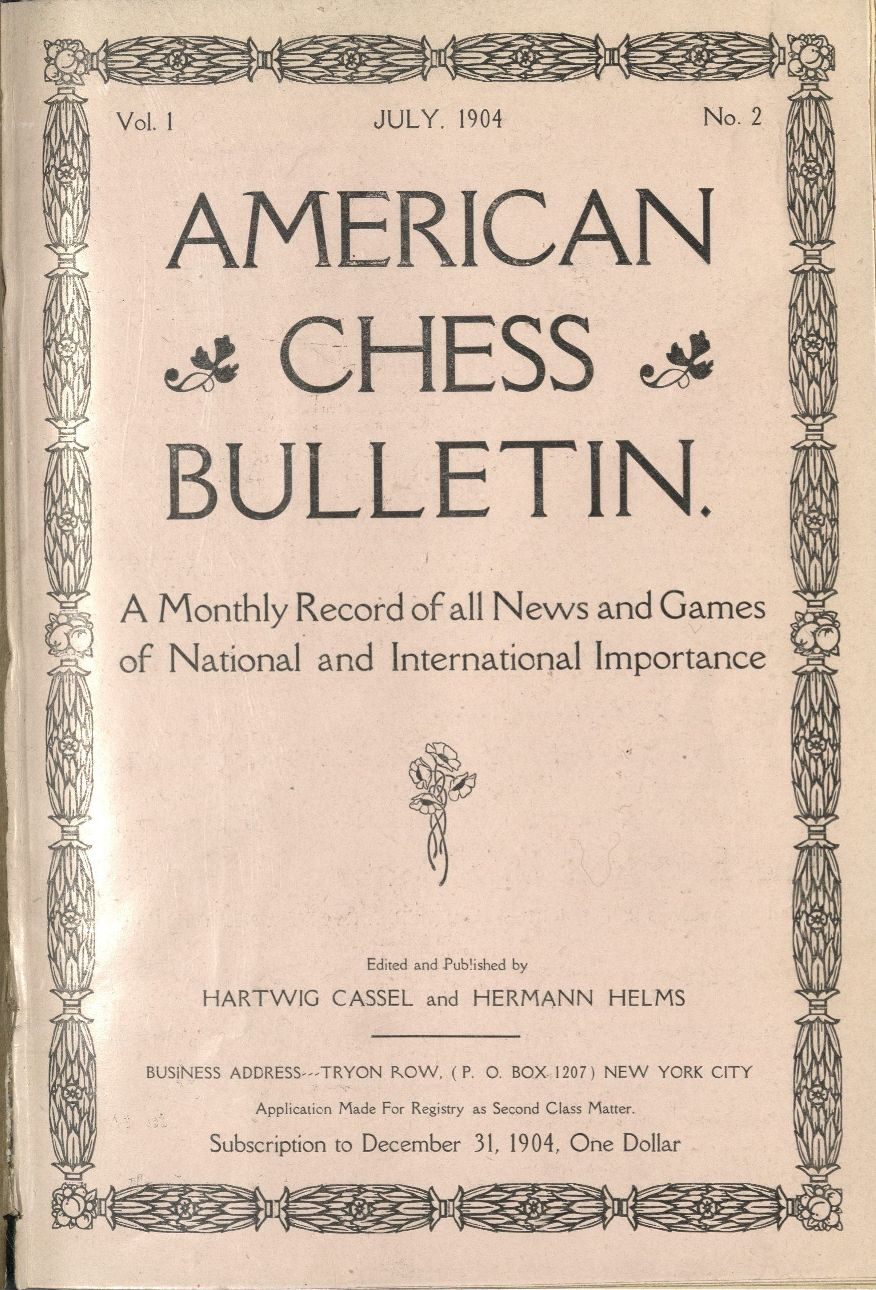
American Chess Bulletin, Vol. 01

The American Chess Bulletin was a chess periodical that was published monthly (November–April) and bi-monthly (May–October) from 1904 to 1962. It was published from New York City. The editor was Hermann Helms (1870–1963), who founded the magazine and edited it until his death, at which point publication ceased.

The first issue of the Bulletin, produced with Hartwig Cassel, was a report on the famous Cambridge Springs tournament held in 1904. As well as reporting on chess events, it also included news of the regional chess organisations that become the United States Chess Federation. After 1933, the North American Chess Reporter was merged with the Bulletin. Samuel Reshevsky was among those who contributed an article.
