= Anatoly Karpov =

Russian chess grandmaster (born 1951)

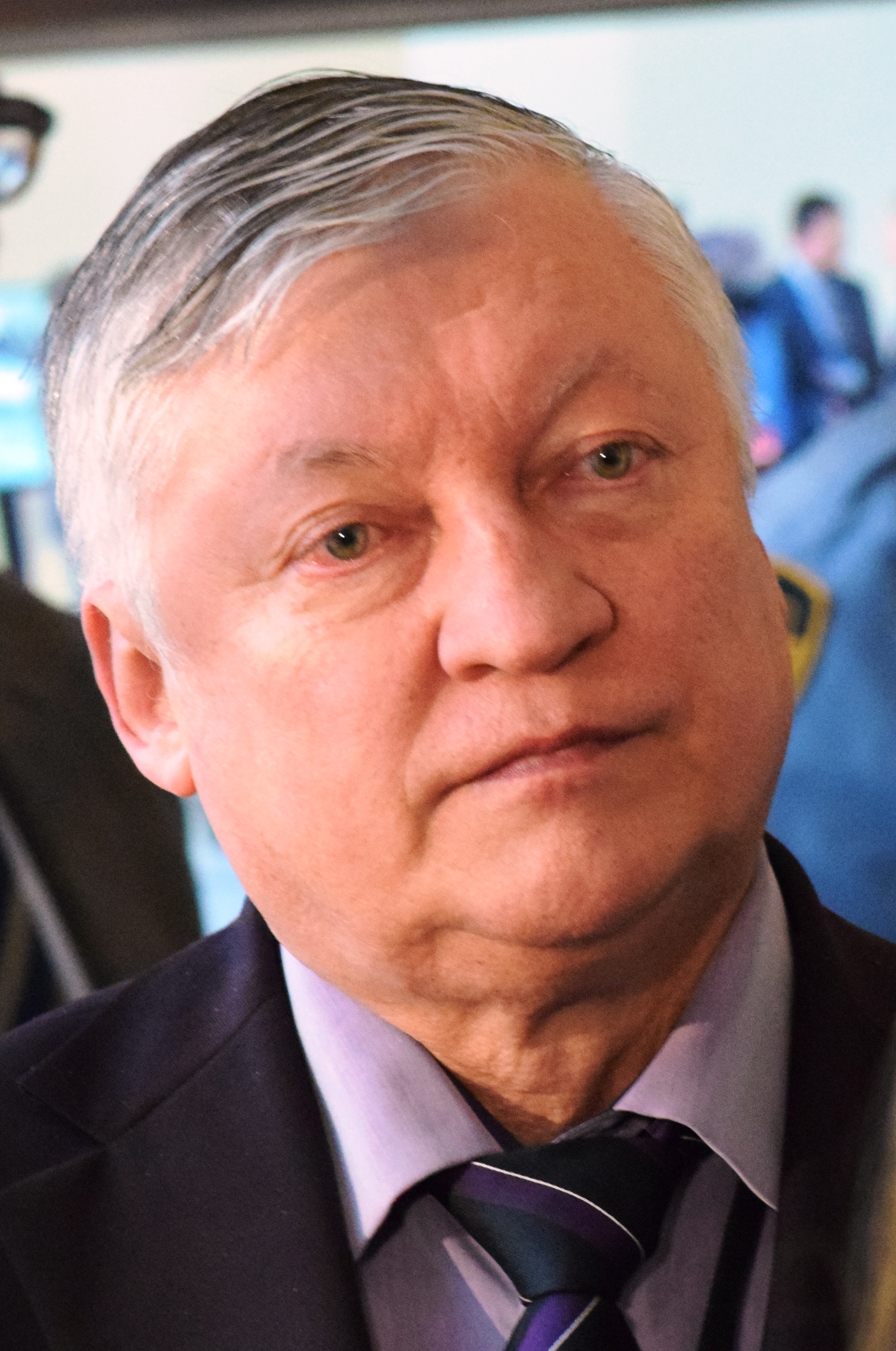
- Karpov in 2017

Personal information
- Native name: Анатолий Карпов
- Born: May 23, 1951 (age 75) Zlatoust, Chelyabinsk Oblast, Russian SFSR, Soviet Union

Chess career
- Country: Soviet Union (until 1991); Russia (since 1991)
- Title: Grandmaster (1970)
- World Champion: 1975–1985 (undisputed); 1993–1999 (FIDE)
- FIDE rating: 2617 (September 2026)
- Peak rating: 2780 (July 1994)
- Peak ranking: No. 1 (January 1976)
- Anatoly Karpov's voice from the Echo of Moscow program, March 9, 2006

Member of the State Duma for Tyumen Oblast's Party List
- Incumbent
- Assumed office December 21, 2011

Personal details
- Party: United Russia

Anatoly Yevgenyevich Karpov (Russian: Анатолий Евгеньевич Карпов, IPA: [ɐnɐˈtolʲɪj jɪvˈɡʲenʲjɪvʲɪtɕ ˈkarpəf]; born May 23, 1951) is a Russian and former Soviet chess grandmaster, former World Chess Champion, ⁣and politician. He was the 12th World Chess Champion, from 1975 to 1985, a three-time FIDE World Champion (1993, 1996, 1998), twice World Chess champion as a member of the USSR team (1985, 1989), a six-time winner of Chess Olympiads as a member of the USSR team (1972, 1974, 1980, 1982, 1986, 1988), and the 1st World Rapid Chess Champion (1988). The International Association of Chess Press awarded him nine Chess Oscars (1973–77, 1979, 1980, 1981, 1984).

For 25 consecutive years (1974–1998), Karpov was either the world champion (16 years in total) or a world championship challenger, a record surpassed only by Emanuel Lasker. Karpov's chess tournament successes include over 160 first-place finishes. He had a peak Elo rating of 2780, and his 102 total months world number one is the third-longest of all time, behind Magnus Carlsen and Garry Kasparov. Karpov is also an elected Member of the State Duma in Russia. Since 2006, he has chaired the Commission for Ecological Safety and Environmental Protection of the Civic Chamber of the Russian Federation, and since 2007 he has been a member of the Public Council under the Ministry of Defence. He is currently the oldest living World Chess Champion.

== Early life ==
Karpov was born into a Russian family on May 23, 1951, in Zlatoust, in the Urals region of the former Soviet Union, and learned to play chess at the age of four. His early rise in chess was swift, as he became a candidate master by age 11. At 12, he was accepted into Mikhail Botvinnik's prestigious chess school, despite Botvinnik saying that "[t]he boy does not have a clue about chess, and there's no future at all for him in this profession."

Karpov acknowledged that his understanding of chess theory was very confused at that time, and later wrote that the homework Botvinnik assigned greatly helped him, since it required that he consult chess books and work diligently. Karpov improved so quickly under Botvinnik's tutelage that he became the youngest Soviet master in history at the age of fifteen in 1966; this tied the record established by Boris Spassky in 1952.

== Career ==
=== Young master ===
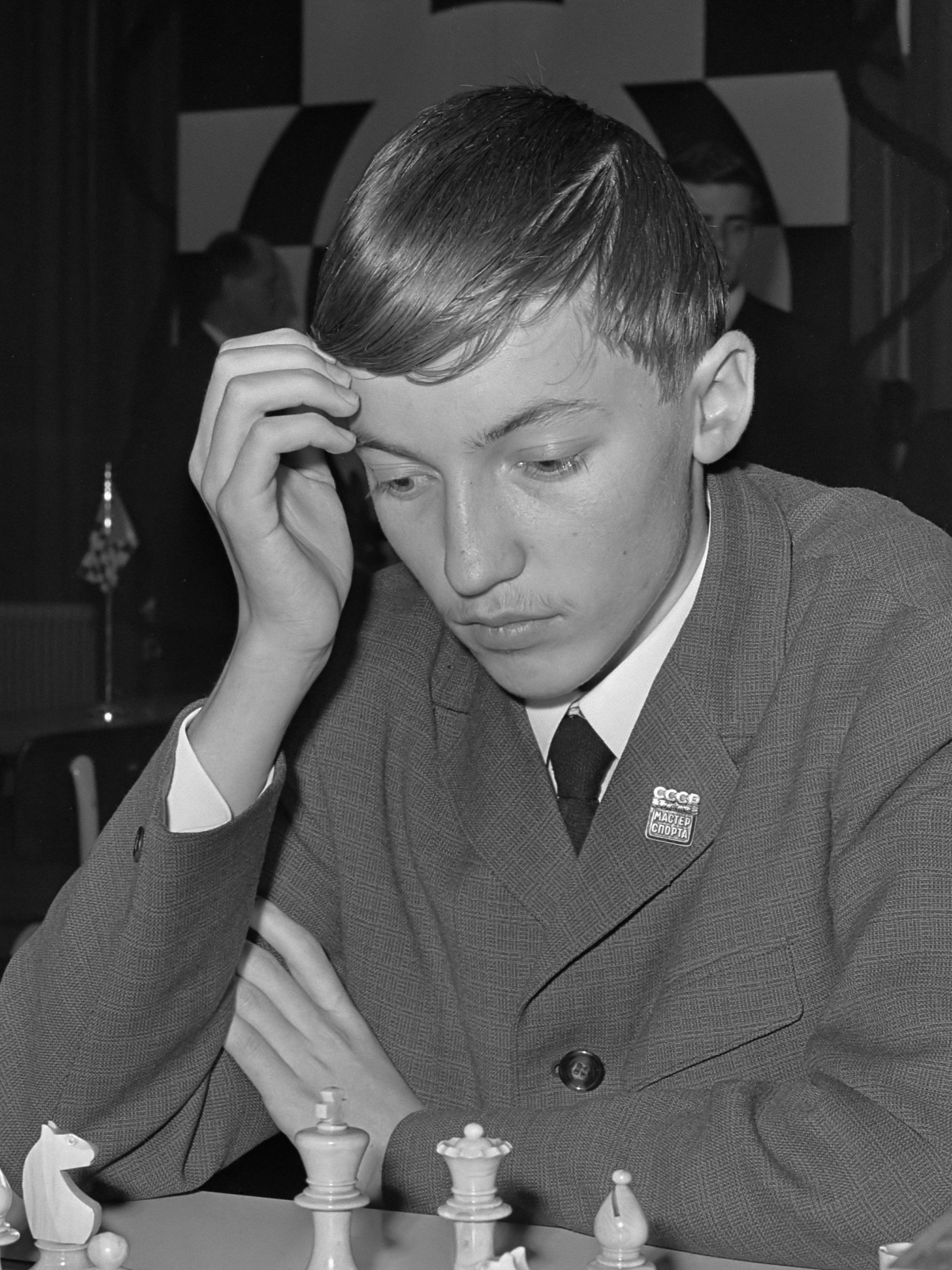
Karpov in 1967

During the presidency of Leonid Brezhnev, Karpov was one of the most famous and wealthiest citizens of the Soviet Union, and he is said to have owned one of only about four Mercedes-Benz cars in the Soviet Union. Karpov finished first in his first international tournament, in Třinec, several months later, ahead of Viktor Kupreichik. In 1967, he won the annual Niemeyer Tournament in Groningen. Karpov won a gold medal for academic excellence in high school, and entered Moscow State University in 1968 to study mathematics. He later transferred to Leningrad State University, eventually graduating from there in economics. One reason for the transfer was to be closer to his coach, grandmaster Semyon Furman, who lived in Leningrad. In his writings, Karpov credits Furman as a major influence on his development as a world-class player.

In 1969, Karpov became the first Soviet player since Spassky (1955) to win the World Junior Championship, scoring an undefeated 10/11 in the final A group at Stockholm. This victory earned him the International Master title. In 1970, Karpov tied for fourth and fifth places with Pal Benko at an international tournament in Caracas, Venezuela, and earned the international grandmaster title. FIDE awarded him the title during its 41st congress, held during the Chess Olympiad in Siegen, West Germany in September 1970.

=== Grandmaster ===
Karpov won the 1971 Alekhine Memorial tournament in Moscow (jointly with Leonid Stein), ahead of a star-studded field, for his first significant adult victory. His Elo rating shot from 2540 in 1971 to 2660 in 1973, during which he shared second place in the 1973 Soviet championship, one point behind Spassky, and qualified for the Leningrad Interzonal.

=== Candidate ===
Karpov's world junior championship qualified him for one of the two Interzonals, a stage in the 1975 World Championship cycle to choose the challenger to play world champion Bobby Fischer. He finished equal first in the Leningrad Interzonal, qualifying for the 1974 Candidates Matches.

Karpov defeated Lev Polugaevsky by the score of +3=5 in the first Candidates' match, earning the right to face former champion Boris Spassky in the semifinal round. Karpov was on record saying that he believed Spassky would easily beat him and win the Candidates' cycle to face Fischer, and that he (Karpov) would win the following Candidates' cycle in 1977. Spassky won the first game as Black in good style, but tenacious, aggressive play from Karpov secured him overall victory by +4−1=6.

The Candidates' final was played in Moscow with Victor Korchnoi. Karpov took an early lead, winning the second game against the Sicilian Dragon, then scoring another victory in the sixth game. Following ten consecutive draws, Korchnoi threw away a winning position in the seventeenth game to give Karpov a 3–0 lead. In game 19, Korchnoi succeeded in winning a long endgame, then notched a speedy victory after a blunder by Karpov two games later. Three more draws, the last agreed by Karpov when he was in a clearly better position, closed the match, with Karpov prevailing +3−2=19, entitling him to move on to challenge Fischer for the world title.

=== Match with Fischer in 1975 ===
Though a world championship match between Karpov and Fischer was highly anticipated, those hopes were never realised. Fischer not only insisted that the match be the first to ten wins (draws not counting), but also that the champion retain the crown if the score was tied 9–9. FIDE, the International Chess Federation, refused to allow this condition, and gave both players a deadline of April 1, 1975, to agree to play the match under the FIDE-approved rules. When Fischer did not agree, FIDE President Max Euwe declared on April 3, 1975, that Fischer had forfeited his title and Karpov was the new World Champion. Karpov later attempted to set up another match with Fischer, but the negotiations fell through. This thrust the young Karpov into the role of World Champion without having faced the reigning champion.

Garry Kasparov has argued that Karpov would have had good chances because he had beaten Spassky convincingly and was a new breed of tough professional, and indeed had higher quality games, while Fischer had been inactive for three years. This view is echoed by Karpov himself. Spassky thought that Fischer would have won in 1975, but Karpov would have qualified again and beaten Fischer in 1978. Karpov has said that if he had had the opportunity to play Fischer for the championship in his twenties, he could have been a much better player as a result.

=== World champion ===
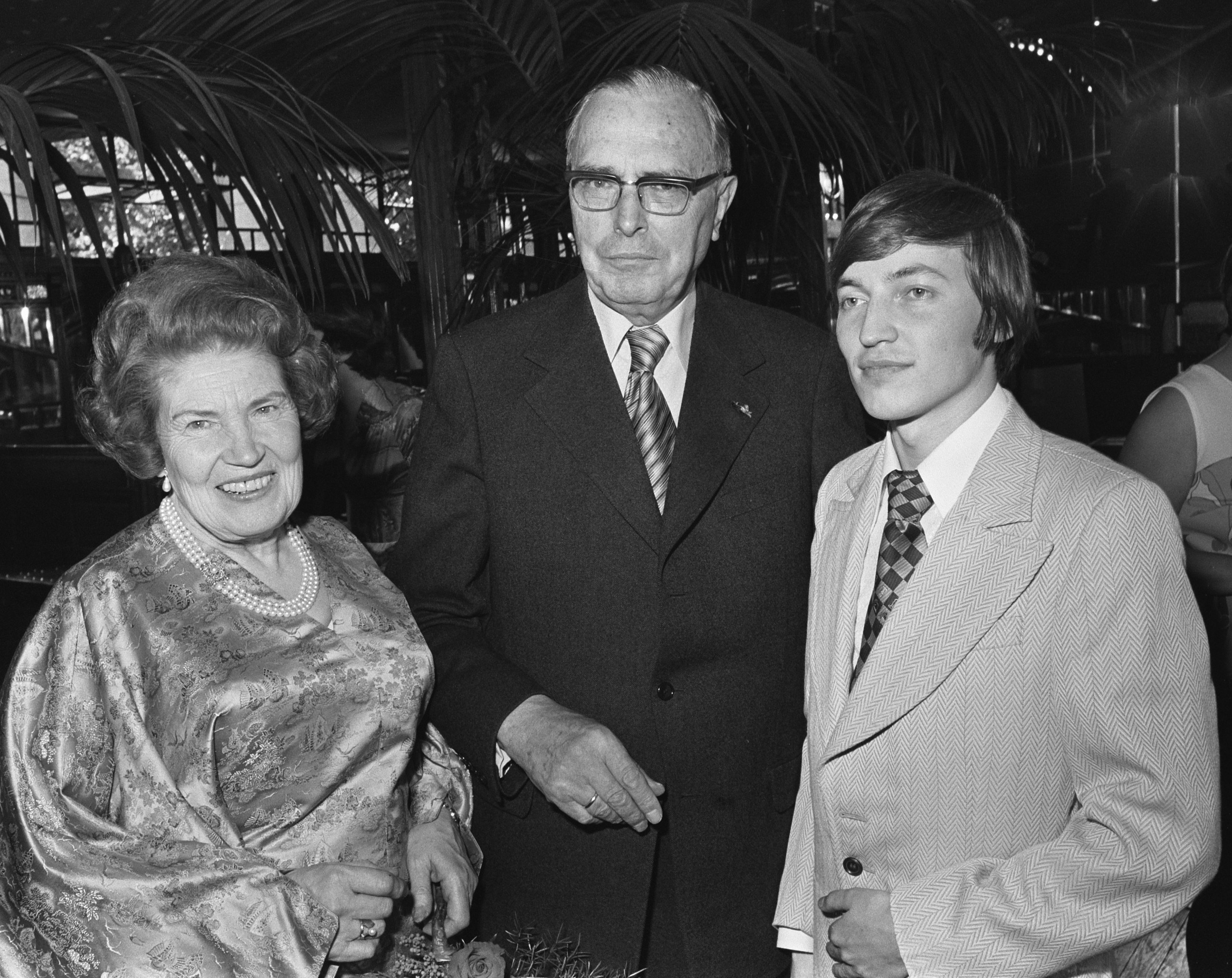
Karpov with FIDE president Max Euwe and wife in 1976

Determined to prove himself a legitimate champion, Karpov participated in nearly every major tournament for the next ten years. He convincingly won the Milan tournament in 1975, and captured his first of three Soviet titles in 1976. He created a phenomenal streak of tournament wins against the strongest players in the world. Karpov held the record for most consecutive tournament victories (9) until it was shattered by Garry Kasparov (15). As a result, most chess professionals soon agreed that Karpov was a legitimate world champion.

In 1978, Karpov's first title defence was against Viktor Korchnoi, the opponent he had defeated in the 1973–75 Candidates' cycle; the match was played at Baguio, Philippines, with the winner needing six victories. As in 1974, Karpov took an early lead, winning the eighth game after seven draws to open the match. When the score was +5−2=20 in Karpov's favour, Korchnoi staged a comeback, and won three of the next four games to draw level with Karpov. Karpov then won the very next game to retain the title (+6−5=21). Three years later, Korchnoi reemerged as the Candidates' winner against German finalist Robert Hübner to challenge Karpov in Merano, Italy. Karpov handily won this match, 11–7 (+6−2=10), in what is remembered as the "Massacre in Merano".

Karpov's tournament career reached a peak at the Montreal "Tournament of Stars" tournament in 1979, where he finished joint first (+7−1=10) with Mikhail Tal ahead of a field of strong grandmasters completed by Jan Timman, Ljubomir Ljubojević, Boris Spassky, Vlastimil Hort, Lajos Portisch, Robert Hübner, Bent Larsen and Lubomir Kavalek. He dominated Las Palmas in 1977 with 13½/15. He also won the prestigious Bugojno tournament in 1978 (shared), 1980 and 1986, the Linares tournament in 1981 (shared with Larry Christiansen) and 1994, the Tilburg tournament in 1977, 1979, 1980, 1982, and 1983, and the Soviet Championship in 1976, 1983, and 1988.

Karpov represented the Soviet Union at six Chess Olympiads, in all of which the USSR won the team gold medal. He played as the first reserve at Skopje 1972, winning the board prize with 13/15. At Nice 1974, he advanced to board one and again won the board prize with 12/14. At La Valletta 1980, he was again board one and scored 9/12. At Lucerne 1982, he scored 6½/8 on board one. At Dubai 1986, he scored 6/9 on board two. His last was Thessaloniki 1988, where on board two he scored 8/10. In Olympiad play, Karpov lost only two games out of 68 played. To illustrate Karpov's dominance over his peers as champion, his score was +13−1=22 versus Spassky, +8=19 versus Robert Hübner, +12−1=29 versus Ulf Andersson, +3−1=10 versus Vasily Smyslov, +1=19 versus Mikhail Tal, +19-7=23 versus Ljubomir Ljubojević.

=== Rivalry with Kasparov ===
Karpov had cemented his position as the world's best player and world champion by the time Garry Kasparov arrived on the scene. In their first match, the World Chess Championship 1984 in Moscow, the first player to win six games would win the match. Karpov built a 4–0 lead after nine games. The next 17 games were drawn, setting a record for world title matches, and it took Karpov until game 27 to gain his fifth win. In game 31, Karpov had a winning position but failed to take advantage and settled for a draw. He lost the next game, after which 14 more draws ensued. Karpov held a solidly winning position in Game 41, but again blundered and had to settle for a draw. After Kasparov won games 47 and 48, FIDE President Florencio Campomanes unilaterally terminated the match, citing the players' health. Karpov is said to have lost ten kilograms (22 lb) over the course of the match. A rematch was played later in 1985, also in Moscow. The events of the Marathon Match forced FIDE to return to the previous format, with a match limited to 24 games (with Karpov remaining champion if the match finished 12–12). Karpov needed to win the final game to draw the match and retain his title but lost, surrendering the title to his opponent. The final score was 13–11 (+3−5=16) in favour of Kasparov.

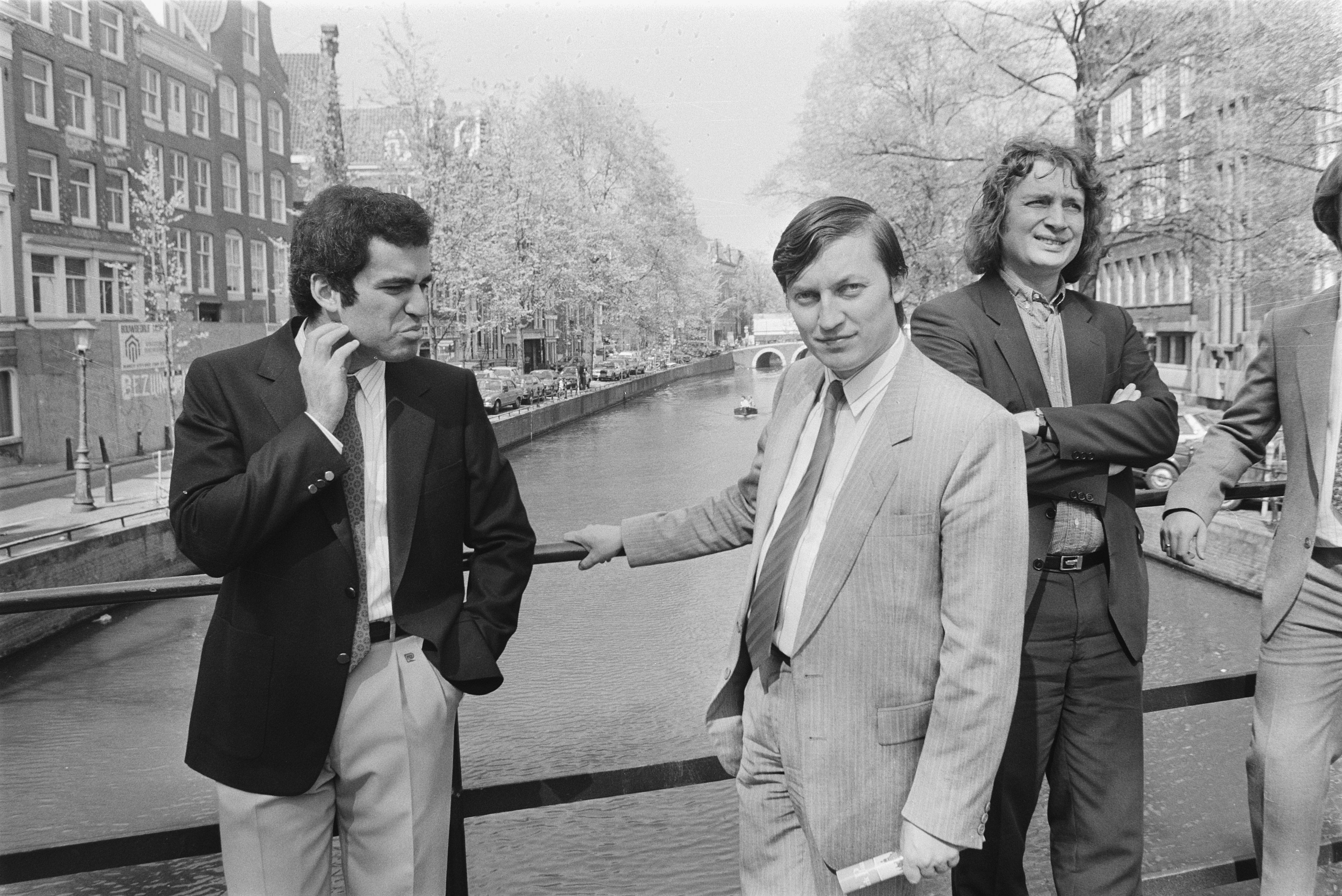
Karpov, with Kasparov (left) and Dutch Grandmaster Jan Timman (right) in Amsterdam, 1987

Karpov remained a formidable opponent and the world No. 2 until the mid-1990s. He fought Kasparov in three more world championship matches in 1986 (held in London and Leningrad), 1987 (in Seville), and 1990 (in New York City and Lyon). All three matches were extremely close: the scores were 11½–12½ (+4−5=15), 12–12 (+4−4=16), and 11½–12½ (+3−4=17). In all three matches, Karpov had winning chances up to the last games. The ending of the 1987 Seville match was particularly dramatic. Karpov won the 23rd game when Kasparov miscalculated a combination. In the final game, needing only a draw to win the title, Karpov cracked under time pressure at the end of the first session of play, missed a variation leading to an almost forced draw, and allowed Kasparov to adjourn the game with an extra pawn. After a further mistake in the second session, Karpov was slowly ground down and resigned on move 64, ending the match and allowing Kasparov to keep the title.

In their five world championship matches, Karpov scored 19 wins, 21 losses, and 104 draws in 144 games. Overall, Karpov played five matches against Kasparov for the title from 1984 to 1990 without ever defeating him in a match. According to chessgames.com, as of 2022, in Classical games, Kasparov leads Karpov with 28 wins, 20 losses, and 119 draws in 167 games. Including rapid/exhibition games, Kasparov leads Karpov with 39 wins, 25 losses, and 129 draws in 193 games.

=== FIDE champion again (1993–1999) ===
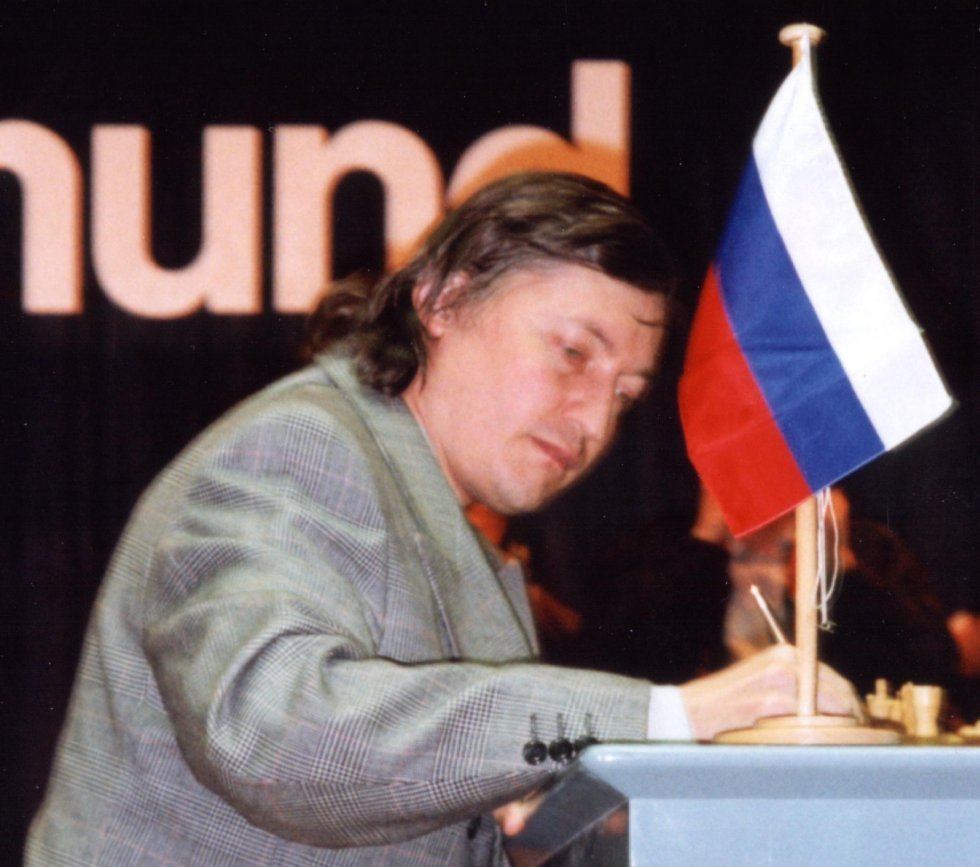
Karpov in 1993

In 1992, Karpov lost a Candidates Match against Nigel Short. But in the World Chess Championship 1993, Karpov reacquired the FIDE World Champion title when Kasparov and Short split from FIDE. Karpov defeated Timman – the loser of the Candidates' final against Short.

The next major meeting of Kasparov and Karpov was the 1994 Linares chess tournament. The field, in eventual finishing order, was Karpov, Kasparov, Shirov, Bareev, Kramnik, Lautier, Anand, Kamsky, Topalov, Ivanchuk, Gelfand, Illescas, Judit Polgár, and Beliavsky; with an average Elo rating of 2685, the highest ever at that time. Impressed by the strength of the tournament, Kasparov had said several days before the tournament that the winner could rightly be called the world champion of tournaments. Perhaps spurred on by this comment, Karpov played the best tournament of his life. He was undefeated and earned 11 points out of 13 (the best world-class tournament winning percentage since Alekhine won San Remo in 1930), finishing 2½ points ahead of second-place Kasparov and Shirov. Many of his wins were spectacular (in particular, his win over Topalov is considered possibly the finest of his career). This performance against the best players in the world put his Elo rating tournament performance at 2985, the highest performance rating of any player in history up until 2009, when Magnus Carlsen won the category XXI Pearl Spring chess tournament with a performance of 3002. Chess statistician Jeff Sonas considers Karpov's Linares performance the best tournament result in history.

Karpov defended his FIDE title against the rising star Gata Kamsky (+6−3=9) in 1996. In 1998, FIDE largely scrapped the old system of Candidates' Matches, instead having a large knockout event in which a large number of players contested short matches against each other over just a few weeks. In the first of these events, the FIDE World Chess Championship 1998, champion Karpov was seeded straight into the final, defeating Viswanathan Anand (+2−2=2, rapid tiebreak 2–0). In the subsequent cycle, the format was changed, with the champion having to qualify. Karpov refused to defend his title, and ceased to be FIDE World Champion after the FIDE World Chess Championship 1999.

=== Towards retirement ===
Karpov's classical tournament play has been seriously limited since 1997, since he prefers to be more involved in Russian politics. He had been a member of the Supreme Soviet Commission for Foreign Affairs and the president of the Soviet Peace Fund before the Soviet Union dissolved. In addition, he has been involved in several disputes with FIDE. In the September 2009 FIDE rating list, he dropped out of the world's Top 100 for the first time. Karpov usually limits his play to exhibition events, and has revamped his style to specialise in rapid chess. In 2002, he won a match against Kasparov, defeating him in a rapid time control match 2½–1½. In 2006, he tied for first with Kasparov in a blitz tournament, ahead of Korchnoi and Judit Polgár.

Karpov and Kasparov played a mixed 12-game match September 21–24, 2009, in Valencia, Spain. It consisted of four rapid (or semi-rapid) and eight blitz games and took place exactly 25 years after the two players' legendary encounter at the World Chess Championship 1984. Kasparov won the match 9–3. Karpov played a match against Yasser Seirawan in 2012 in St. Louis, Missouri, an important center of the North American chess scene, winning 8–6 (+5−3=6). In November 2012, he won the Cap d'Agde rapid tournament that bears his name (Anatoly Karpov Trophy), beating Vasyl Ivanchuk (ranked 9th in the October 2012 FIDE world rankings) in the final.

== Professional and political career after retirement from chess ==
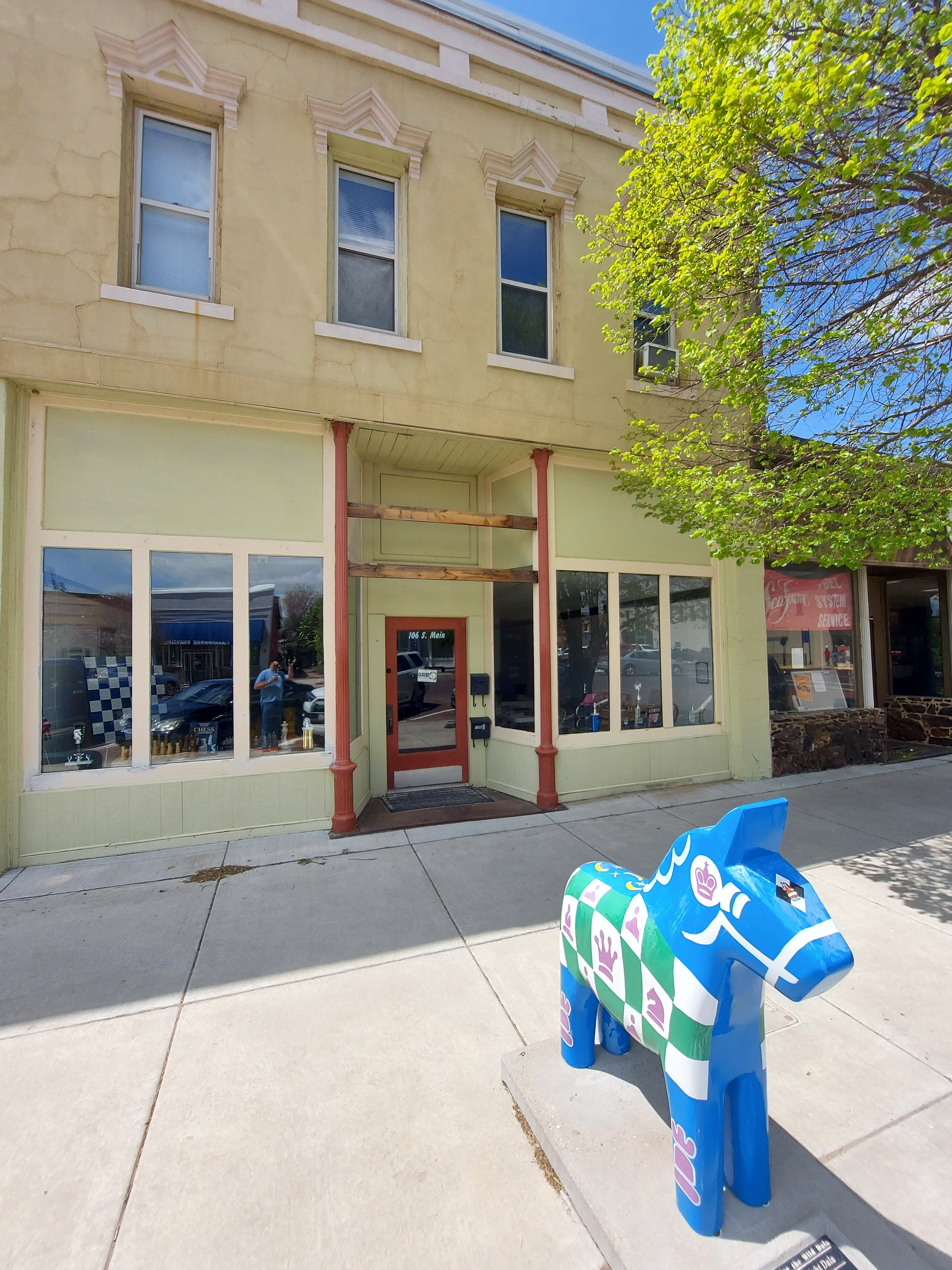
Karpov founded his chess school in the tan building. The sign bearing his name has been removed, and the school is in the process of changing its name.

In 2003, Karpov opened his first American chess school in Lindsborg, Kansas as the Anatoly Karpov International School of Chess. The school changed its name to International Chess Institute of the Midwest after the 2022 Russian invasion of Ukraine.

Karpov has been a member of the sixth, seventh and eighth Russian State Dumas. Since 2005, he has been a member of the Public Chamber of Russia. He has involved himself in several humanitarian causes, such as advocating the use of iodised salt. On December 17, 2012, Karpov supported the Dima Yakovlev Law banning adoption of Russian orphans by U.S. citizens.

Karpov expressed support of the unilateral annexation of Crimea by the Russian Federation, and accused Europe of trying to demonize Putin. In August 2019, Maxim Dlugy said that Karpov had been waiting since March for the approval of a non-immigrant visa to the United States, despite frequently visiting the country since 1972. Karpov had been scheduled to teach a summer camp at the Chess Max Academy. Dlugy said that Karpov had been questioned at the US embassy in Moscow about whether he planned to communicate with American politicians. Karpov was among the Russian State Duma members placed under sanctions by the EU and UK during the Russo-Ukrainian War. After the 2022 Russian invasion of Ukraine, the FIDE Council suspended Karpov's title of FIDE Ambassador for Life.

In November 2022, Karpov was placed in an induced coma after receiving a head injury. Karpov's daughter Sofia and the Russian Chess Federation said that he had accidentally fallen. Karpov made a full recovery from the injury.

== Candidate for FIDE presidency ==
In March 2010, Karpov announced that he would be a candidate for the presidency of FIDE. The election took place in September 2010 at the 39th Chess Olympiad. In May, a fundraising event took place in New York with the participation of Kasparov and Magnus Carlsen, who both supported his bid and campaigned for him. Nigel Short also supported Karpov's candidacy. On September 29, 2010, Kirsan Ilyumzhinov was reelected as president of FIDE, 95 votes to 55.

== Style ==
Karpov's playing style, described as a "boa constrictor", is solidly positional, taking minimal risks but reacting mercilessly to the slightest error by his opponent. As a result, he is often compared to José Raúl Capablanca, the third world champion. Karpov himself describes his style as follows:

Let us say the game may be continued in two ways: one of them is a beautiful tactical blow that gives rise to variations that don't yield to precise calculations; the other is clear positional pressure that leads to an endgame with microscopic chances of victory.... I would choose [the latter] without thinking twice. If the opponent offers keen play I don't object; but in such cases I get less satisfaction, even if I win, than from a game conducted according to all the rules of strategy with its ruthless logic.

== Notable games ==
- Anatoly Karpov vs Wolfgang Unzicker, Nice Olympiad Final-A (1974), Nice FRA, rd 4. Beginning with 24.Ba7!, Karpov puts a stranglehold on his opponent's position, gradually improving his position while Unzicker is helpless.
- Anatoly Karpov vs Viktor Korchnoi, Candidates Final (1974), Moscow URS, rd 2. Karpov plays the deflection tactic g5-Rd5 to force the win of material.
- Anatoly Karpov vs Gyula Sax, Linares (1983), Linares ESP, rd 3. Karpov sacrifices for an attack that wins the game 20 moves later, after another spectacular sacrifice from Karpov. It won the tournament's first brilliancy prize.
- Anatoly Karpov vs Garry Kasparov, World Championship Match (1984/85), Moscow URS, rd 9. Instead of recapturing his pawn, Karpov plays 47.Ng2!! in order to activate his king and infiltrate Black's position.
- Anatoly Karpov vs Veselin Topalov, Linares (1994), Linares ESP, rd 4. Karpov plays two exchange sacrifices in order to devastate Black's kingside. This game is known as Karpov's Immortal.
- Anatoly Karpov vs Veselin Topalov, Dos Hermanas (1994), Dos Hermanas ESP, rd 4. This game features a sham sacrifice of two pieces, forcing the win of an exchange for a technically won endgame.

== Hobbies ==
Karpov's extensive stamp collection of Belgian philately and Belgian Congo stamps and postal history covering mail from 1742 through 1980 was sold by David Feldman's auction company between December 2011 and 2012. He is also known to have large chess stamp and chess book collections. His private chess library consists of 9,000 books. Karpov is also an enthusiastic Backgammon player.

== Honours and awards ==
- Order of Merit for the Fatherland, 3rd class (2001) – for outstanding contribution to the implementation of charitable programmes, the strengthening of peace and friendship between the peoples
- Order of Friendship (2011) – for his great contribution to strengthening peace and friendship between peoples and productive social activities
- Order of Lenin (1981)
- Order of the Red Banner of Labour (1978)
- Order of Merit, 2nd class (Ukraine) (November 13, 2006) – for his contribution to the victims of the Chernobyl disaster
- Order of Holy Prince Daniel of Moscow, 2nd class (1996)
- Order of St. Sergius of Radonezh, 2nd class (2001)
- Medal "For outstanding contribution to the Collector business in Russia"
- Honorary member of the Soviet Philately Society (1979)
- Diploma of the State Duma of the Russian Federation No. 1
- Order "For outstanding achievements in sport" (Republic of Cuba)
- Medal of Tsiolkovsky Cosmonautics Federation of Russia
- Medal "For Strengthening the penal system", 1st and 2nd class
- Breastplate of the 1st degree of the Interior Ministry
- International Association of Chess Press, 9 times voted the best chess player of the year and awarded the "Chess Oscar"
- Order of Saint Nestor the Chronicler, 1st class
- Asteroid 90414 Karpov is named after Karpov
- Anatoly Karpov International Chess Tournament, an annual round-robin tournament held in his honour in Poikovsky, Khanty-Mansi Autonomous Okrug, Russia since 2000

== Books ==
Karpov has authored or co-authored several books, most of which have been translated into English.

- Karpov, A.E. Ninth vertical. 1978. Moscow: Molodaya Gvardia.
- Karpov, Anatoly; Roshal, Alexander (1979). Chess Is My Life. Pergamon Press. ISBN 0-0802-3119-5.
- Karpov, Anatoly (1988). The Open Game in Action. Batsford. ISBN 978-0713460964.
- Karpov, Anatoly (1988). The Semi-Open Game in Action. Collier. ISBN 978-0020218012.
- Karpov, Anatoly (1990). The Closed Openings in Action. Collier/MacMillan. ISBN 978-0020339854.
- Karpov, Anatoly (1990). The Semi-Closed Openings in Action. Collier/MacMillan. ISBN 978-0020218050.
- Karpov, Anatoly (1990). Karpov on Karpov: Memoirs of a chess world champion. Liberty Publishing. ISBN 0-689-12060-5. (also a 1992 Simon & Schuster edition)
- Karpov, Anatoly (1992). Beating the Grünfeld. Batsford. ISBN 978-0-7134-6468-9.
- Karpov, Anatoly (2006). Caro-Kann Defence: Advance Variation and Gambit System. Batsford. ISBN 0-7134-9010-1.
- Karpov, Anatoly (2007). My Best Games. Edition Olms. ISBN 978-3-2830-1002-7.
- Karpov, Anatoly; Henley, Ron (2007). Elista Diaries: Karpov–Kamsky, Karpov–Anand, Anand Mexico City 2007 World Chess Championship Matches. Batsford. ISBN 978-0-923891-97-8.
- Karpov, Anatoly (2007). How To Play The English Opening. Batsford. ISBN 978-0-7134-9065-7.

Awards
| Preceded by Bobby Fischer | World Chess Champion; 1975–1985 | Succeeded by Garry Kasparov |
| Preceded by Garry Kasparov | FIDE World Chess Champion; 1993–1999 | Succeeded by Alexander Khalifman |
Achievements
| Preceded by Bobby Fischer; Garry Kasparov | World No. 1 January 1, 1976 – December 31, 1983; July 1, 1985 – December 31, 1985 | Succeeded by Garry Kasparov; Garry Kasparov |
