= Chess columns in newspapers =

The earliest known chess column appeared in the Lancet in 1823, but due to lack of popularity disappeared after less than a year.

== Historical development ==
The first column to establish itself was that of George Walker in Bells Life in 1834 which survived until 1873. From February 15, 1845, onwards it faced competition from Howard Staunton's column in the Illustrated London News, a column which outlived Walker's, but only by 5 years. During this time a chess column also appeared in the Pictorial Times lasting from February 1845 to June 1848.

In 1882 Henry Bird in his Chess History and Reminiscences estimated that there were 150 chess columns. Less than thirty years later in 1913 H. J. R. Murray in his A History of Chess estimated there existed at least 1,000 chess columns worldwide.

George Koltanowski became the chess columnist for the San Francisco Chronicle, which carried his chess column every day for the next 52 years until his death, publishing an estimated 19,000 columns. American Grandmaster Robert Byrne wrote a column for The New York Times from 1972 to 2006. GM Lubomir Kavalek's column in The Washington Post ran from 1986 to 2010. GM Nigel Short wrote a chess column for the Sunday Telegraph from 1995 to 2005, and then for The Guardian from 2005 to 2006. GM Jon Speelman wrote for The Guardian from 2005 to 2008. GM Patrick Wolff was co-writing a column for the Boston Globe in 2012.

== Current day ==
In 2010, The Washington Post discontinued their Chess column which was written by Lubomir Kavalek.

Raymond Keene's column appears daily in The Times and Sunday Times. Bill Cornwall's "Chess: A Knight's Tour" has been published by Tribune since 1993, and appears in the Sun-Sentinel and Los Angeles Times.

A record of longevity has been achieved by Leonard Barden, who still writes weekly chess columns for The Guardian and has done since September 1955 (61 years as of August 2017), and daily columns for the London Evening Standard since June 1956 (61 years as of August 2017).

As of June 2022 the writer for the New York Times chess column is Daniel Naroditsky.

== Sources ==
- The main bibliographical source for chess columns is Ken Whyld's 'Chess Columns: A List' (Caissa-90, Olomouc, 2002).
