= World Chess Championship 1985 =

Chess match between Karpov and Kasparov

	Defending champion	Challenger
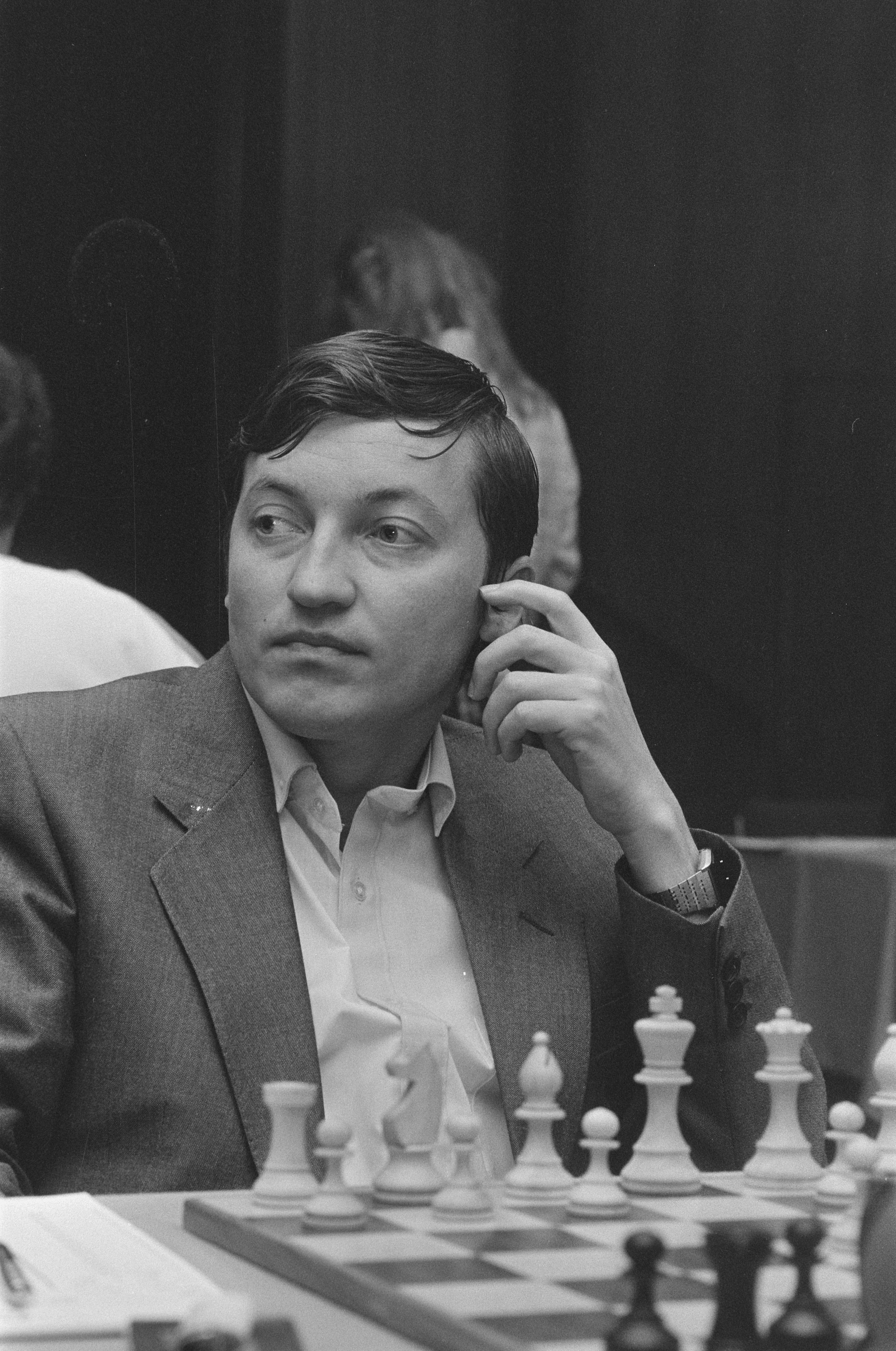
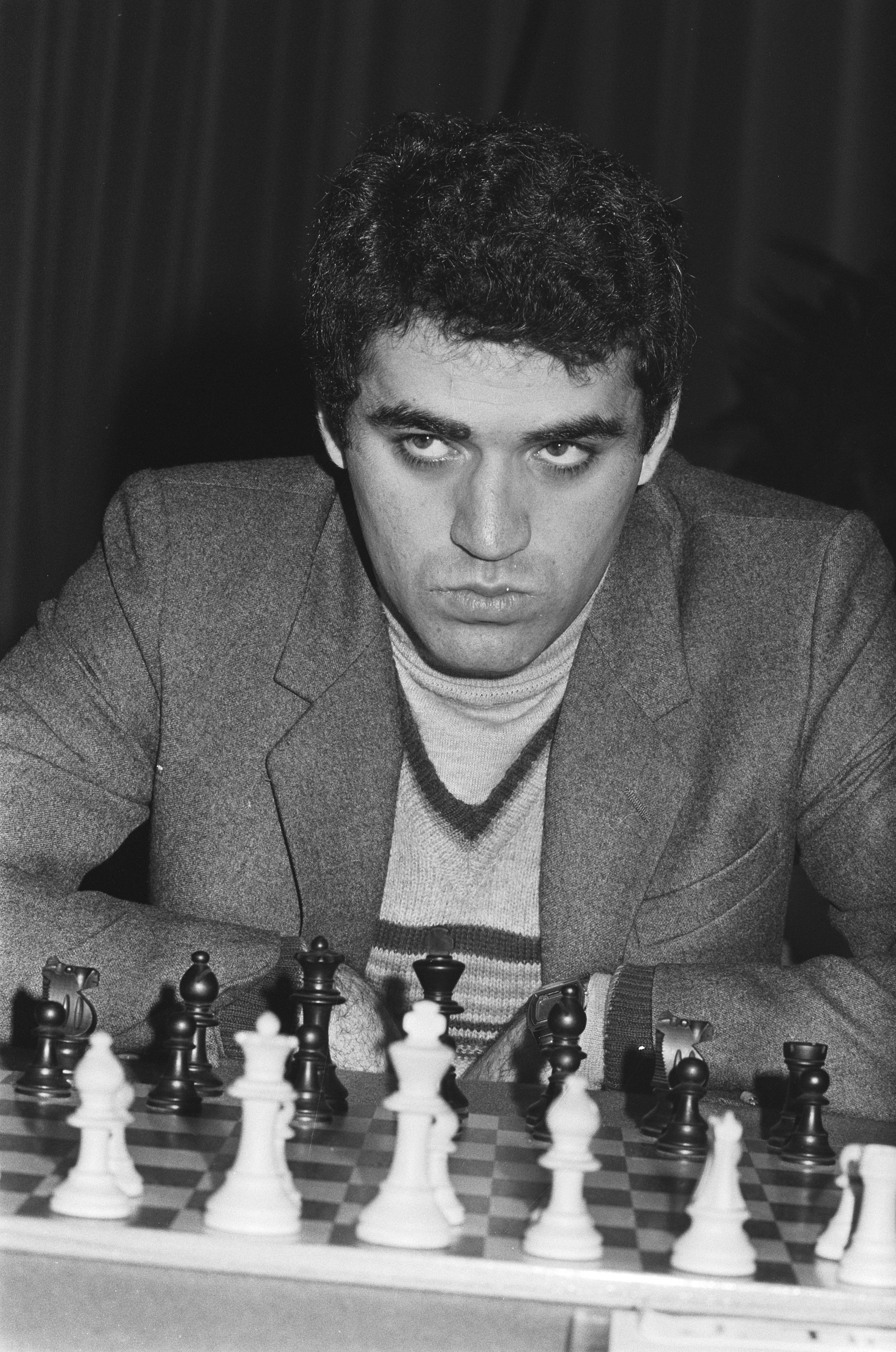
	Anatoly Karpov	Garry Kasparov
	(Soviet Union) Anatoly Karpov	(Soviet Union) Garry Kasparov
11	Scores	13
	Born 23 May 1951; 34 years old	Born 13 April 1963; 22 years old
	Winner of the 1981 World Chess Championship	Winner of the 1983 Candidates Tournament
	Rating: 2720 (World No. 1)	Rating: 2700 (World No. 2)

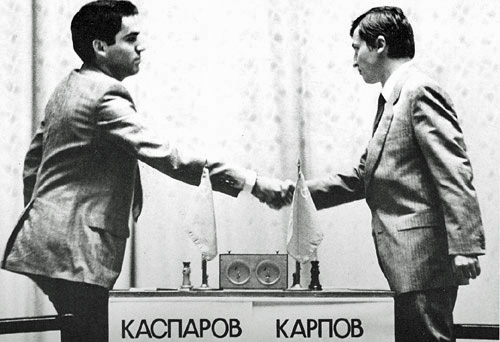
Kasparov and Karpov at the World Chess Championship 1985

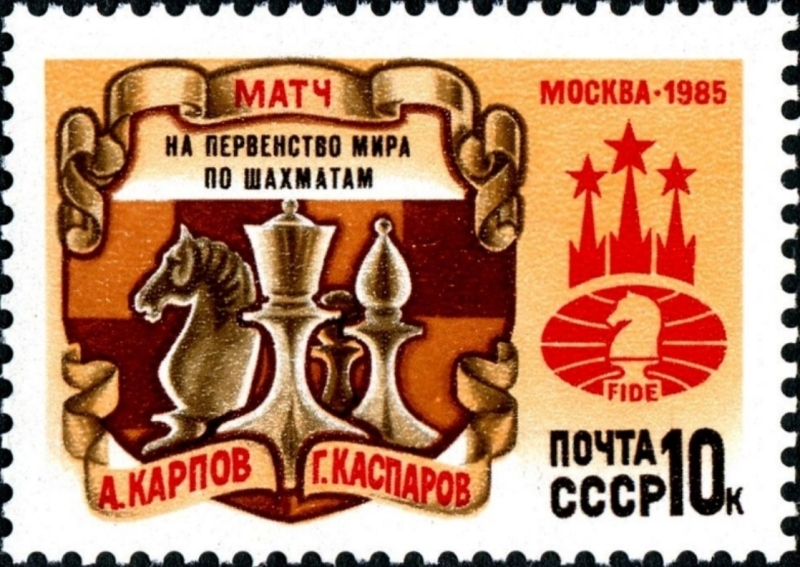
A Soviet stamp dedicated to the World Chess Championship 1985

The 1985 World Chess Championship was played between Anatoly Karpov and Garry Kasparov in Moscow, Soviet Union from September 3 to November 9, 1985. Kasparov won, to become the thirteenth and the then youngest world champion at the age of 22.

== Background ==
The 1985 World Chess Championship followed only 7 months after the highly controversial finish of the 1984 championship between the same players. On 8 February 1985, after 48 games had been contested over 5 months, the 1984 championship was abandoned with no result, becoming the first, and thus far only, chess world championship to finish in this way. Politics gave another angle to the Kasparov–Karpov encounters. Due to the changing political climate in Russia at the time, the matches were often depicted as a clash of ideologies, between "new Russia" represented by Kasparov and Mikhail Gorbachev and "old Russia" represented by Karpov and Communists such as Leonid Brezhnev.

=== The players ===
At the time of the match, Karpov had a FIDE rating of 2720, while Kasparov was close behind with a rating of 2700. There was a large difference in age between the two players, with Karpov (34) the older by 12 years.

Between the end of the 1984 match and the start of the 1985 match, Kasparov played matches against Robert Hübner in Germany, winning three games and drawing three, and against Ulf Andersson in Sweden, winning two games and drawing four.

Karpov also showed that he was still in good form when he won the 1985 OHRA tournament in Amsterdam with 7/10, not losing a game and winning four.

As in previous World Chess Championships, each of the contestants employed other chess players as "seconds" to help with preparation and analysis of adjourned games. Karpov's seconds were Grandmasters Sergey Makarichev and Igor Zaitsev. Other assistance was provided by Efim Geller and Evgeni Vasiukov. Kasparov's seconds were Grandmaster Josif Dorfman and Alexander Nikitin with Gennadi Timoshchenko and Evgeny Vladimirov also helping.

=== The match ===
The 1985 championships represented a restart of the abandoned match. Due to the extreme duration of the previous match, FIDE agreed at a meeting in Tunisia in July 1985 that the re-arranged championship would be of fixed length, played as the best of 24 games. If the match had ended at a 12–12 draw, Karpov would have retained his title. As Karpov had been leading the 1984 championships, he was also granted an automatic rematch if he lost.

The playing regulations were that 40 moves should be made by each player in 2 hours 30 minutes, with games being adjourned to the following day after 40 moves were completed.

Kasparov's preferred venue was Leningrad and bids for the match had been received from London and Marseille. In the end, with the backing of the Soviet Chess Federation, FIDE selected Moscow's Tchaikovsky Concert Hall as the venue for the match.

The opening ceremony was held on 2 September, at which the draw for colours was made and won by Kasparov. This meant that he took the white pieces in Game 1, which started on 3 September 1985.

== The games ==
=== Game 1 and 2 – Karpov "stunned" ===
Kasparov–Karpov, Game 1

Position: a8 black rook, b8 black knight, c8 black bishop, d8 black queen, e8 black king, h8 black rook, a7 black pawn, b7 black pawn, d7 black pawn, f7 black pawn, g7 black pawn, h7 black pawn, e6 black pawn, f6 black knight, c5 black pawn, b4 black bishop, c4 white pawn, d4 white pawn, c3 white knight, f3 white knight, g3 white pawn, a2 white pawn, b2 white pawn, e2 white pawn, f2 white pawn, h2 white pawn, a1 white rook, c1 white bishop, d1 white queen, e1 white king, f1 white bishop, h1 white rook

This position, after Kasparov had played 5. g3, had not been faced by Karpov before.

In Kasparov's own words, his choice of opening for game 1 "stunned" Karpov, as the position after only 4 moves was one that had not appeared in any of their previous games. Indeed, the position after move 5 had never previously appeared in any game that Karpov had played, and Karpov's first five moves took him 50 minutes to play. Kasparov won the game in 42 moves.

Karpov took White in game 2, which was drawn in 65 moves. Kasparov's analysis suggests that he could have won the game.

=== Games 3 to 5 – Karpov turns the tables ===
Game 3 was again drawn, this time in only 20 moves with few chances for either side. Game 4 was won by Karpov as White in 63 moves. Kasparov noted that "the entire plan [after Black's 21st move] was put into practice by Karpov extremely strongly and consistently." In game 5, Kasparov played with the white pieces and made a number of mistakes and Karpov won in 41 moves. This meant that Karpov had moved from a one-point deficit to a one-point lead in just three days.

Kasparov resolved at this stage "to play as resolutely as possible" and "to go in for a complicated struggle in order to regain the match initiative and if possible wear out my opponent".

=== Games 6 to 15 – Kasparov equalises ===
Kasparov-Karpov, Game 11

Position: c8 black rook, g8 black king, a7 black pawn, b7 black bishop, d7 black rook, f7 black pawn, g7 black pawn, b6 black pawn, c6 black knight, f6 black queen, h6 black pawn, d5 white bishop, g4 white queen, a3 white pawn, f3 white knight, g3 white pawn, b2 white pawn, f2 white pawn, g2 white pawn, d1 white rook, e1 white rook, g1 white king

Karpov played 22...Rcd8?? which was met by 23. Qxd7 Rxd7 24. Re8+ Kh7 25. Be4+ winning two rooks and a minor piece for a queen after 25...g6 26. Rxd7.

After such a flurry of excitement, it is perhaps understandable that the players regrouped in the following game, which was a short 27-move draw. The following four games also ended in draws, with Karpov having slightly the worse of at least two games, but with Kasparov unable to force a victory.

Kasparov reports speaking to grandmaster Andras Adorjan after game 10, lamenting the opportunities he felt he had missed in games 7, 9 and 10. Adorjan stated 'The main thing is not the score, but the trend, which, in my opinion is favourable'. Adorjan's statement came true in game 11, which was won by Kasparov in just 25 moves, following an oversight by Karpov on move 22.

Games 12, 13 and 15 were all drawn quickly. Game 14 also ended in a draw after forceful and accurate play on both sides. Kasparov later rated game 14 as "perhaps the 'cleanest' game of the match".

So the scores after 15 games were level at 7½–7½, and the match was already past the halfway point.

=== Game 16 – Kasparov's masterpiece ===
The first 10 moves of game 16 were identical to those from game 12. Karpov was the first to deviate, but Kasparov had analysed the position deeply in his preparation before the match, and was able to take the initiative, despite playing with the black pieces.

Kasparov's positioning of a knight deep in his opponent's position on move 16 (see first diagram) was ultimately decisive. The knight remained in place until move 34, when Karpov sacrificed his queen to remove it.

Chess Informant readers selected this game as the best game of the first 64 issues.

The game progressed as follows (notes based on Kasparov's analysis):

Karpov–Kasparov, Game 16

Position: a8 black rook, d8 black queen, e8 black rook, g8 black king, f7 black pawn, g7 black pawn, h7 black pawn, a6 black pawn, f6 black knight, b5 black pawn, c5 black bishop, d5 white pawn, f5 black bishop, g5 white bishop, a3 white knight, c3 white knight, d3 black knight, f3 white bishop, a2 white pawn, b2 white pawn, d2 white queen, f2 white pawn, g2 white pawn, h2 white pawn, d1 white rook, f1 white rook, g1 white king

Position after 16...Nd3. Suddenly, Kasparov's knight has become very powerful.

1.e4 c5 2.Nf3 e6 3.d4 cxd4 4.Nxd4 Nc6 5.Nb5 d6 6.c4 Nf6 7.N1c3 a6 8.Na3 d5 9.cxd5 exd5 10.exd5 Nb4 11.Be2 Bc5

This move is no longer played at the top level as it was found shortly after the game that White can play 12.Be3 Bxe3 13 Qa4+ retaining the extra pawn without the difficulties encountered in this game.

12.O-O O-O 13.Bf3 Bf5

After 13. Bg5 Nbxd5 14. Nxd5 Qxd5 15. Bxf6 Qxd1 16. Rfxd1 gxf6, Black should draw easily. Kasparov commented that he thought Karpov felt obliged to play for the win in this position.

14.Bg5 Re8 15.Qd2 b5 16.Rad1 Nd3 (diagram)

Black's knight lands on a very powerful square.

17.Nab1

Karpov could have played more actively here. 17. d6 would have been better, although Black's position is still superior after 17. ... Qxd6 18. Bxa8 Rxa8.

17...h6 18.Bh4 b4 19.Na4 Bd6

Kasparov said that he had reached this position in his home preparation: "A position for which I had aimed in my preparatory analysis! Black has achieved obvious advantage [sic]. White scattered his minor pieces about on either flank and are quite unable to coordinate, the placement of the knights being particularly depressing. But Black has the wonderful duo of Bf5 and Nd3 which completely paralyzes all three White major pieces—a very rare occurrence in a practical game!"

Karpov–Kasparov, Game 16

Position: f7 black pawn, g7 black king, h6 black pawn, b4 black pawn, g4 white pawn, b3 white pawn, d3 white rook, g3 white pawn, d2 white knight, f2 black queen, g2 white bishop, h2 white pawn, d1 white knight, e1 black rook, h1 white king

Final position after 40...Re1+. White cannot avoid being checkmated.

20.Bg3 Rc8 21.b3 g5 22.Bxd6 Qxd6 23.g3 Nd7 24.Bg2 Qf6 25.a3 a5 26.axb4 axb4 27.Qa2 Bg6 28.d6 g4 29.Qd2 Kg7 30.f3

Kasparov has slowly been building up the pressure on Karpov's position, and Karpov finally decides to try to break out.

30...Qxd6 31.fxg4 Qd4+ 32.Kh1 Nf6 33.Rf4 Ne4 34.Qxd3

The knight is finally taken from d3, but it costs Karpov his queen.

34...Nf2+ 35.Rxf2 Bxd3 36.Rfd2 Qe3 37.Rxd3

Karpov now has three pieces for the queen — normally a reasonable exchange, but his pieces are not sufficiently coordinated to counter Kasparov's attack on his exposed king.

37..Rc1 38.Nb2 Qf2 39.Nd2 Rxd1+ 40.Nxd1 Re1+ 0-1 (see second diagram)

Karpov resigns, as checkmate is unavoidable: no matter which piece blocks the check, Black plays 41...Rxf1+, followed by 42...Qxf1#

=== Games 17 to 23 – Honours even ===
Games 17 and 18 were short draws. In game 19, Karpov, with the black pieces, adopted an unusual opening strategy which eventually backfired on him. Kasparov won the game in 42 moves, to extend his lead to 2 points. With Kasparov now needing only four draws from five games to become World Champion, Karpov needed to start winning games.

In game 20, Karpov fought hard to force a victory, but was unable to win the game, and a draw was agreed after 85 moves. Game 21 also ended in a draw, this time with Kasparov generally in the ascendancy for the majority of the game.

In game 22, Kasparov made a serious mistake from a good position, and lost the game after further mistakes from both sides.

Game 23 ended in a draw, leaving Kasparov on 12 points against Karpov's 11. Karpov needed to win with the white pieces to retain the title.

=== Game 24 – Karpov's must-win game ===
Everything was to be decided in the final game, where Karpov needed a win to even the match and retain the title. This was reminiscent of the 30th game of the Euwe vs Alexander Alekhine 1935's match, in that the latter was too in a 'must win' situation.

Kasparov called game 24 the "game of his life" and has stated that working out the strategy for this encounter was difficult for him. His playing style did not lend itself to playing for a draw, so he decided to accept an open battle, with chances on both sides.

Karpov began a direct attack on Kasparov's king as early as move 15, and had chances to build up a strong attack. Kasparov sacrificed a pawn to blunt the attack and then a second pawn to launch a blistering counterattack. Under pressure from the clock, Karpov made decisive errors on move 36 and move 40. Kasparov won the World Championship after Karpov resigned on move 42.

== Results ==
The match was played as the best of 24 games. If it had ended 12–12, Karpov would have retained his title.

World Chess Championship Match 1985
	Rating	1	2	3	4	5	6	7	8	9	10	11	12	13	14	15	16	17	18	19	20	21	22	23	24	Points
Garry Kasparov (Soviet Union)	2700	1	½	½	0	0	½	½	½	½	½	1	½	½	½	½	1	½	½	1	½	½	0	½	1	13
Anatoly Karpov (Soviet Union)	2720	0	½	½	1	1	½	½	½	½	½	0	½	½	½	½	0	½	½	0	½	½	1	½	0	11

== See also ==
- List of chess games

== Cited sources ==
- Kasparov, Garry (1986). Garry Kasparov: New World Chess Champion. Pergamon Press. ISBN 0-08-034044-X.
- Kasparov, Garry (2008). My Great Predecessors#Modern Chess: Part 2, Kasparov vs Karpov 1975-1985. Everyman Chess. ISBN 978-1-85744-433-9.
