= Zoltán Ribli =

Hungarian chess grandmaster (born 1951)

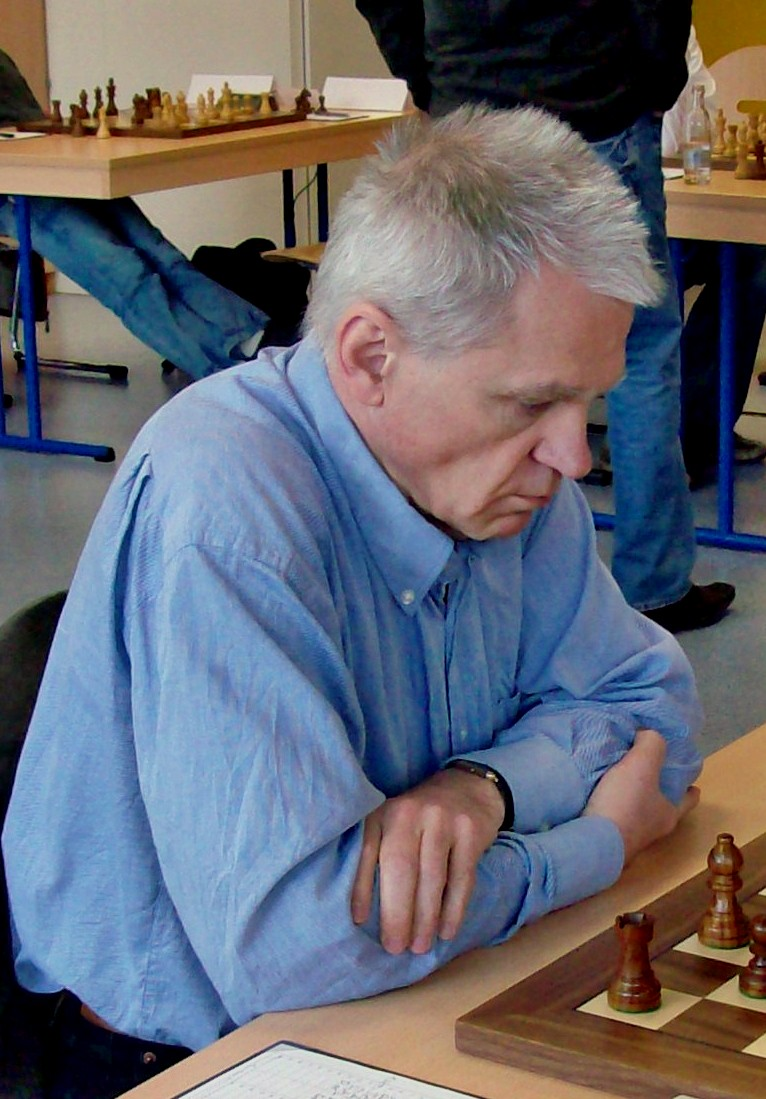

Personal information
- Born: September 6, 1951 (age 74) Mohács, Hungary
- Spouse: Mária Grosch

Chess career
- Country: Hungary
- Title: Grandmaster (1973)
- FIDE rating: 2475 (July 2026)
- Peak rating: 2625 (January 1989)
- Peak ranking: No. 8 (July 1988)

Zoltán Ribli (born September 6, 1951, in Mohács) is a Hungarian chess grandmaster and International Arbiter (1995). He was twice a World Championship Candidate and three times Hungarian Champion.

== A career in chess ==
As a youngster, he was twice the European Junior Champion, in 1968/69 (shared) and 1970/71. In domestic competition, he has been three times the national champion of Hungary, sharing the honours in 1973, 1974 and 1977.

Ribli's International Master and Grandmaster titles were awarded in 1970 and 1973, respectively.

At the peak of his career, Ribli was twice a candidate for the World Championship, in 1984 and 1986. At London in 1984, he participated in the high-profile match between USSR and the Rest of the World, defeating his Soviet counterpart, Rafael Vaganian by a narrow margin.

In 1983, Ribli defeated Torre (+3-1=6) in the quarter-final Candidates Match, but lost to Vasily Smyslov (+1-3=7) in the semi-final. Smyslov played against Garry Kasparov in the final, which Smyslov lost.

Ribli became a fearsome competitor on the international tournament circuit of the 1970s and 1980s, chalking up victories at Kecskemét 1972 (with Suetin), Budapest 1975 (with Polugaevsky), Mexico 1980, Baden-Baden 1981 (with Miles), Portorož/Ljubljana 1985 (Vidmar Memorial, with Miles and Portisch), Dortmund 1986, Reggio Emilia 1987, and Wijk aan Zee 1989 (with Anand, Sax and Nikolić). Runner-up results include Amsterdam 1978 (behind Timman), Bled/Portorož 1979 (with Larsen, behind Timman), Wijk aan Zee 1983 (behind Andersson), Bugojno 1984 (behind Timman) and Tilburg 1984 (with Beliavsky, Hübner and Tukmakov, behind Miles).

Whilst not so active in tournament play during the 1990s and 2000s, he nevertheless maintained a competitive rating (his July 2006 Elo rating was 2589) and has shown that he can still win grandmaster events, such as the Hotel Opatija tournament in Kastav, Croatia in 2002.

An almost ever-present member of the Hungarian Olympiad team between 1970 and 1994, Ribli was playing second board when Hungary won the team gold medal in 1978. He also won team silver medals in 1970, 1972 and 1980.

As a writer on the topic of chess, his analysis and tournament reports have been published in magazine articles around the world. Additionally, he co-authored two books with Gabor Kallai: Winning with the Queen's Indian (Batsford, 1987) and Winning with the English (Batsford, 1993). Ribli has also been coaching Austrian national teams.

Zoltán Ribli is married to Woman International Master Mária Grosch.
