= World Chess Championship 1984–1985 =

Chess match between Kasparov and Karpov

	Defending champion	Challenger
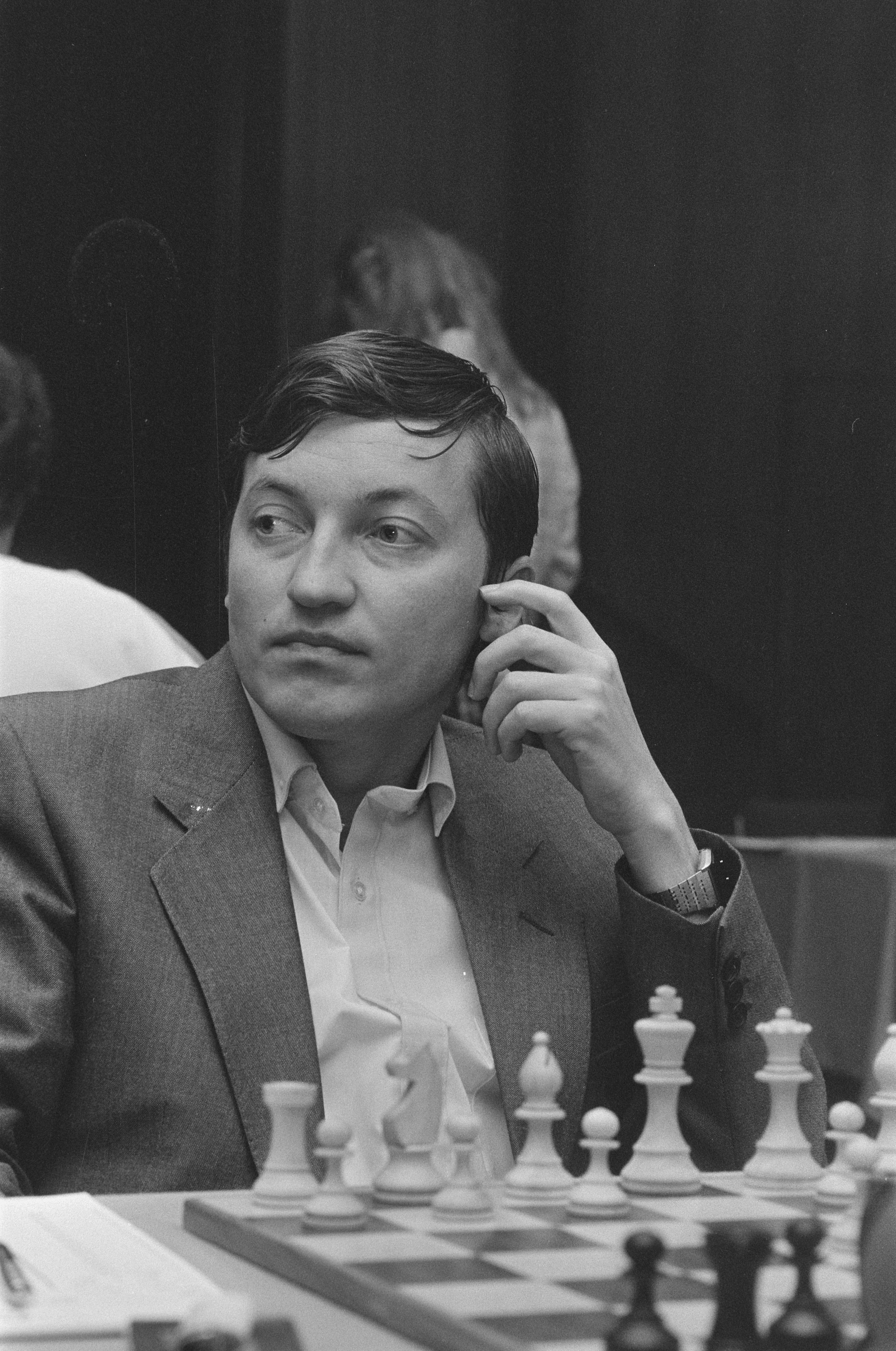
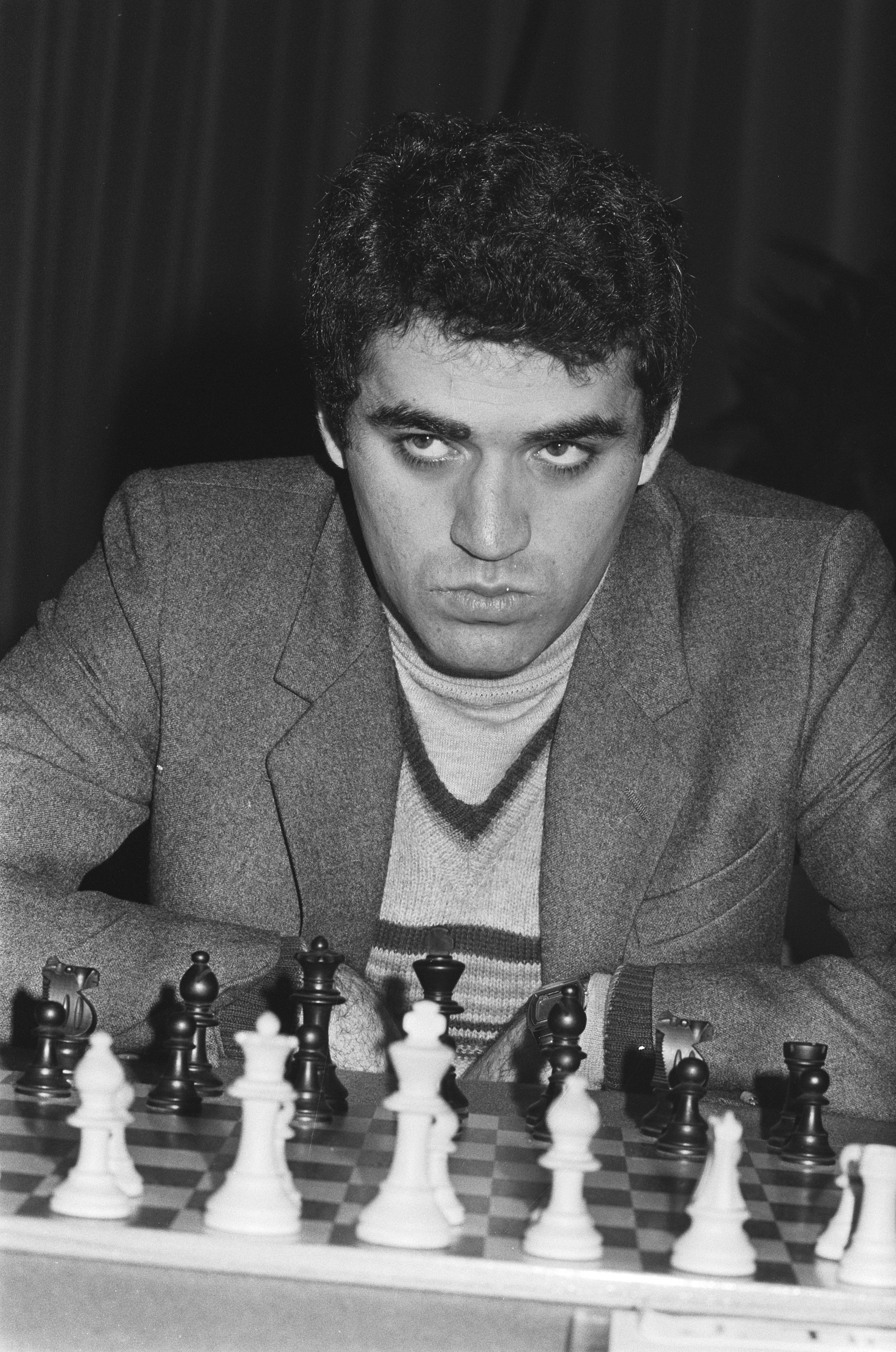
	Anatoly Karpov	Garry Kasparov
	(Soviet Union) Anatoly Karpov	(Soviet Union) Garry Kasparov
5*	Scores	3*
	Born 23 May 1951; 33 years old	Born 13 April 1963; 21 years old
	Winner of the 1981 World Chess Championship	Winner of the 1983 Candidates Tournament
	Rating: 2700 (World No. 2)	Rating: 2710 (World No. 1)

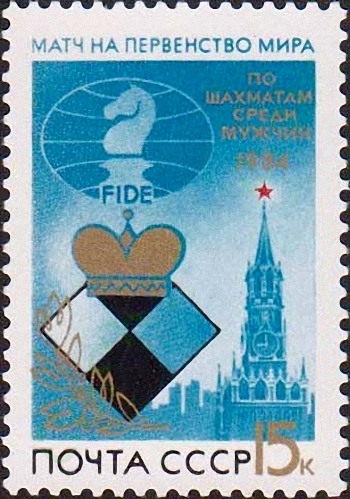
A Soviet stamp dedicated to the World Chess Championship 1984

The World Chess Championship 1984–1985 was a match between challenger Garry Kasparov and defending champion Anatoly Karpov at the Pillar Hall of House of the Unions, Moscow, from 10 September 1984 to 15 February 1985 for the World Chess Championship title. Svetozar Gligoric was the chief arbiter for the match. After 5 months and 48 games, the match was called off, with Karpov leading 5 to 3, and 40 draws. The match was replayed in the World Chess Championship 1985.

== 1981-82 Zonals ==
There were three different paths to the Interzonals. First, players qualified from twelve different Zonals. Second, some players (including Kasparov) qualified on rating. Third, the six quarter-final and semi-final losers from the previous Candidates in 1980 qualified.

== 1982 Interzonals ==
Three Interzonal tournaments were held. The top two finishers in each qualified. Zoltán Ribli won the Las Palmas Interzonal ahead of 61-year-old former world champion Vasily Smyslov. Kasparov, 19 years old, won the Moscow Interzonal by a 1½-point margin ahead of Alexander Beliavsky. The Toluca Interzonal was won jointly by Lajos Portisch and Eugenio Torre.

July 1982 Interzonal, Las Palmas
		Rating	1	2	3	4	5	6	7	8	9	10	11	12	13	14	Total	Tie break
1	Zoltán Ribli (Hungary)	2580	–	1	½	1	½	½	1	½	½	½	½	1	1	½	9	
2	Vasily Smyslov (Soviet Union)	2565	0	–	1	0	½	½	½	½	1	1	1	½	1	1	8½	
3	Mihai Șubă (Romania)	2525	½	0	–	0	½	1	1	1	½	1	1	½	1	0	8	
4	Vladimir Tukmakov (Soviet Union)	2555	0	1	1	–	1	½	½	0	1	½	0	½	½	1	7½	48.00
5	Tigran Petrosian (Soviet Union)	2605	½	½	½	0	–	1	½	½	½	1	½	1	½	½	7½	47.00
6	Jan Timman (Netherlands)	2600	½	½	0	½	0	–	½	1	1	½	0	½	½	1	6½	39.25
7	Bent Larsen (Denmark)	2595	0	½	0	½	½	½	–	0	0	½	1	1	1	1	6½	37.50
8	József Pintér (Hungary)	2550	½	½	0	1	½	0	1	–	0	½	½	½	½	½	6	39.25
9	Jonathan Mestel (England)	2540	½	0	½	0	½	0	1	1	–	0	1	½	0	1	6	36.00
10	Lev Psakhis (Soviet Union)	2615	½	0	0	½	0	½	½	½	1	–	½	½	½	1	6	35.00
11	Lars Karlsson (Sweden)	2505	½	0	0	1	½	1	0	½	0	½	–	½	½	½	5½	35.25
12	Slim Bouaziz (Tunisia)	2360	0	½	½	½	0	½	0	½	½	½	½	–	½	1	5½	32.75
13	Jaime Sunye Neto (Brazil)	2500	0	0	0	½	½	½	0	½	1	½	½	½	–	1	5½	31.25
14	Walter Browne (United States)	2590	½	0	1	0	½	0	0	½	0	0	½	0	0	–	3	

September 1982 Interzonal, Moscow
		Rating	1	2	3	4	5	6	7	8	9	10	11	12	13	14	Total	Tie break
1	Garry Kasparov (Soviet Union)	2675	–	½	½	½	½	½	1	1	1	1	1	1	1	½	10	
2	Alexander Beliavsky (Soviet Union)	2620	½	–	1	½	1	1	0	0	1	1	0	1	½	1	8½	
3	Mikhail Tal (Soviet Union)	2610	½	0	–	½	½	½	1	½	½	1	1	½	1	½	8	48.00
4	Ulf Andersson (Sweden)	2610	½	½	½	–	0	½	1	½	½	½	1	1	½	1	8	47.50
5	Efim Geller (Soviet Union)	2565	½	0	½	1	–	½	½	0	1	1	½	½	1	½	7½	46.50
6	Guillermo Garcia Gonzales (Cuba)	2500	½	0	½	½	½	–	1	1	0	1	1	½	0	1	7½	45.25
7	Jacob Murey (Israel)	2500	0	1	0	0	½	0	–	1	½	½	½	½	1	1	6½	
8	Gyula Sax (Hungary)	2560	0	1	½	½	1	0	0	–	½	½	0	½	½	1	6	37.50
9	Larry Christiansen (United States)	2505	0	0	½	½	0	1	½	½	–	0	½	½	1	1	6	34.25
10	Dragoljub Velimirović (Yugoslavia)	2495	0	0	0	½	0	0	½	½	1	–	½	1	1	½	5½	
11	John van der Wiel (Netherlands)	2520	0	1	0	0	½	0	½	1	½	½	–	½	0	½	5	31.25
12	Florin Gheorghiu (Romania)	2535	0	0	½	0	½	½	½	½	½	0	½	–	1	½	5	29.25
13	Ruben Rodríguez (Philippines)	2415	0	½	0	½	0	1	0	½	0	0	1	0	–	1	4½	
14	Miguel Quinteros (Argentina)	2520	½	0	½	0	½	0	0	0	0	½	½	½	0	–	3	

Tal and Andersson contested a playoff in Malmö for a reserve spot for the Candidates Tournament. The match ended 3–3; Tal became first reserve because of his better tie break score, but no reserves were needed.

1982 Interzonal, Toluca
		Rating	1	2	3	4	5	6	7	8	9	10	11	12	13	14	Total	Tie break
1	Lajos Portisch (Hungary)	2625	–	½	1	½	0	½	0	1	1	1	½	1	1	½	8½	51.75
2	Eugenio Torre (Philippines)	2535	½	–	½	0	½	1	1	½	½	½	1	½	1	1	8½	51.00
3	Boris Spassky (France)	2610	0	½	–	½	½	½	½	½	½	1	1	1	½	1	8	
4	Igor Ivanov (Canada)	2505	½	1	½	–	½	½	½	½	½	½	1	½	0	1	7½	48.00
5	Artur Yusupov (Soviet Union)	2555	1	½	½	½	–	½	½	½	½	0	½	1	½	1	7½	46.00
6	Lev Polugaevsky (Soviet Union)	2610	½	0	½	½	½	–	1	½	½	½	½	½	1	1	7½	44.50
7	Yasser Seirawan (United States)	2595	1	0	½	½	½	0	–	0	1	1	½	½	1	1	7½	44.25
8	John Nunn (England)	2565	0	½	½	½	½	½	1	–	½	½	½	½	½	1	7	
9	Yuri Balashov (Soviet Union)	2555	0	½	½	½	½	½	0	½	–	1	0	1	½	1	6½	38.00
10	András Adorján (Hungary)	2510	0	½	0	½	1	½	0	½	0	–	1	½	1	1	6½	36.75
11	Krunoslav Hulak (Yugoslavia)	2495	½	0	0	0	½	½	½	½	1	0	–	½	½	1	5½	
12	Jorge Rubinetti (Argentina)	2415	0	½	0	½	0	½	½	½	0	½	½	–	½	0	4	27.00
13	Amador Rodríguez Céspedes (Cuba)	2480	0	0	½	1	½	0	0	½	½	0	½	½	–	0	4	26.75
14	Bachar Kouatly (Lebanon)	2440	½	0	0	0	0	0	0	0	0	0	0	1	1	–	2½	

== 1983–1984 Candidates Tournament ==
The six Interzonal qualifiers were joined by Viktor Korchnoi and Robert Hübner, the Candidates finalists from the previous cycle (World Chess Championship 1981). The eight players participated in a series of knockout matches. The winner was Garry Kasparov.

Quarterfinals
Moscow, 1983
(Soviet Union) Garry Kasparov	6
(Soviet Union) Alexander Beliavsky	3
Bad Kissingen, 1983
(Hungary) Lajos Portisch	3
(Switzerland) Viktor Korchnoi	6
Alicante, 1983
(Hungary) Zoltán Ribli	6
(Philippines) Eugenio Torre	4
Velden am Wörther See, Mar–Apr 1983
(West Germany) Robert Hübner	7
(Soviet Union) Vasily Smyslov	7

Semifinals
London, Nov–Dec 1983
(Soviet Union) Garry Kasparov	7
(Switzerland) Viktor Korchnoi	4
London, Nov–Dec 1983
(Hungary) Zoltán Ribli	4½
(Soviet Union) Vasily Smyslov	6½

Final
Vilnius, March–April 1984
(Soviet Union) Garry Kasparov	8½
(Soviet Union) Vasily Smyslov	4½

The Smyslov–Hübner match was tied at 5–5. After playing four extra games without breaking the tie, the match was resolved by a spin of the roulette wheel. The ball went into the zero on the first spin, before deciding in favor of Smyslov.

Politics threatened Kasparov's semi-final match against Viktor Korchnoi, which was scheduled to be played in Pasadena, California. Various political manoeuvres prevented Kasparov from playing Korchnoi in the United States, and Kasparov forfeited the match. This was resolved when Korchnoi agreed for the match to be replayed in London, along with the Vasily Smyslov–Zoltán Ribli match. The Korchnoi–Kasparov match was put together on short notice by Raymond Keene. Kasparov won 7–4.

== 1984–1985 Championship match ==
World Chess Championship Match September 1984 – February 1985: Games 1-24
	Rating	1	2	3	4	5	6	7	8	9	10	11	12	13	14	15	16	17	18	19	20	21	22	23	24
(Soviet Union) Anatoly Karpov	2700	½	½	1	½	½	1	1	½	1	½	½	½	½	½	½	½	½	½	½	½	½	½	½	½
(Soviet Union) Garry Kasparov	2710	½	½	0	½	½	0	0	½	0	½	½	½	½	½	½	½	½	½	½	½	½	½	½	½

World Chess Championship Match September 1984 – February 1985: Games 25–48
	Rating	25	26	27	28	29	30	31	32	33	34	35	36	37	38	39	40	41	42	43	44	45	46	47	48	Wins	Total
(Soviet Union) Anatoly Karpov	2700	½	½	1	½	½	½	½	0	½	½	½	½	½	½	½	½	½	½	½	½	½	½	0	0	5	25
(Soviet Union) Garry Kasparov	2710	½	½	0	½	½	½	½	1	½	½	½	½	½	½	½	½	½	½	½	½	½	½	1	1	3	23

The previous record length for a world title match had been 34 games, the 1927 match between José Capablanca and Alexander Alekhine, which also followed the "first to 6 wins" format.

Out of the first nine games, Karpov won four, and he then won the next decisive game, leading the match 5–0 by game 27. But then he could not win another game (and thus win the match) for twenty games, by which time Kasparov started gaining ground. The long stretch of fourteen draws after game 32 led to a dilemma for the organizers, who were in difficulties to secure a new playing venue for an indefinite period time as the lease on the Hall Of Columns had already expired. On January 31, Kasparov won his second game against Karpov in game 47. As the venue was being changed to the Sport Hotel, game 48 was postponed.

FIDE President Florencio Campomanes called for a meeting with Karpov and Kasparov and suggested that the match be limited to eight more games, and if no result emerged then a new match would be held in September 1985. Kasparov was represented in this meeting by the leader of his delegation Yuri Mamedov, who conveyed that Kasparov wanted to continue the match, but that he would tell Kasparov about Campomanes's proposal. Jury Chairman Alfred Kinzel took on Campomanes's role as negotiator after Campomanes went to Dubai to organize the upcoming Chess Olympiad.

According to FIDE General Secretary Lim Kok Ann, on February 4 Kasparov conveyed to Kinzel that he was willing to end the match only if it was terminated immediately. Kasparov stated that he objected to Campomanes's proposal and said "If the rules are being changed anyway, why then do we need to play these extra games?" Kasparov stated he rejected the proposal as it meant that winning the match would require winning every second game, and that Karpov would be able to play for wins without risk. Kasparov also said that his comment was taken out of context, in order to present him as having been the one to want to end the match. Kok Ann stated that Kinzel then approached Karpov, conveying a new proposal to end the match immediately. Karpov rejected this proposal and said that he would only agree to ending the match immediately if the new match started with a 5–2 score, representing Karpov's current lead in the current match. In game 48 on February 8, Kasparov scored a second consecutive win. Karpov, who hadn't won a game in three months, appeared to be exhausted. On February 11, Kasparov took a time out. On February 13, the USSR Chess Federation sent a message to Campomanes, proposing that the match be paused for three months, citing concerns about the health of the players, and that the match would resume with the current score of 5–3 for Karpov.

The match was ended without result by Campomanes, and a new match at 0–0 was announced to start a few months later. The termination was controversial, as there was no precedent for this type of decision. In a backroom meeting after the press conference, both players stated that they preferred for the match to continue. Kasparov recalls that Karpov did not want to agree to end the match, but was persuaded by Chairman of the USSR Chess Federation Vitaly Sevastyanov, and that Karpov was adamant that he obtains the right to a return match after the scheduled September 1985 match. The Los Angeles Times reported that after the backroom meeting, Kasparov stated that he did not know "if he [Karpov] is sincere in declaring he wants to play on", and likened the situation to a "well-rehearsed show". There was speculation that Campomanes had made the decision due to political pressure from the KGB and the USSR Chess Federation that was widely considered to favor Karpov. Chess historian Edward Winter stated that journalists widely believed Kasparov's claim that Campomanes ended the match to help Karpov, but that in the coming years Kasparov's account had started to be questioned. Announcing his decision at a press conference, Campomanes cited the health of the players, which had been strained by the length of the match (5 months: 10 September 1984 to 8 February 1985).

Karpov later regretted agreeing to cancel the match. He wrote an open letter demanding that the match be restarted and decided to publish it through the Soviet news agency TASS. Campomanes then tried to contact Kasparov. With no response, Campomanes informed the Sports Committee that the match would restart if Kasparov did not object. The leader of Kasparov's delegation Yuri Mamedov then informed match arbiter Gligoric that Kasparov did not wish to restart the match. Mamedov later wrote in 64 magazine that they did not agree to restart the match because they believed that Karpov would have control over the restart of the match. Kasparov believed that Karpov, Campomanes and the Soviet Chess Federation were responsible for terminating the match to prevent Karpov from potentially losing.

Karpov denied Kasparov's claim that he had worked behind the scenes to terminate the match. He stated that Kasparov did not wish for the match to continue as he still needed three wins, while he [Karpov] only needed one win. Karpov believed that Heydar Aliev was responsible for canceling the match. He stated that Aliev was a big supporter of Kasparov, and that he was the main person in charge of sports and culture in the USSR. Karpov regretted that the match took place in the Soviet Union, stating that the organizers disregarded their responsibilities. This match remains the first and only world championship match to be called off without a result.

FIDE General Secretary Lim Kok Ann stated that not intervening in the match may have led to a potential breakdown of the players' health and that Campomanes's decision was not in service of Karpov as Campomanes rejected the proposal of the USSR Chess Federation to pause the match for three months, resuming with a 5–3 score, which would have benefited Karpov. Kok Ann also stated that "no one has given a convincing answer" regarding the practical questions of how long the hotel needed to be booked for the organization team and the players, as well as questions of satisfying player agreement on an inferior venue and relief of the referees.

The restarted match (the World Chess Championship 1985) was best of 24. Kasparov won 13–11.

In 2020, Karpov said that if he had won this match 6–0, Kasparov would never have become world champion, because he was too emotional.

Campomanes's decision to abort the match contributed to Kasparov's decision to break with FIDE and start the Professional Chess Association.

== Notes ==
=== General references ===
- Kasparov, Garry (2008), Modern Chess: Part 2, Kasparov vs Karpov 1975–1985, Everyman Chess, ISBN 978-1-85744-433-9
- Soltis, Andy (September 2010), "Woulda-Coulda-Shoulda, or Black to Play 37. ...Rd5 and Change History", Chess Life: 12–13
- Speelman, Jon; Tisdall, Jonathan (1985), Moscow marathon: the World Chess Championship, Unwin Paperbacks, ISBN 0-04-794022-0
