= My Great Predecessors =

Series of chess books

My Great Predecessors is a series of chess books written by former World Champion Garry Kasparov et al. The five volumes in the My Great Predecessors series are about the players who preceded Kasparov in being official World Champions. The series of books continued with the Modern Chess volumes that covers developments in the 1970s and Kasparov's games with Anatoly Karpov. The series is being extended with three volumes of Garry Kasparov on Garry Kasparov, covering his other games. The books contain historical details, but for the most part the books are made up of annotated games.

Chess journalist Dmitry Plisetsky helped with the books and Kasparov thanks some other chess players in the prefaces of each of the volumes. The books were translated into English by Ken Neat.

== My Great Predecessors ==
My Great Predecessors, part I

My Great Predecessors comprises five volumes:

- Part I starts with a chapter about some of the unofficial world champions (before 1886), though much of the commentary focuses on Adolf Anderssen and Paul Morphy. It then covers the first four official world champions: Wilhelm Steinitz, Emanuel Lasker, José Raúl Capablanca, and Alexander Alekhine.
- Part II covers the fifth through eighth world champions: Max Euwe, Mikhail Botvinnik, Vasily Smyslov, and Mikhail Tal. Euwe briefly interrupted the reign of Alekhine, while Smyslov's and Tal's respective interruptions to Botvinnik's long reign were similarly brief.
- Part III covers the ninth and tenth champions, Tigran Petrosian and Boris Spassky. Petrosian ended Botvinnik's reign in 1963. Spassky challenged Petrosian unsuccessfully in 1966, but defeated him in their 1969 rematch.
- Part IV starts by covering some strong Western players who were not world champions: Samuel Reshevsky, Miguel Najdorf, and Bent Larsen. The primary focus of this volume is the eleventh World Champion Bobby Fischer.
- Part V covers World Championship contender Victor Korchnoi and the twelfth World Champion Anatoly Karpov. Korchnoi and Karpov played three matches in the World Championship, in 1974, 1978, and 1981. The first match was in the Candidates Tournament to determine who would challenge Fischer in 1975. Fischer refused to defend his title, making the 1974 Karpov versus Korchnoi match a de facto World Championship match.

== Modern Chess ==
Modern Chess, part One

The Modern Chess series covers chess opening developments in the 1970s, all of Kasparov's five World Championship matches with Karpov, and his other games with Karpov.

- Part One covers the revolution in chess openings of the 1970s in the wake of Fischer. The book covers new ideas in the Hedgehog system, several lines of the Sicilian Defense, the Grünfeld Defense, the Caro–Kann Defense, the Ruy Lopez, the French Defense, the Nimzo-Indian Defense, and others. Complete games are used to illustrate these opening ideas. The book ends with the opinions of 28 experts.
- Part Two covers all of the games between Karpov and Kasparov himself through 1985, including their aborted match in 1984 and their 1985 match in which Kasparov became the thirteenth World Champion. Four early games between the two players are included as well as all 48 games of their first match and all 24 games of their second match.
- Part Three covers the 1986 match and the 1987 match between Karpov and Kasparov. It includes all 24 games of the 1986 match, all 24 games of the 1987 match, and three games played between the two matches (two were blitz games).
- Part Four includes the 24 games of the 1990 match against Karpov and 42 of their other games through 2009.

== Garry Kasparov on Garry Kasparov ==
- Part I: 1973–1985 This volume covers 100 games starting from his early days. It ends with a few of the games from his 1984 match with Karpov (the endings only).
- Part II: 1985–1993 This volume covers the period of being the FIDE World Champion. It includes 100 games from matches and tournaments.
- Part III: 1993–2005 Covers the period after being FIDE World Champion.

== Reception ==
My Great Predecessors received lavish praise from some reviewers (including Nigel Short), while attracting criticism from others for historical inaccuracies and analysis of games directly copied from unattributed sources. Reviewing My Great Predecessors Part I, chess historian Edward Winter said, "The absence of, even, a basic bibliography is shocking in a work which claims to be 'Garry Kasparov's long-awaited definitive history of the World Chess Championship', and a lackadaisical attitude to basic academic standards and historical facts pervades the book."

International Master John L. Watson said that Predecessors "must be recommended as an ambitious, interesting work by (I believe) the greatest player in history. It clearly delights and inspires some of its readership regardless of its weaknesses, and is a book that most players will want to own, if only for the story-like narration of events and chess developments. For these reasons alone, I would call it a significant book, perhaps even one of this year's best. But for some reason we have been led to believe that Predecessors is a masterpiece, belonging to the class of great books if not transcending them. In reality it is something less grandiose: a valuable book with numerous weak spots."

Reviewing My Great Predecessors Part I, International Master William John Donaldson said the book "represents good value if one lowers one's expectations and views it as a very reasonably priced hardback game collection rather than the definitive historical guide to the early World Champions. It is too bad that Kasparov and Plisetsky didn't hire Winter to fact check the book. It could have been much better and one hopes more care is taken with upcoming volumes."

Through suggestions on the book's website, some of the book's criticisms were addressed in following editions and translations. The books have received several awards from the English Chess Federation, which said: "... Kasparov’s mammoth series has set new standards for writing about chess history."

=== English Chess Federation Book of the Year Awards ===
- 2003: My Great Predecessors, Part I – best book
- 2004: My Great Predecessors, Part II – runner-up for best book
- 2005: My Great Predecessors, Part IV – best book
- 2006: My Great Predecessors, Part V – short list of the best books
- 2007: Modern Chess, Part One – short list of the best books

== Book data ==
- Kasparov, Garry (2003). My Great Predecessors, Part I. Everyman Chess. p. 454. ISBN 978-1-85744-330-1.
- Kasparov, Garry (2003). My Great Predecessors, Part II. Everyman Chess. p. 480. ISBN 978-1-85744-342-4.
- Kasparov, Garry (2004). My Great Predecessors, Part III. Everyman Chess. p. 332. ISBN 978-1-85744-371-4.
- Kasparov, Garry (2004). My Great Predecessors, Part IV: Fischer. Everyman Chess. p. 496. ISBN 978-1-85744-395-0.
- Kasparov, Garry (2006). My Great Predecessors, Part V. Everyman Chess. p. 480. ISBN 978-1-85744-404-9.
- Kasparov, Garry (2007). Modern Chess, Part One: Revolution in the 70s. Everyman Chess. p. 416. ISBN 978-1-85744-422-3.
- Kasparov, Garry (2008). Modern Chess, Part Two: Kasparov vs Karpov 1975–1985. Everyman Chess. p. 424. ISBN 978-1-85744-433-9.
- Kasparov, Garry (2009). Modern Chess, Part Three: Kasparov vs Karpov 1986–1987. Everyman Chess. p. 432. ISBN 978-1-85744-625-8.
- Kasparov, Garry (2010). Modern Chess, Part Four: Kasparov vs Karpov 1988–2009. Everyman Chess. p. 432. ISBN 978-1-85744-652-4.
- Kasparov, Garry (2011). Garry Kasparov on Garry Kasparov, Part 1: 1973–1985. Everyman Chess. p. 520. ISBN 978-1-85744-672-2.
- Kasparov, Garry (2013). Garry Kasparov on Garry Kasparov, Part II: 1985–1993. Everyman Chess. p. 495. ISBN 978-1-78194-024-2.
- Kasparov, Garry (2015). Garry Kasparov on Garry Kasparov, Part III: 1993–2005. Everyman Chess. p. 500. ISBN 978-1-78194-183-6.

== See also ==
- List of chess books
- List of books and documentaries by or about Bobby Fischer, including Garry Kasparov on Fischer: Garry Kasparov On My Great Predecessors, Part 4. Everyman Chess. ISBN 978-1857443950.
