= Luis Marcos Bronstein =

Argentine chess player

Personal information
- Born: 2 June 1946 Córdoba, Argentina
- Died: 8 January 2014 (aged 67) Buenos Aires, Argentina

Chess career
- Country: Argentina
- Title: International Master (1978)
- Peak rating: 2425 (January 1985)

Luis Marcos Bronstein (2 June 1946 – 8 January 2014), was an Argentine chess player, International Master (1978), Chess Olympiad individual bronze medal winner (1976).

== Biography ==
In the 1970s and 1980s Luis Marcos Bronstein was one of the leading Argentine chess players. From 1966 to 2003, he regularly participated in the Argentine Chess Championships, which he achieved best result in 1982, when he shared 1st - 5th places but remained in 4th place in the additional tournament.

In 1979 in Rio de Janeiro Luis Marcos Bronstein participated in the World Chess Championship Interzonal Tournament where ranked in 16th place.

Luis Marcos Bronstein played for Argentina in the Chess Olympiads:

- In 1976, at second reserve board in the 22nd Chess Olympiad in Haifa (+4, =2, -1) and won individual bronze medal,
- In 1978, at second board in the 23rd Chess Olympiad in Buenos Aires (+3, =3, -3),
- In 1982, at first reserve board in the 25th Chess Olympiad in Lucerne (+4, =2, -3).

In 1978, he was awarded the FIDE International Master (IM) title.
