= Slim Bouaziz =

Tunisian chess grandmaster (born 1950)

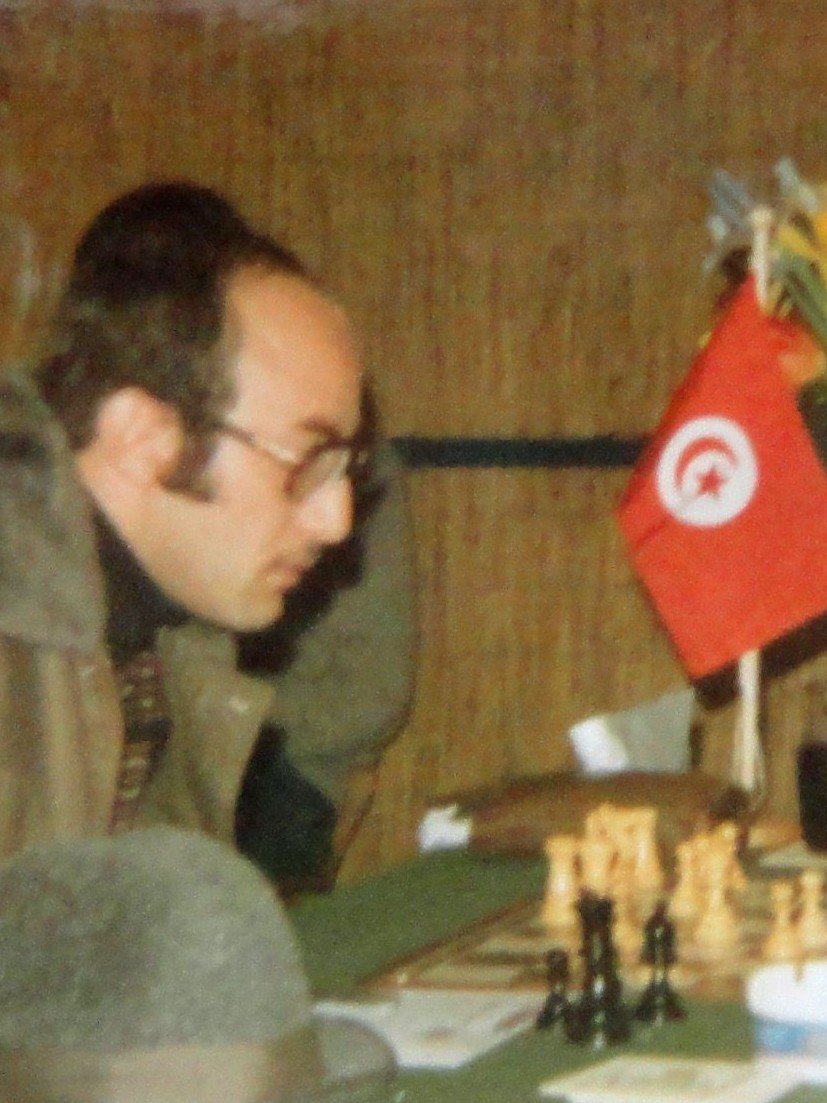
- Slim Bouaziz in 1979

Personal information
- Born: 16 April 1950 (age 76) Tunis, Tunisia

Chess career
- Country: Tunisia
- Title: Grandmaster (1993)
- Peak rating: 2315 (July 1993)

Slim Bouaziz (Arabic: سليم بوعزيز; born 16 April 1950) is a Tunisian chess Grandmaster (1993).

== Chess career ==
From the late 1960s to the early 2000s, Slim Bouaziz was the leading African chess player. He twice won the Arab Chess Championships (1986, 1991).

Slim Bouaziz is the only African chess to player to participate in 5 Interzonal Tournaments of the World Chess Championships:

- In 1967 in Sousse ranked 22nd place;
- In 1979 in Riga ranked 15th place;
- In 1982 in Las Palmas ranked 12th place;
- In 1985 in Tunis withdrew after six rounds, having drawn only one game and lost the rest;
- In 1987 in Szirak ranked 17th place.

In 1999, in Las Vegas Strip he participated in FIDE World Chess Championship 1999, where in the first round he lost to Vasilios Kotronias.

Slim Bouaziz was a participant in many international chess tournaments where he won or shared first place in Belgrade (1977) and Bucharest (1992).

Slim Bouaziz represented the Tunisian team in major team chess tournaments:

- in Chess Olympiad participated 16 times (1966-1970, 1974, 1978–1986, 1990–1996, 2000, 2004–2006);
- in World Team Chess Championship participated in 1989;
- in World Student Chess Championship participated 3 times (1963, 1965–1966).

Bouaziz was awarded the FIDE International Master (IM) title in 1975 and became a Grandmaster (GM) in 1993. He was the first African chess player to receive the Grandmaster title. In 2014, Bouaziz also became an FIDE International Organizer.
