= Mária Grosch =

Hungarian chess player (born 1954)

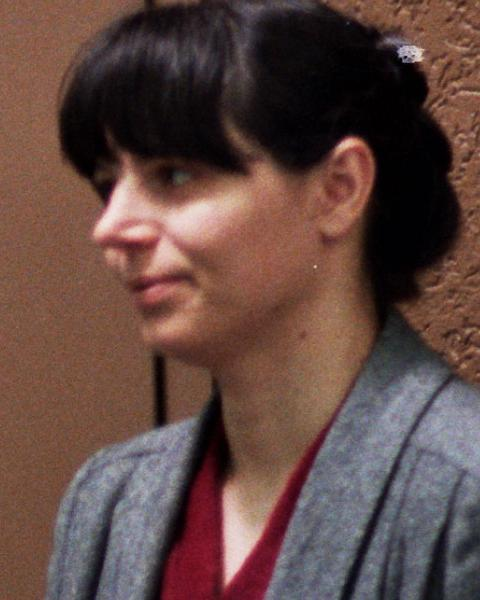
- Grosch in 1982

Personal information
- Born: 3 August 1954 (age 71)
- Spouse: Zoltán Ribli

Chess career
- Country: Hungary
- Title: Woman International Master (1984)
- Peak rating: 2220 (January 1987)

Mária Grosch (born 3 August 1954) is a Hungarian chess player who holds the FIDE title of Woman International Master (WIM, 1984).

== Biography ==
From the late 1970s to the middle of the 1980s, Grosch was one of Hungary's leading women chess players. She won the three bronze medals in the Hungarian Women's Chess Championships (1978, 1979, 1981). In 1986, she shared the first place in the Hungarian Women's Chess Championship, but lost Mária Ivánka an additional match for the title. In 1982, Grosch shared the 3rd place in the International Women's Chess tournament in Dortmund, but in 1985 she took fourth place in the Budapest International Women's Chess tournament. In 1984, Mária Grosch was awarded the FIDE Woman International Master (WIM) title. In 1987, she participated in the World Chess Women's Championship Zonal tournament.

Grosch played for Hungary in the Women's Chess Olympiads:

- In 1986, at first reserve board in the 27th Chess Olympiad (women) in Dubai (+2, =1, -2) and won the team a silver medal.

In 1989, she finished her professional chess player career. Grosch is married to grandmaster Zoltán Ribli.
