= Lajos Portisch =

Hungarian chess grandmaster (born 1937)

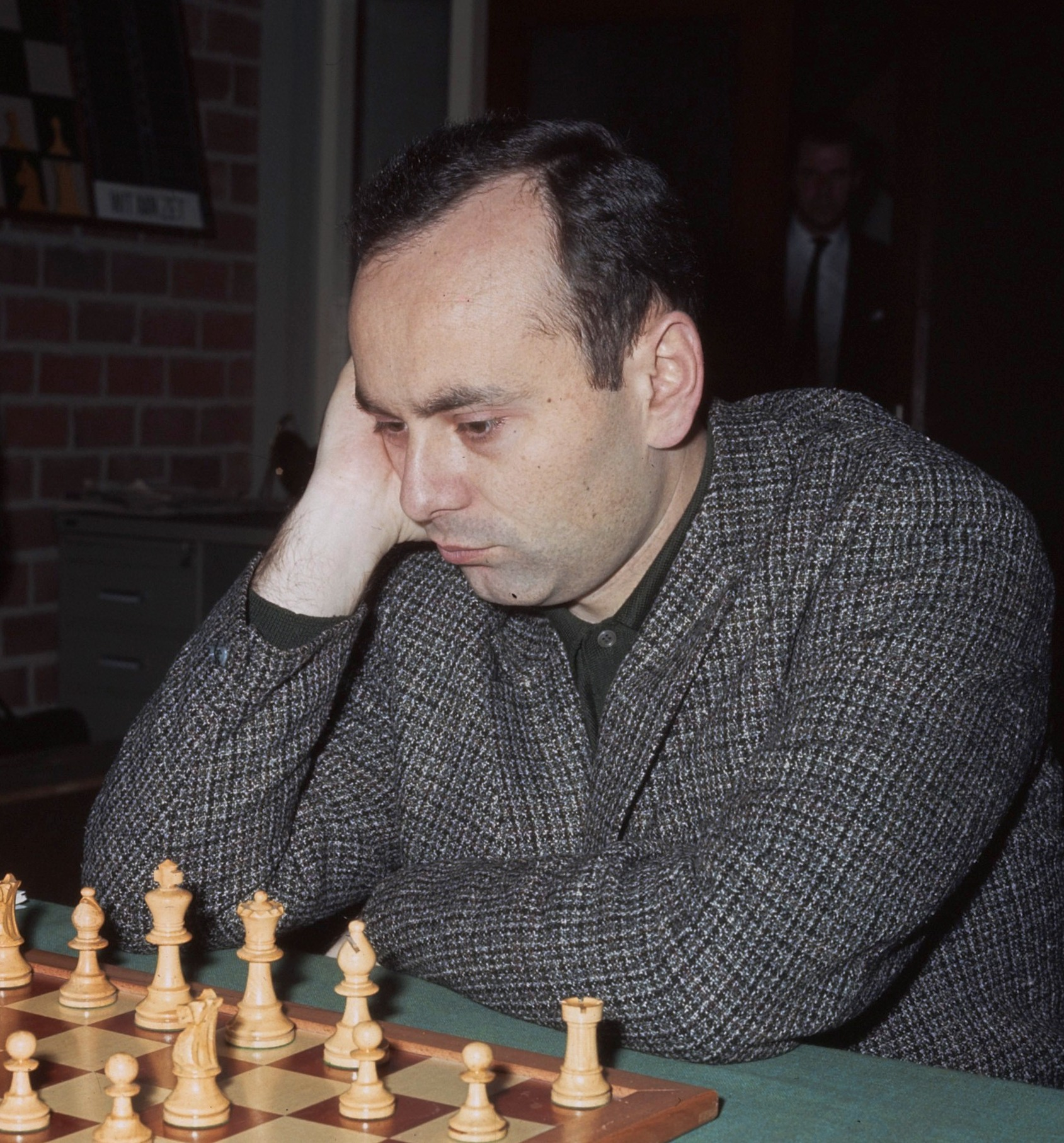
- Portisch in 1968

Personal information
- Born: 4 April 1937 (age 89) Zalaegerszeg, Kingdom of Hungary

Chess career
- Country: Hungary
- Title: Grandmaster (1961)
- FIDE rating: 2467 (September 2026)
- Peak rating: 2655 (January 1980)
- Peak ranking: No. 2 (January 1981)

Lajos Portisch (born 4 April 1937) is a Hungarian chess grandmaster, whose positional style earned him the nickname "the Hungarian Botvinnik". One of the world's strongest players from the early 1960s into the late 1980s, he participated in twelve consecutive Interzonals from 1962 through 1993, qualifying for the World Chess Championship Candidates Cycle a total of eight times (1965, 1968, 1974, 1977, 1980, 1983, 1985, and 1988). Portisch set several all-time records in Chess Olympiads. In Hungarian Chess Championships, he either shared the title or won it outright a total of nine times (1957, 1958, 1959, 1961, 1964, 1965, 1971, 1975, and 1981). He won many strong international tournaments during his career. In 2004, Portisch was awarded the title of 'Nemzet Sportolója' (Sportsman of the Nation), Hungary's highest national sports achievement award.

His main hobby is singing operatic arias; he has a fine baritone voice, a quality shared by Vasily Smyslov, a chess world champion and grandmaster who also had talent as an operatic singer. His younger brother, Ferenc (born 1939), is an International Master.

== Early years ==
Portisch represented Hungary at the World Junior Chess Championship, Antwerp 1955. He scored 4½/7 in the preliminary round to advance to the final, where he scored 5½/9, to finish fourth; the winner was Boris Spassky. Portisch tied for first through third places in a master event at Budapest 1956, along with József Szily and Béla Sándor, ahead of Pal Benko; the three winners scored 7/11. In a second master event at Budapest 1956, Portisch made 7½/11. He was in the pack at Debrecen 1956 with 5½/11.

Portisch successfully represented Hungary in several team matches in 1956 and 1957, against Poland, Estonia, the Soviet Union, Belarus, and Yugoslavia. He made his first Student Olympiad and full Olympiad appearances for Hungary in 1956; he would eventually represent Hungary at a record twenty Olympiads (see below). He excelled at his first individual international event, winning at Balatonfüred 1958 with 9/11, ahead of strong Grandmasters László Szabó and Alexander Tolush. He earned the International Master title. He finished second at Hastings 1958–59 with 7/9, behind Wolfgang Uhlmann.

== Nine-time Hungarian Champion ==
Portisch made his first national top-level appearance in 1955 at the age of 18, at the Hungarian Chess Championship. He would eventually win or share the national title on nine occasions. His complete Hungarian Championship results follow (from chessmetrics.com).

- 1955: 9½/19, shared tenth/eleventh places (champion Gedeon Barcza);
- 1957: 7½/13, shared fifth/six places (champion Barcza);
- 1958: shared first/third places with Barcza and László Szabó, won playoff;
- 1959: shared first/third places with Barcza and L Szabó, third after playoff (champion Szabó);
- 1961: shared first/second places with L Szabó, won playoff;
- 1962: 16½/22, champion;
- 1963: 13/19, fourth place (champion István Bilek);
- 1964: 14½/19, champion;
- 1965: 15½/21, champion;
- 1968: 14½/21, second place (champion Gyozo Forintos);
- 1971: 11/16, champion;
- 1975: 12½/17, champion;
- 1981: 5½/9, champion, shared first/second places with Iván Faragó;
- 1984: 6/10, shared second/fourth places (champion Andras Adorjan);
- 1991: 4½/9, sixth place (champion Judit Polgár);
- 2003: 5½/9, shared second/third places (champion Zoltán Almási).

== World Title Candidate ==
In the World Chess Championship cycles, Portisch played in every Interzonal from 1962 to 1993, twelve in total. He qualified for the next stage, the Candidates Tournament, eight times: in the 1966, 1969, 1975, 1978, 1981, 1984, 1987 and 1990 cycles; with his best results when he reached the Candidates semi-finals in 1977 and 1980.

Portisch entered the World Championship cycle for the first time with the Madrid 1960 Zonal, where he tied for second/third place, on 13½/21, along with Arturo Pomar; the winner was Svetozar Gligorić, as all three advanced. Portisch was awarded the grandmaster title by FIDE in 1961.

Portisch's first Interzonal appearance was the 1962 Interzonal in Stockholm, where he tied for ninth/tenth places, after losing a late-round game to one of the tail-enders, and did not advance to the Candidates Tournament.

Portisch won the Halle Zonal 1963 with 14/19 to advance to the next Interzonal. At the 1964 Interzonal in Amsterdam he finished in a tie for eighth/ninth, with 14½/23. Only six players qualified for the Candidates, but due to a rule limiting the number of players from a single country, the Soviet Union players Leonid Stein and David Bronstein were ineligible, so Portisch played a match against Samuel Reshevsky to determine who would be the sixth qualifier. Portisch won the match to the Candidates' series for the first time, but he lost his first round match against Mikhail Tal, by 2½–5½.

Portisch won the 1967 Halle Zonal with 15½/19, to advance. He qualified through the Sousse Interzonal 1967, with 13½/21 for a solo fifth-place finish. The winner was Bent Larsen. Portisch then lost his first-round Candidates' match to Larsen at Poreč 1968, by 4½–5½.

He qualified from the Raach 1969 Zonal, after tying for second/fifth places, on 13½/21, then winning a four-way playoff for two berths at Prague 1970 with 4/6, against Borislav Ivkov, Jan Smejkal, and Ulf Andersson. He advanced, but narrowly missed Candidates' qualification at the Palma de Mallorca Interzonal 1970, tying with Vasily Smyslov for seventh/eighth places on 13½/23, after another late defeat at the hands of one of the outsiders; the winner was Fischer. Portisch and Smyslov played a drawn match (3–3) at Portorož 1971 for a reserve place, with Portisch declared the winner, as his tiebreak score from Palma was superior, though this proved unnecessary.

Portisch qualified from the Petropolis Interzonal 1973, scoring 11½/17 for a shared second/fourth place (the winner was Henrique Mecking), then surviving a further three-man playoff for two berths against Lev Polugaevsky and Efim Geller, at Portorož 1973, by winning outright with 5½/8; however, Portisch lost his first-round Candidates' match to Tigran Petrosian in 1974, by 6–7 at Palma de Mallorca.

At the 1976 Biel Interzonal, he tied for second/fourth places on 12/19 with Petrosian and Tal, after Larsen. Then, in a three-way playoff for two spots, held at Varese 1976, Portisch scored 4/8 for second place, with Tal being eliminated. In the Candidates' matches, he first advanced to the semifinals after beating Bent Larsen by 6½–3½ at Rotterdam 1977, then lost to Boris Spassky by 6½–8½ at Geneva 1977.

In 1979 he advanced from the Rio de Janeiro Interzonal, sharing first/third places, on 11½/17, along with Petrosian and Robert Hübner. Portisch got his revenge against Spassky in 1980, when he tied their quarterfinal match 7–7 in Mexico, and advanced to the semifinals since he had more victories with the black pieces. He then lost the semi-final to Hübner by 4½–6½ at Abano Terme 1980.

Qualifying from the Toluca Interzonal 1982, where he tied for first/second places on 8½/13 along with Eugenio Torre, he lost his first-round match to Viktor Korchnoi by 3–6 at Bad Kissingen 1983.

Qualifying from the Tunis Interzonal 1985, where he scored 10/16, he made 7/15 at the Montpellier Candidates' tournament, and was eliminated.

At the 1987 Szirak Interzonal, Portisch scored 12/17 to tie for third/fourth places, along with John Nunn; he then defeated Nunn by 4–2 in a playoff match at Budapest to advance to the Candidates'. He won his first-round match at Saint John, New Brunswick 1988 by 3½–2½ over Rafael Vaganian; he then lost to Jan Timman by 2½–3½ at Antwerp 1989.

At the 1990 Manila Interzonal, he scored +3−5=5, after beginning with +3=2.

In his final appearance in the world championship series, Portisch played well at the 1993 Biel Interzonal, scoring 7½/13 and outperforming his ranking significantly, but did not advance.

Portisch was Karpov's second in his last world championship match against Kasparov in 1990. In Hungary, Bobby Fischer was telling Portisch that all the games between Karpov and Kasparov were rigged, so Portisch asked, in that case, "What was I doing there?"

== Tournament successes ==
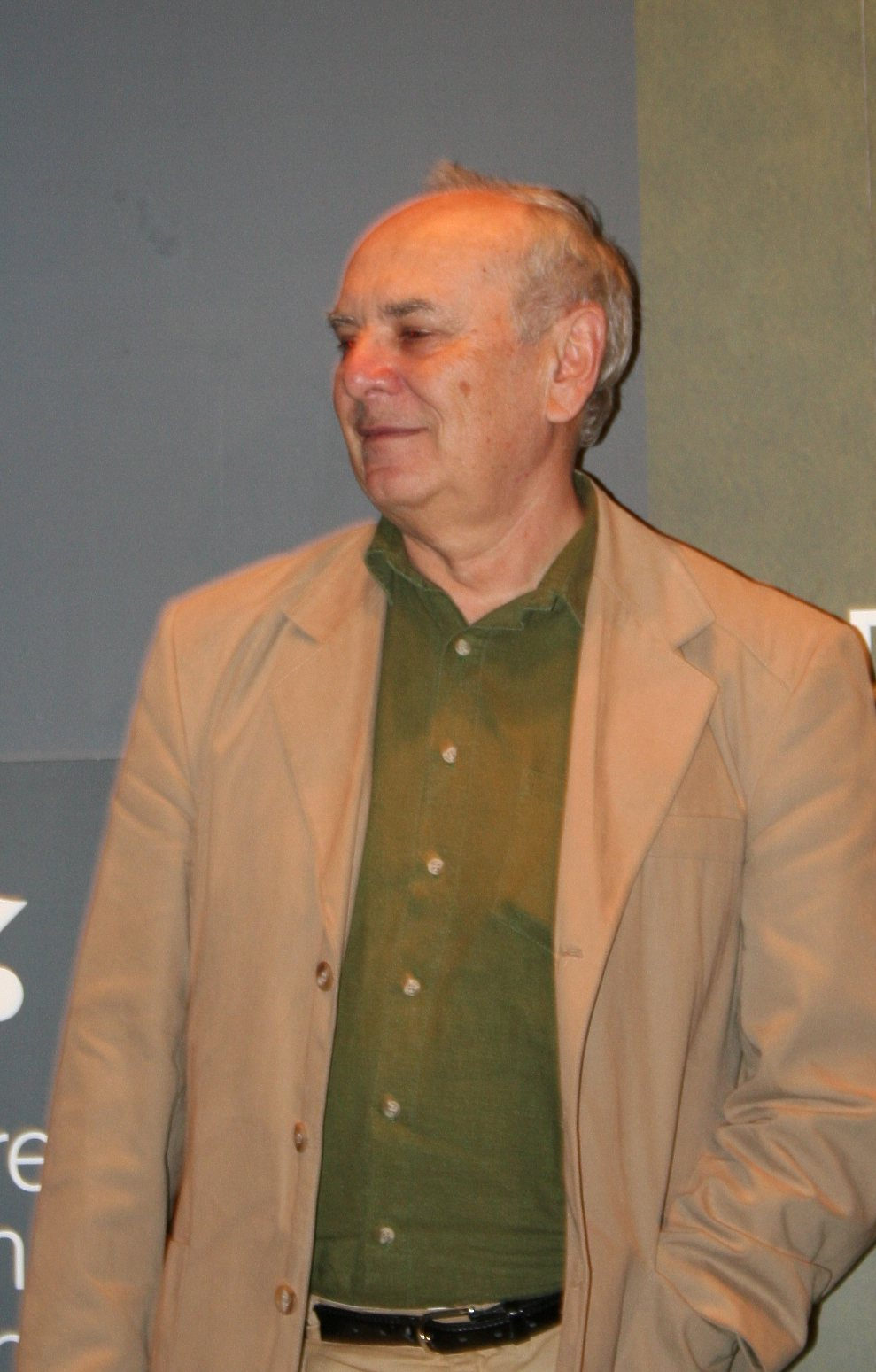
Portisch in 2005

Portisch was very active on the international tournament scene from the late 1950s through the early 1990s, and was one of the top performers for over thirty years, with many titles against elite fields. He often finished ahead of the top Soviet Grandmasters at important events, was usually near the top of the table, and only rarely finished with minus scores, showing remarkable consistency. Portisch won at least one major international event per year for nearly two decades.

His first top-class round-robin event was Moscow 1959, where he was the youngest contestant, and scored 6/11 for a shared fourth/sixth place; the winners were Spassky, Smyslov, and David Bronstein. At Balatonfüred 1959, he shared third/fifth with 7½/13; the winner was Ratmir Kholmov. Portisch stepped up his activity in 1961. At Budapest 1961, he scored 9/15 for a shared fourth/seventh place; the winner was Korchnoi. At Moscow 1961, he made 6/11 for a shared fifth/seventh place; the winners were Smyslov and Evgeni Vasiukov. Two disappointing results followed, but he was gathering top-class experience, which would come in useful. At Torremolinos 1961, he made only 5/11 for eighth place; the winners were Gligoric and Arturo Pomar. Then at Bled 1961, with six of the world's top eleven players in the field, Portisch scored 8/19 for a shared fifteenth/sixteenth place; Tal won.

Beginning in 1962, Portisch became a consistent tournament winner at the international level. He shared the title at Sarajevo 1962 with Svetozar Gligorić on 8/11. He shared second/third places at Kecskemét 1962 on 10½/15 behind Ratmir Kholmov. Portisch won Amsterdam IBM 1963 with 6/9 ahead of Jan Hein Donner. He won Sarajevo 1963 with 7/11, ahead of Gligoric, Vladimir Simagin, Wolfgang Uhlmann, and Borislav Ivkov. At Havana 1964, he scored 14/21 for fifth place as Uhlmann and Smyslov won. At Beverwijk 1964, he was third with 11/15 behind Paul Keres and Iivo Nei. He shared second/third at Málaga 1964 on 7½/11 behind Arturo Pomar. He shared the title at Beverwijk 1965 on 10½/15 with Geller. At Yerevan 1965, he was fifth with 7/13 as Korchnoi won. With six of the world's top 25 in the field at Zagreb 1965, Portisch scored 12/19 for a shared third/fourth place, as Ivkov and Uhlmann won. He was third at Mar del Plata 1966 on 9½/15, with Smyslov winning. Portisch shared the title at Kecskemét 1966 on 6½/9, along with Vlastimil Hort. At Santa Monica 1966, with seven of the world's top 16 players in the field, he shared fourth/fifth places on 9½/18, as Spassky won, ahead of Fischer. Portisch was third at Palma de Mallorca 1966 on 10/15, with Tal winning.

Portisch won Amsterdam IBM 1967 with 8/11 ahead of Alexander Kotov. At Moscow 1967, which had 12 of the world's top 33 players, he shared sixth/eighth places with 9½/17, and defeated World Champion Petrosian; the tournament winner was Leonid Stein. Portisch placed fourth at Palma de Mallorca 1967, where seven of the top 30 played, with 11½/17; Larsen won. At Wijk aan Zee 1968, he shared second/fourth places with 9/15 as Korchnoi won. Portisch shared sixth/eighth places at Monte Carlo 1968, which had five of the top 16 players; Larsen won. One of Portisch's career highlights was his clear first place at Skopje/Ohrid 1968, ahead of Geller, Lev Polugaevsky, and Hort, with 14/19.

The year 1969 was his most successful to date. He won Amsterdam IBM 1969 by 1½ points with 11½/15. At Wijk aan Zee 1969, he shared third/fourth places on 10/15, behind winners Mikhail Botvinnik and Efim Geller. Portisch shared first/second places at Monte Carlo 1969 with Vasily Smyslov on 8/11. Then he took clear first at Hastings 1969–70 with 7/9, ahead of Wolfgang Uhlmann, Vasily Smyslov, and Svetozar Gligorić. At Budapest 1970, he shared fifth/sixth places on 8/15, with Paul Keres winning. Portisch played board three at Belgrade 1970 in the USSR vs Rest of the World match, defeating Viktor Korchnoi by 2½–1½. Portisch won at Hastings 1970–71 with 6/9, ahead of Vlastimil Hort, Gligorić, and Uhlmann. At Amsterdam IBM 1971, he shared second/fourth places on 9/15 behind Vasily Smyslov.

By 1972, Portisch was a major contender to win any tournament he entered. He won Wijk aan Zee 1972, which had six of the top 25 players, with 10½/15, ahead of Arturo Pomar, Walter Browne, Vlastimil Hort, and Vasily Smyslov. Portisch won Las Palmas 1972 with 12/15, ahead of Bent Larsen, Vasily Smyslov, and David Bronstein. At Teesside 1972, he finished third with 9½/15, as Bent Larsen won. Portisch shared first/third places at San Antonio 1972 (with eight of the top 25), on 10½/15, with Anatoly Karpov and Tigran Petrosian. Portisch shared third/fourth places at Palma de Mallorca 1972 on 10/15, with Oscar Panno and Ljubomir Ljubojević winning. He won at Ljubljana/Portorož 1973 (Vidmar Memorial) with 12½/17. At Madrid 1973, Portisch shared sixth/seventh places on 9/15, with Karpov winning. He won at Wijk aan Zee 1975 (ahead of Vlastimil Hort and Jan Smejkal). He won the second Interpolis Tournament in the Netherlands in 1978, ahead of Timman. He tied with Borislav Ivkov for first/second at the Tigran Petrosian Memorial, Moscow 1999.

== Team chess results ==
Portisch represented Hungary four times at Student Olympiads, steadily improving his results, and winning three medals. His totals are: (+19−8=11), his detailed record follows:

- Uppsala 1956: board 2, 3/6 (+2−2=2), team silver;
- Reykjavík 1957: board 2, 6/11 (+5−4=2), Hungary fourth;
- Varna 1958: board 1, 5/9 (+3−2=4), Hungary fifth;
- Budapest 1959: board 1, 10½/12 (+9−0=3), board gold, team bronze.

He also led the Hungarian chess team to the gold medal in the 23rd Chess Olympiad held in Buenos Aires in 1978 with a personal score of 10/14. This was the only Olympiad not to be won by the Soviet Union between 1952 and 1990 (except in 1976 when Soviet Union boycotted the competition). He participated in a record 20 Olympiads from 1956 until 2000, playing a record 260 games, over a record six decades, and won 11 medals. His total Olympiad score is: (+121−26=113), for 68.3 per cent. His detailed Olympiad data follows:

- Moscow 1956: second reserve, 6/8 (+4−0=4), team bronze;
- Munich 1958: board 3, 10½/15 (+7−1=7);
- Leipzig 1960: board 2, 11/17 (+7−2=8);
- Varna 1962: board 1, 9½/16 (+6−3=7);
- Tel Aviv 1964: board 1, 12/16 (+9−1=6), board bronze;
- Havana 1966: board 1, 11½/16 (+8−1=7), team bronze;
- Lugano 1968: board 1, 11/15 (+8−1=6);
- Siegen 1970: board 1, 11/16 (+7−1=8), team silver;
- Skopje 1972: board 1, 12/17 (+8−1=8), team silver;
- Nice 1974: board 1, 10/16 (+6−2=8);
- Buenos Aires 1978: board 1, 10/14 (+8−2=4), team gold;
- Valletta 1980: board 1, 9½/13 (+6−0=7), team silver;
- Lucerne 1982: board 1, 7½/12 (+6−3=3);
- Thessaloniki 1984: board 1, 7½/12 (+5−2=5);
- Dubai 1986: board 1, 6/10 (+4−2=4);
- Thessaloniki 1988, board 1, 8½/11 (+6−0=5), board silver, rating bronze;
- Manila 1992, board 2, 4½/9 (+3−3=3);
- Moscow 1994, board 2, 7/9 (+5−0=4), board silver, rating bronze;
- Yerevan 1996, board 2, 5½/9 (+4−2=3);
- Istanbul 2000, board 4, 6/9 (+4−1=4).

Portisch has also represented Hungary at eight European Team Championships, winning a total of 13 medals (7 team and 6 board medals). This makes him the second most decorated player in the history of European Championship, right behind Tigran Petrosian (15 team and board medals). He is also second of all time when it comes to team medals only (behind Petrosian – 8) and board medals only (tied with Geller, behind Petrosian again – 7). He has scored (+16−4=39). His detailed European teams data follows:

- Oberhausen 1961: board 2, 6½/10 (+4−1=5), board gold, team bronze;
- Hamburg 1965: board 1, 5/9 (+1−0=8), team bronze;
- Kapfenberg 1970: board 1, 4/7 (+1−0=6), board bronze, team silver;
- Bath, Somerset 1973: board 1, 3½/5 (+2−0=3), board bronze, team bronze;
- Moscow 1977: board 1, 4½/7 (+3−1=3), board silver, team silver;
- Skara 1980: board 1, 3½/6 (+1−0=5), board bronze, team silver;
- Plovdiv 1983: board 1, 4½/7 (+3−1=3), board gold, team bronze;
- Debrecen 1992: board 1, 4/8 (+1−1=6).

Portisch played board one for Hungary at the inaugural World Team Championship, Lucerne 1985. He scored 5½/9 (+2−0=7), as Hungary won the team silver medals.

== Personal life ==
Portisch is a devout Catholic.

== Notable games ==
- Portisch vs. László Szabó, Budapest 1958, Grunfeld Defence, Exchange Variation (D85), 1–0 The experienced Szabó, 20 years older, tries the unusual knight retreat to b6, perhaps hoping to confuse young Portisch, but it backfires.
- Portisch vs. Svetozar Gligorić, Madrid Zonal 1960, King's Indian Defence, Orthodox Variation (E99), 1–0 In a very heavily analyzed line, one of the veteran Gligoric's favourites, Portisch proves he has the knowledge to prevail.
- Portisch vs. Leonid Stein, Amsterdam Interzonal 1964, Benoni Defence (A56), 1–0 In what would turn out to be a vital game for eventual qualification, Portisch takes out the Soviet champion.
- Portisch vs. Tigran Petrosian, Moscow 1967, Slav Defence, Exchange Variation (D10), 1–0 Although not really considered a tactician, Portisch proves here in a quiet opening variation that not even the World Champion can be proof against his attacking skills.
- Bent Larsen vs. Portisch, Porec Candidates' match 1968, game 4, Queen's Gambit Declined, Orthodox Variation (D61), 0–1 Portisch takes up the often thankless defensive task, but grinds out a hard-fought win.
- Portisch vs. David Bronstein, Monte Carlo 1969, Queen's Gambit, Symmetrical Defence (D06), 1–0 Inventive Bronstein pushes the boundaries too far in this game, and pays the price.
- Vasily Smyslov vs. Portisch, Portorož Candidates' Reserve match 1971, game 4, Sicilian Defence, Najdorf Variation (B92), 0–1 Ex-world champion Smyslov did not lose very often with the White pieces, but Portisch turns the trick here.
- Portisch vs. Anatoly Karpov, San Antonio 1972, Nimzo-Indian Defence, Rubinstein / Gligoric Variation (E55), 1–0 Karpov would ascend to the World Champion's throne less than three years later.
- Mikhail Tal vs. Portisch, Varese Candidates' Playoff 1976, Sicilian Defence, Najdorf Variation, Poisoned Pawn (B97), 0–1 Portisch had lost his match to Tal 11 years earlier, but gets his revenge here.
- Boris Spassky vs. Portisch, Mexico Candidates' match 1980, game 1, Sicilian Defence, Closed Variation (B25), 0–1 Another revenge tilt sees Portisch open the match by turning back one of Spassky's favourite systems.
- Anthony Miles vs. Portisch, Lucerne Olympiad 1982, Reti Opening / Tarrasch Defence (A04), 0–1 Miles wants to mix it up, but finds the veteran Portisch can answer blow for blow. Portisch had a massive career edge against Miles.
- Nigel Short vs. Portisch, Linares 1990, Ruy Lopez, Modern Steinitz Variation (C75), 0–1 Crafty win over the rising star Short, who is 28 years younger.
