= Robert Hübner =

German chess grandmaster (1948–2025)

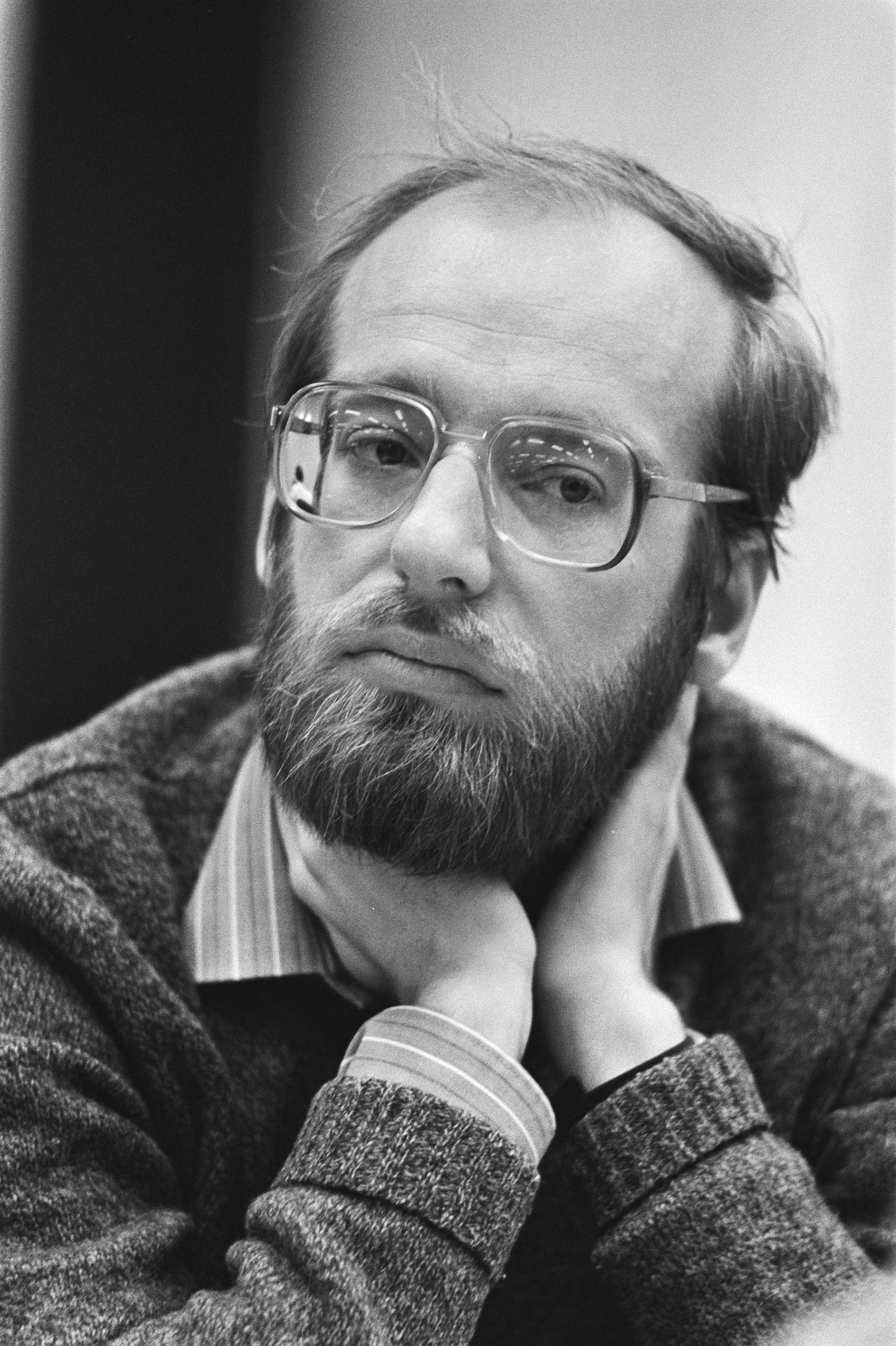
- Hübner in 1983

Personal information
- Born: 6 November 1948 Cologne, Germany
- Died: 5 January 2025 (aged 76) Cologne, Germany

Chess career
- Country: Germany
- Title: Grandmaster (1971)
- Peak rating: 2640 (July 1981)
- Peak ranking: No. 3 (July 1981)

Robert Hübner (6 November 1948 – 5 January 2025) was a German chess grandmaster, chess writer, and papyrologist. He was one of the world's leading players in the 1970s and early 1980s.

== Chess career ==
At eighteen, Hübner was joint winner of the West German Chess Championship.

In 1965 he won, together with Hans Ree, the Niemeyer tournament for European players under 20.

His International Master (IM) title was awarded in 1969 and his Grandmaster (GM) title in 1971. He reached third place in the FIDE world ranking list in 1980.

Between 1971 and 1991 (loss to Jan Timman), Hübner played in four Candidates Tournaments for the World Championship. Three ended in controversial circumstances:

- In 1971, he forfeited a closely contested quarter final to Tigran Petrosian, after blundering a piece in the 7th game in a drawn position.
- In 1980–81, his best result, after winning the quarter and semi final (against the Hungarian players Adorjan and Portisch), he reached the final before losing to Viktor Korchnoi. Hübner forfeited the match after 10 games when he was down 1 point.
- In 1983, he lost a quarter final to Vasily Smyslov in unique circumstances: with the match tied after the original 10 games plus 4 further games, the tie was resolved (in Smyslov's favour) by a spin of a roulette wheel.

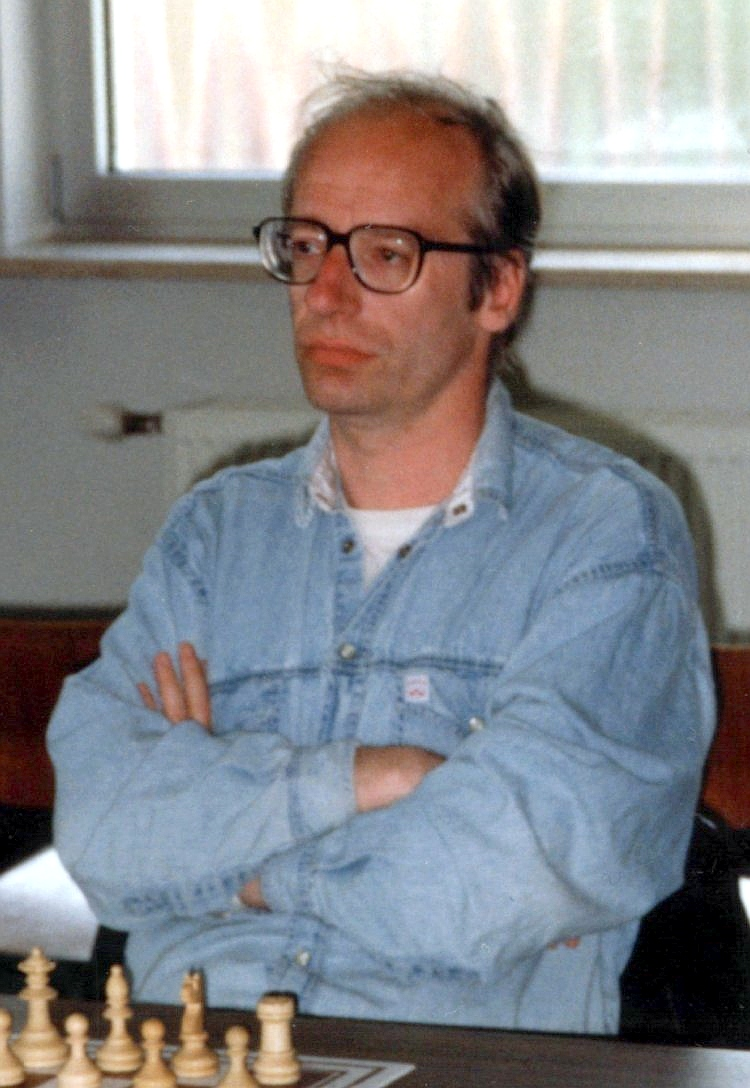
Hübner in 1993

At his strongest in the mid-seventies to mid-eighties, Hübner participated in many of the elite tournaments of the day, and was invited at Montreal 1979 (The Tournament of Stars), playing alongside Anatoly Karpov, Mikhail Tal, and Jan Timman. His most notable tournament victories were at Houston 1974, Munich 1979 (shared with Ulf Andersson and Boris Spassky), Rio de Janeiro Interzonal 1979 (shared with Lajos Portisch and Tigran Petrosian), Chicago 1982, Biel 1984 (equal with Vlastimil Hort), Linares 1985 (shared with Ljubomir Ljubojević), and Tilburg 1985 (shared with Anthony Miles and Viktor Korchnoi).

He served as a second to Nigel Short in the 1993 world championship match against Garry Kasparov.

In 2000 he won, with the German team, a silver medal in the 34th Chess Olympiad in Istanbul.

He remained active on the international circuit into the 2000s but was never a full-time chess professional due to his academic career.

== Playing style ==
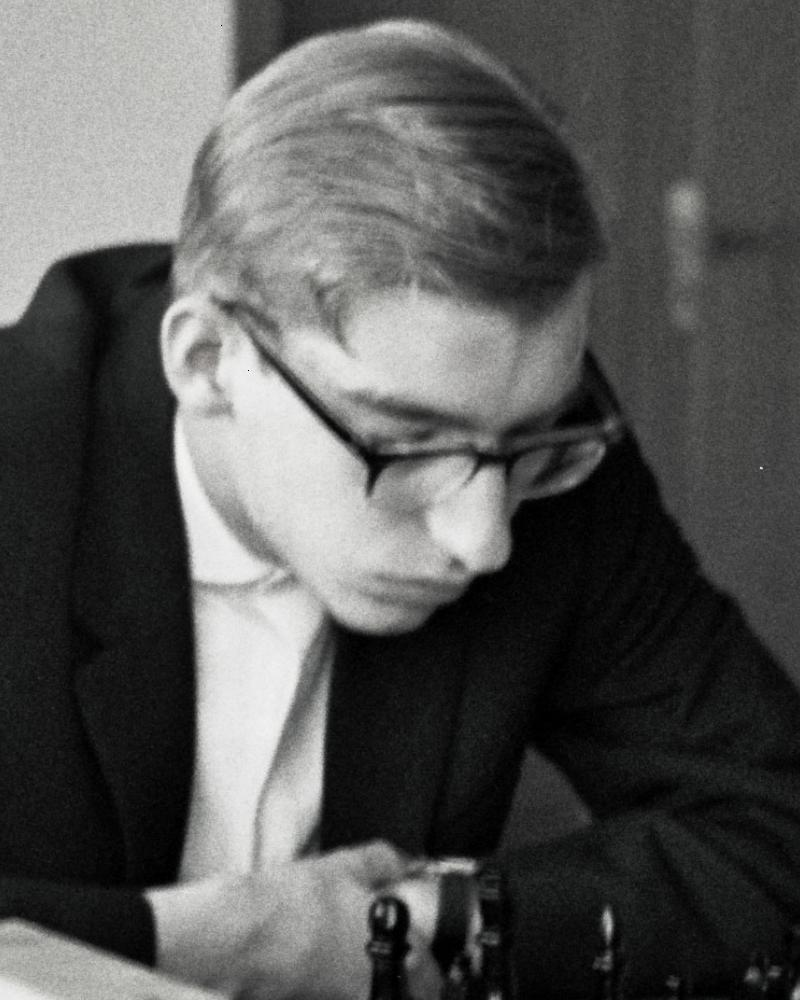
Hübner at Porz in 1966

Over the chessboard, Hübner's technique has been described as efficient and ruthless. According to Bill Hartston—"His perfectionist and rather pessimistic approach, however, prevented him from reaching the very top."

== Other contributions ==
His contributions to chess literature include the study of the playing careers of world champions and the extensive analysis of 19th-century chess brilliancies. According to chess historian Edward Winter, Hübner's great strength as a player and analyst should not cause his legacy as a chess historian and critic to be overlooked.

The variation 1.d4 Nf6 2.c4 e6 3.Nc3 Bb4 4.e3 c5 5.Bd3 Nc6 6.Nf3 Bxc3+ in the Nimzo-Indian Defence is named after Hübner.

When anti-doping tests were introduced into international chess, Hübner declared his withdrawal from the German national team. He viewed these tests as bureaucratic-power displays that degrade the individual. In his opinion, doping in chess cannot improve the true abilities of a player, only their application to the game. "I am always happy if my opponent's abilities can fully unfold, because then I learn more," he has said.

In addition to chess, Hübner was known as one of the world's best xiangqi players not from China.

== Personal life ==
Hübner was born in Cologne on 6 November 1948, and died in a hospital in Cologne on 5 January 2025, at the age of 76. Two years prior to his death, he was diagnosed with stomach cancer and underwent a difficult operation.

He spoke a dozen languages.

== Notable games ==
- Robert James Fischer vs. Robert Hübner, Palma de Mallorca iz 1970, Caro-Kann defense: King’s Indian attack, ½–½ A dramatic game with central pawn attacks against GM Robert James Fischer.
- Robert Hübner vs. Raymond Keene, Vienna (Austria) 1972, Modern Defense: King Pawn Fianchetto (B06), 1–0 After a long series of manoeuvres the White pressure on the Black king position peaks in a winning combination.
