= World Chess Championship 1981 =

Chess match between Anatoly Karpov and Viktor Korchnoi

	Defending champion	Challenger
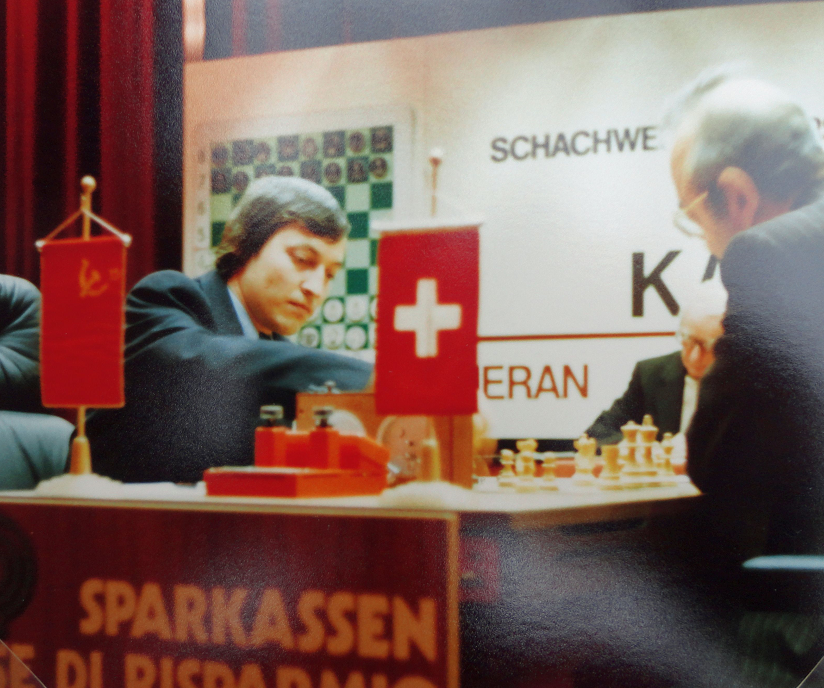
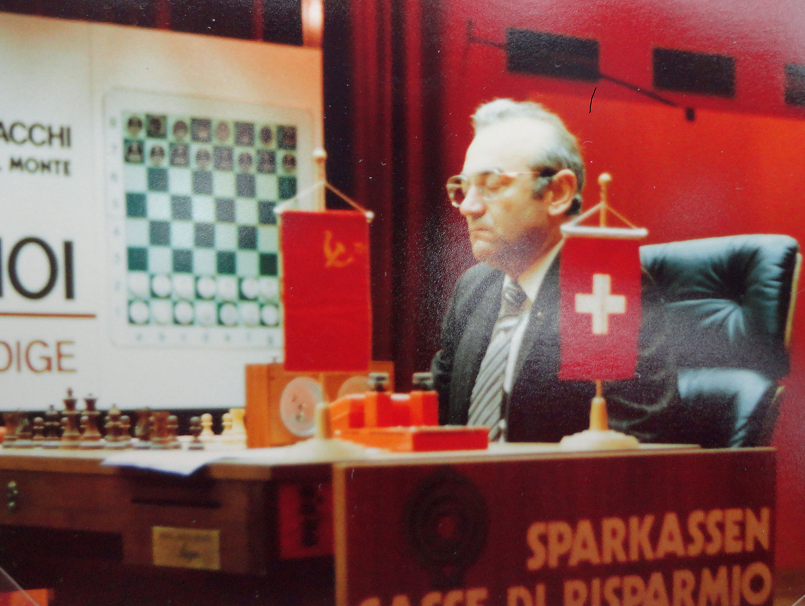
	Anatoly Karpov	Viktor Korchnoi
	(Soviet Union) Anatoly Karpov	(Switzerland) Viktor Korchnoi
6	Scores	2
	Born 23 May 1951; 30 years old	Born 23 March 1931; 50 years old
	Winner of the 1978 World Chess Championship	Winner of the 1980 Candidates Tournament
	Rating: 2700 (World No. 1)	Rating: 2695 (World No. 2)

The 1981 World Chess Championship was played between Anatoly Karpov and Viktor Korchnoi in Merano, Italy from October 1 to November 19, 1981. Karpov won with six wins against two, with 10 draws. The two players had already played against each other in the World Chess Championship match 1978 in the Philippines, when Karpov also won.

== 1979 Interzonal tournaments ==
Two Interzonals were held in 1979, one in Riga and the other in Rio de Janeiro.

September–October 1979 Interzonal, Riga
		Rating	1	2	3	4	5	6	7	8	9	10	11	12	13	14	15	16	17	18	Total	Tie break
1	Mikhail Tal (Soviet Union)	2615	-	1	½	½	1	1	½	1	1	1	1	½	1	½	½	1	1	1	14	
2	Lev Polugaevsky (Soviet Union)	2625	0	-	½	½	1	½	1	1	0	1	½	1	½	½	1	½	1	1	11½	
3	András Adorján (Hungary)	2525	½	½	-	½	0	0	1	½	1	1	½	½	1	1	½	1	1	½	11	85.75
4	Zoltán Ribli (Hungary)	2595	½	½	½	-	0	1	0	½	½	1	½	1	1	½	1	½	1	1	11	84.75
5	Oleg Romanishin (Soviet Union)	2560	0	0	1	1	-	½	1	0	½	½	1	1	½	1	½	½	1	½	10½	83.00
6	Florin Gheorghiu (Romania)	2540	0	½	1	0	½	-	½	1	½	½	½	½	1	1	1	1	0	1	10½	79.75
7	Bent Larsen (Denmark)	2620	½	0	0	1	0	½	-	0	½	1	½	1	½	1	1	1	½	1	10	
8	Gennady Kuzmin (Soviet Union)	2565	0	0	½	½	1	0	1	-	½	1	½	½	½	½	1	½	0	1	9	71.00
9	Vitaly Tseshkovsky (Soviet Union)	2560	0	1	0	½	½	½	½	½	-	0	0	½	½	1	1	1	1	½	9	67.50
10	Tony Miles (England)	2560	0	0	0	0	½	½	0	0	1	-	½	½	1	1	1	1	1	1	9	59.25
11	James Tarjan (United States)	2525	0	½	½	½	0	½	½	½	1	½	-	0	1	0	0	1	½	1	8	
12	Yehuda Gruenfeld (Israel)	2430	½	0	½	0	0	½	0	½	½	½	1	-	0	0	1F	1	½	1	7½	
13	Ljubomir Ljubojević (Yugoslavia)	2590	0	½	0	0	½	0	½	½	½	0	0	1	-	1	½	½	1	0	6½	
14	Herman Claudius van Riemsdijk (Brazil)	2435	½	½	0	½	0	0	0	½	0	0	1	1	0	-	½	½	½	0	5½	46.25
15	Slim Bouaziz (Tunisia)	2420	½	0	½	0	½	0	0	0	0	0	1	0F	½	½	-	0	1	1	5½	40.75
16	Edmar Mednis (United States)	2510	0	½	0	½	½	0	0	½	0	0	0	0	½	½	1	-	½	1	5½	39.00
17	Francisco Trois (Brazil)	2415	0	0	0	0	0	1	½	1	0	0	½	½	0	½	0	½	-	½	5	
18	Ruben Rodríguez (Philippines)	2370	0	0	½	0	½	0	0	0	½	0	0	0	1	1	0	0	½	-	4	

The Riga interzonal was won in dominant fashion by Tal, who went through the tournament undefeated ahead of Polugaevsky. They were joined in the Candidates Tournament by Adorján, whose better tie-break score in the main tournament put him ahead of Ribli, after the two drew a playoff in Budapest 3-3. The game between Gruenfeld and Bouaziz was not played, as part of the Arab boycott of Israeli sportspeople. Bouaziz forfeited and Gruenfeld received a point.

1979 Interzonal, Rio de Janeiro
		Rating	1	2	3	4	5	6	7	8	9	10	11	12	13	14	15	16	17	18	Total	Tie break
1	Lajos Portisch (Hungary)	2640	-	½	½	½	0	1	1	0	1	½	½	1	1	1	1	1	1	0	11½	93.00
2	Tigran Petrosian (Soviet Union)	2610	½	-	½	½	½	1	½	½	1	½	½	½	1	½	1	1	½	1	11½	92.25
3	Robert Hübner (West Germany)	2595	½	½	-	½	1	½	1	1	½	1	0	½	½	½	½	1	1	1	11½	92.00
4	Jan Timman (Netherlands)	2625	½	½	½	-	½	½	0	1	1	½	1	1	½	1	½	½	½	1	11	
5	Jaime Sunye Neto (Brazil)	2375	1	½	0	½	-	0	1	0	0	½	1	1	½	1	1	½	½	½	9½	77.75
6	Borislav Ivkov (Yugoslavia)	2525	0	0	½	½	1	-	½	1	½	1	½	½	½	½	½	½	½	1	9½	76.00
7	Yuri Balashov (Soviet Union)	2600	0	½	0	1	0	½	-	½	1	½	½	½	½	½	1	½	½	1	9	71.25
8	Eugenio Torre (Philippines)	2520	1	½	0	0	1	0	½	-	0	0	½	½	1	½	1	1	1	½	9	70.00
9	Gyula Sax (Hungary)	2590	0	0	½	0	1	½	0	1	-	½	½	1	0	1	0	1	1	1	9	68.00
10	Leonid Shamkovich (United States)	2495	½	½	0	½	½	0	½	1	½	-	1	½	1	1	0	0	½	½	8½	71.75
11	Jan Smejkal (Czechoslovakia)	2560	½	½	1	0	0	½	½	½	½	0	-	½	1	0	½	1	1	½	8½	68.75
12	Rafael Vaganian (Soviet Union)	2570	0	½	½	0	0	½	½	½	0	½	½	-	0	1	1	1	½	1	8	
13	Guillermo Garcia Gonzales (Cuba)	2490	0	0	½	½	½	½	½	0	1	0	0	1	-	1	0	½	1	½	7½	59.50
14	Dragoljub Velimirović (Yugoslavia)	2515	0	½	½	0	0	½	½	½	0	0	1	0	0	-	1	1	1	1	7½	55.25
15	Khosro Harandi (Iran)	2410	0	0	½	½	0	½	0	0	1	1	½	0	1	0	-	0	½	1	6½	
16	Luis Marcos Bronstein (Argentina)	2420	0	0	0	½	½	½	½	0	0	1	0	0	½	0	1	-	½	1	6	
17	Jean Hébert (Canada)	2365	0	½	0	½	½	½	½	0	0	½	0	½	0	0	½	½	-	0	4½	39.75
18	Shimon Kagan (Israel)	2445	1	0	0	0	½	0	0	½	0	½	½	0	½	0	0	0	1	-	4½	37.50

The Interzonal in Rio saw Portisch, Petrosian and Hübner share first place between them and all three advanced to the Candidates Tournament.

Home favourite Henrique Mecking (rating 2615) had to withdraw after two rounds, having drawn both his games against Ivkov and Smejkal. His results weren't counted in the totals for the other players. The surprise of the tournament was the untitled Brazilian Jaime Sunye Neto, who was among the leaders during the mid-stage of the tournament before three consecutive losses wrecked his chances of qualifying.

== 1980/81 Candidates Tournament ==
Korchnoi, the loser of the last championship match, and Spassky, the loser of the last Candidates final, were seeded directly into the tournament and joined by the top three from each of the two Interzonals.

Quarterfinals
Velden, Mar 1980
(Switzerland) Viktor Korchnoi	5½
(Soviet Union) Tigran Petrosian	3½
Alma Ata, Mar–Apr 1980
(Soviet Union) Lev Polugaevsky	5½
(Soviet Union) Mikhail Tal	2½
Mexico City, Mar–May 1980
(Hungary) Lajos Portisch	7
(Soviet Union) Boris Spassky	7
Bad Lauterberg, Mar–Apr 1980
(Hungary) András Adorján	4½
(West Germany) Robert Hübner	5½

Semifinals
Buenos Aires, July–Aug 1980
(Switzerland) Viktor Korchnoi	7½
(Soviet Union) Lev Polugaevsky	6½
Abano Terme, Aug 1980
(Hungary) Lajos Portisch	4½
(West Germany) Robert Hübner	6½

Final
Merano, Dec 1980–Jan 1981
(Switzerland) Viktor Korchnoi	4½
(West Germany) Robert Hübner (forfeit)	3½

When the quarterfinal between Portisch and Spassky was tied after 14 games, Portisch was declared the winner because he had won more games with Black.

The final was best of 16. Hübner resigned after 10 games (8 concluded, 2 adjourned), leaving Korchnoi the winner. Hübner was leading by one point after six games, but made a shocking one-move blunder in Game 7 (allowing a simple knight fork), and then also lost Game 8.

== 1981 Championship match ==
The first player to win six games would be Champion.

World Chess Championship Match 1981
	1	2	3	4	5	6	7	8	9	10	11	12	13	14	15	16	17	18	Wins	Total
Anatoly Karpov (Soviet Union)	1	1	=	1	=	0	=	=	1	=	=	=	0	1	=	=	=	1	6	11
Viktor Korchnoi (Switzerland)	0	0	=	0	=	1	=	=	0	=	=	=	1	0	=	=	=	0	2	7

Karpov won. This 6–2 victory, much more decisive than Karpov's win in the World Chess Championship 1978, has been dubbed "The Massacre in Merano".

The headlines of the tournament again largely centered on the political issues. Korchnoi's wife and son had been denied emigration and were still in the Soviet Union. In 1980, his son had been promised release to join his father in exile if he gave up his passport. When he did so, he was promptly drafted into the Soviet army. In spite of protests, he was arrested for evading army service, sentenced to two and a half years in a labour camp, and served the full sentence. After his release in 1982, Korchnoi's wife and son were allowed to leave the USSR.

== Games ==
Game 1
White: Korchnoi, Viktor
Black: Karpov, Anatoly
Queen's Gambit Declined, Tartakower (Makogonov–Bondarevsky) system
Result: 0–1
1.c4 e6 2.Nc3 d5 3.d4 Be7 4.Nf3 Nf6 5.Bg5 h6 6.Bh4 0-0 7.e3 b6 8.Rc1 Bb7 9.Be2 Nbd7 10.cxd5 exd5 11.0-0 c5 12.dxc5 bxc5 13.Qc2 Rc8 14.Rfd1 Qb6 15.Qb1 Rfd8 16.Rc2 Qe6 17.Bg3 Nh5 18.Rcd2 Nxg3 19.hxg3 Nf6 20.Qc2 g6 21.Qa4 a6 22.Bd3 Kg7 23.Bb1 Qb6 24.a3 d4 25.Ne2 dxe3 26.fxe3 c4 27.Ned4 Qc7 28.Nh4 Qe5 29.Kh1 Kg8 30.Ndf3 Qxg3 31.Rxd8+ Bxd8 32.Qb4 Be4 33.Bxe4 Nxe4 34.Rd4 Nf2+ 35.Kg1 Nd3 36.Qb7 Rb8 37.Qd7 Bc7 38.Kh1 Rxb2 39.Rxd3 cxd3 40.Qxd3 Qd6 41.Qe4 Qd1+ 42.Ng1 Qd6 43.Nhf3 Rb5 0–1

Remarks: Karpov marched out to a victory in Game 1. Korchnoi resigned on move 44, down the exchange and a pawn and with an inferior position.

Game 2
White: Karpov, Anatoly
Black: Korchnoi, Viktor
Ruy Lopez, Berlin Defence, Open variation
Result: 1–0
1.e4 e5 2.Nf3 Nc6 3.Bb5 Nf6 4.0-0 Nxe4 5.d4 Be7 6.Qe2 Nd6 7.Bxc6 bxc6 8.dxe5 Nb7 9.Nc3 0-0 10.Re1 Nc5 11.Be3 Ne6 12.Rad1 d5 13.exd6 cxd6 14.Nd4 Bd7 15.Nf5 d5 16.Nxe7+ Qxe7 17.Qd2 Qh4 18.Ne2 Rfe8 19.b3 Re7 20.Ng3 Qf6 21.f3 Be8 22.Ne2 h6 23.Bf2 Qg6 24.Nc1 d4 25.Nd3 Qf6 26.Bg3 Rd7 27.Re5 Qd8 28.Rde1 Rd5 29.Rxd5 Qxd5 30.Re5 Qd7 31.Qe1 Rc8 32.b4 Qd8 33.Ra5 Qd7 34.h3 f6 35.Rxa7 Qd5 36.Ra5 Qd7 37.Ra7 Qd5 38.Ra5 Qd7 39.Qe4 Bf7 40.Qf5 Re8 41.Kh2 Qb7 42.a3 Rd8 43.h4 h5 44.Nf2 Qd7 45.Ra6 Qe8 46.Qa5 Bg6 47.Nd3 Kh7 48.Qb6 Rc8 49.a4 Bf5 50.a5 c5 51.bxc5 Bxd3 52.cxd3 Nxc5 53.Ra7 Qg6 54.Rc7 Rxc7 55.Bxc7 Nxd3 56.Qxd4 Ne5 57.Bxe5 1–0

Remarks: Karpov also won Game 2, a Ruy Lopez (Berlin) opening. Korchnoi resigned on move 57. If he recaptures the bishop with 57...fxe5, then 58.Qe4 forces off the queens and Black's king is too far away to stop his opponent's passed pawn from queening.

Game 3
White: Korchnoi, Viktor
Black: Karpov, Anatoly
Queen's Gambit Declined, Tartakower (Makogonov–Bondarevsky) system
Result: ½–½
1.c4 e6 2.Nc3 d5 3.d4 Be7 4.Nf3 Nf6 5.Bg5 h6 6.Bh4 0-0 7.e3 b6 8.Rc1 Bb7 9.Be2 dxc4 10.Bxc4 Nbd7 11.0-0 c5 12.Qe2 a6 13.a4 Ne4 14.Nxe4 Bxe4 15.Bg3 Qc8 16.dxc5 bxc5 17.Nd2 Bc6 18.b3 Rd8 19.Bd3 Qb7 20.f3 Nf6 21.Rfd1 Nd5 22.e4 Nb4 23.Bb1 Be8 24.e5 Nc6 25.Bf2 Nd4 26.Bxd4 Rxd4 27.Be4 Bc6 28.Bxc6 Qxc6 29.Nc4 Rad8 30.Rxd4 cxd4 31.Qd3 Bb4 32.g3 Rb8 33.Kg2 Bc3 34.Rb1 Qd5 35.h4 h5 36.Kf2 Bb4 37.Kg2 Be7 38.Rd1 Qb7 39.Rb1 Qd5 40.Rb2 Bb4 41.Rb1 ½–½

Remarks: Game 3 was drawn on move 42 with both sides having equal positions and material.

Game 4
White: Karpov, Anatoly
Black: Korchnoi, Viktor
Petrov's Defence
Result: 1–0
1.e4 e5 2.Nf3 Nf6 3.Nxe5 d6 4.Nf3 Nxe4 5.d4 d5 6.Bd3 Be7 7.0-0 Nc6 8.Re1 Bf5 9.Bb5 Bf6 10.Nbd2 0-0 11.Nf1 Ne7 12.c3 Ng6 13.Bd3 Nd6 14.Bxf5 Nxf5 15.Qb3 b6 16.Qb5 a6 17.Qd3 Qd7 18.Ng3 Nxg3 19.hxg3 a5 20.Bg5 Bxg5 21.Nxg5 Rfe8 22.b3 Rad8 23.Nf3 f6 24.Nd2 Kf7 25.Nf1 h5 26.Rxe8 Rxe8 27.Qf3 Rh8 28.Ne3 Ne7 29.Re1 g6 30.Qf4 Kg7 31.g4 g5 32.Qf3 hxg4 33.Nxg4 Qd6 34.g3 c6 35.c4 f5 36.Qe3 Ng6 37.c5 Qd8 38.Ne5 bxc5 39.Nxc6 Qf6 40.Qe6 cxd4 41.Qxd5 d3 42.Qd7+ Qf7 43.Ne7 Kh7 44.Kg2 Re8 45.Rh1+ Nh4+ 46.gxh4 Qxe7 47.Qxf5+ Kg7 48.hxg5 Qb7+ 49.f3 Re2+ 50.Kf1 Kg8 51.Qxd3 Re6 52.Qd8+ Kg7 53.Qd4+ 1–0

Remarks: Karpov won his third game in a queen ending with overpowering material advantage (both sides possessing a Rook & Queen, but White with a 3 pawn advantage).

Game 5
White: Korchnoi, Viktor
Black: Karpov, Anatoly
Queen's Gambit Declined
Result: ½–½
1.c4 e6 2.Nc3 d5 3.d4 Be7 4.Nf3 Nf6 5.Bg5 h6 6.Bh4 0-0 7.Rc1 b6 8.cxd5 Nxd5 9.Nxd5 exd5 10.Bxe7 Qxe7 11.g3 Ba6 12.e3 c5 13.dxc5 bxc5 14.Bxa6 Nxa6 15.Qxd5 Nb4 16.Qc4 Qf6 17.Nh4 Qxb2 18.0-0 Qxa2 19.Qxa2 Nxa2 20.Rxc5 Rfc8 21.Ra5 Nc1 22.Nf5 Rc7 23.Nd4 Rb8 24.Ra1 Nd3 25.Rfd1 Ne5 26.Ra2 g6 27.Rda1 Rbb7 28.h3 h5 29.Kg2 Kg7 30.Ra5 Nc6 31.Nxc6 Rxc6 32.Rxa7 Rxa7 33.Rxa7 Rc2 34.e4 Rc3 35.Ra2 Kf6 36.f3 Rb3 37.Kf2 Rc3 38.Ke2 Rb3 39.Ra6+ Ke7 40.Ra5 Kf6 41.Rd5 Ra3 42.Rd6+ Kg7 43.h4 Rb3 44.Rd3 Rb5 45.Ke3 ½–½

Remarks: This game resulted in a rook ending where White was up a pawn, but he was unable to win.

Game 6
White: Karpov, Anatoly
Black: Korchnoi, Viktor
Ruy Lopez, Open, 9.c3
Result: 0–1
1.e4 e5 2.Nf3 Nc6 3.Bb5 a6 4.Ba4 Nf6 5.0-0 Nxe4 6.d4 b5 7.Bb3 d5 8.dxe5 Be6 9.c3 Bc5 10.Nbd2 0-0 11.Bc2 Bf5 12.Nb3 Bg6 13.Nfd4 Bxd4 14.cxd4 a5 15.Be3 a4 16.Nc1 a3 17.b3 f6 18.exf6 Qxf6 19.Ne2 Nb4 20.Bb1 Qe7 21.Qe1 Rfe8 22.Nf4 Bf7 23.Qc1 c5 24.dxc5 Qf6 25.Bxe4 Rxe4 26.Ne2 d4 27.Ng3 Ree8 28.Qd2 Nc6 29.Bg5 Qe5 30.Rac1 d3 31.Rfd1 Bg6 32.Be3 Re6 33.Bf4 Qf6 34.Re1 Rae8 35.Rxe6 Rxe6 36.Rb1 h5 37.h3 h4 38.Bg5 Qd4 39.Be3 Qd5 40.Nf1 Be4 41.Bf4 Bxg2 0–1

Remarks: Game 6 ended with equal material, but Karpov could not defend against the onslaught on his king's position. Korchnoi thus scored his first win in the match.

Game 7
White: Korchnoi, Viktor
Black: Karpov, Anatoly
Queen's Gambit Declined
Result: ½–½
1.c4 e6 2.Nc3 d5 3.d4 Be7 4.Nf3 Nf6 5.Bg5 h6 6.Bh4 0-0 7.Rc1 b6 8.cxd5 Nxd5 9.Nxd5 exd5 10.Bxe7 Qxe7 11.g3 Ba6 12.e3 c5 13.dxc5 Bb7 14.Bg2 bxc5 15.0-0 Nd7 16.Qb3 Rfb8 17.Qa3 Qe6 18.Rfd1 a5 19.Ne1 a4 20.Nd3 d4 21.Bxb7 Rxb7 22.exd4 cxd4 23.Re1 Qd5 24.Rc2 Nf8 25.Nf4 Qa5 26.Rce2 Qb5 27.Qf3 Rab8 28.h4 Qf5 29.Re5 Qf6 30.Qd5 Rxb2 31.Rf5 ½–½

Remarks: Black was effectively stymied in this Queen's Gambit Declined despite being ahead a pawn.

Game 8
White: Karpov, Anatoly
Black: Korchnoi, Viktor
Giuoco Piano
Result: ½–½
1.e4 e5 2.Nf3 Nc6 3.Bc4 Bc5 4.c3 Nf6 5.d3 d6 6.Nbd2 a6 7.0-0 0-0 8.Bb3 Ba7 9.h3 Be6 10.Bc2 d5 11.Re1 dxe4 12.dxe4 Nh5 13.Nf1 Qxd1 14.Rxd1 Rad8 15.Be3 f6 16.Bxa7 Nxa7 17.Ne3 Nf4 18.h4 Bf7 19.Ne1 Nc8 20.f3 Ne6 21.Nd3 Rd7 22.Bb3 Ne7 23.Nd5 Nc6 24.Ba4 b5 25.Bc2 Rfd8 26.a4 Kf8 27.g3 Rd6 28.b4 Ne7 29.Ne3 Rc6 30.Ra3 Nc8 31.axb5 axb5 32.Kf2 Nb6 33.Nb2 Rxd1 34.Bxd1 Rd6 35.Be2 Be8 36.Ra5 Rd8 37.Ke1 c6 38.Ra6 Rb8 39.Bd1 Nc8 40.Nd3 Nc7 41.Ra5 Ra8 42.f4 exf4 43.gxf4 Nb6 44.Bf3 Rd8 45.Be2 Na4 46.Ra7 Rd7 47.Kd2 Ne6 48.Rxd7 Bxd7 49.Bg4 g6 50.f5 gxf5 51.Bxf5 Kg7 52.e5 Nf8 53.Bxd7 Nxd7 54.e6 Ndb6 55.Nf4 Kf8 56.Kd3 Nc8 57.Ng4 Ke7 58.Nh6 Kd6 59.Kd4 Ne7 60.Nf7+ Kc7 61.Nh5 c5+ 62.bxc5 Nc6+ 63.Ke3 Nxc5 64.Nxf6 Nxe6 65.h5 Nf8 66.Ke4 Kb6 67.Ng5 h6 68.Nf7 Ne6 69.Ne8 Nc5+ 70.Ke3 Na4 71.Kd2 b4 72.cxb4 Nxb4 73.Nxh6 Nc5 74.Nf5 Nd5 75.h6 Ne4+ 76.Kd3 Ng5 77.Kd4 Kc6 78.Nfg7 Ne7 79.Nf6 Ng6 80.Nf5 Nf7 81.h7 Ng5 82.Ne7+ Kb7 83.Nxg6 Nxh7 84.Nxh7 ½–½

Remarks: A very unusual game. For one, it utilized the Giuoco Piano, a quiet opening seldom seen in high-level play. It also developed into a relatively rare knight ending that culminated in two White knights versus a lone king, a position discussed in many chess books, but rarely seen in actual play (see two knights endgame). As it is impossible to force checkmate this way, the game ended in a draw.

Game 9
White: Korchnoi, Viktor
Black: Karpov, Anatoly
Queen's Gambit Declined
Result: 0–1
1.c4 e6 2.Nc3 d5 3.d4 Be7 4.Nf3 Nf6 5.Bg5 h6 6.Bh4 0-0 7.Rc1 dxc4 8.e3 c5 9.Bxc4 cxd4 10.exd4 Nc6 11.0-0 Nh5 12.Bxe7 Nxe7 13.Bb3 Nf6 14.Ne5 Bd7 15.Qe2 Rc8 16.Ne4 Nxe4 17.Qxe4 Bc6 18.Nxc6 Rxc6 19.Rc3 Qd6 20.g3 Rd8 21.Rd1 Rb6 22.Qe1 Qd7 23.Rcd3 Rd6 24.Qe4 Qc6 25.Qf4 Nd5 26.Qd2 Qb6 27.Bxd5 Rxd5 28.Rb3 Qc6 29.Qc3 Qd7 30.f4 b6 31.Rb4 b5 32.a4 bxa4 33.Qa3 a5 34.Rxa4 Qb5 35.Rd2 e5 36.fxe5 Rxe5 37.Qa1 Qe8 38.dxe5 Rxd2 39.Rxa5 Qc6 40.Ra8+ Kh7 41.Qb1+ g6 42.Qf1 Qc5+ 43.Kh1 Qd5+ 0–1

Remarks: After two draws, Karpov scored another win by forcing his opponent into a position where he could not protect his pawns and at the same time guard against mate.

Game 10
White: Karpov, Anatoly
Black: Korchnoi, Viktor
Giuoco Piano
Result: ½–½
1.e4 e5 2.Nf3 Nc6 3.Bc4 Bc5 4.c3 Nf6 5.d3 a6 6.0-0 d6 7.Re1 Ba7 8.Bb3 0-0 9.Nbd2 Be6 10.Nf1 Bxb3 11.Qxb3 Qc8 12.Ng3 Re8 13.h3 Rb8 14.Be3 Qe6 15.Qxe6 fxe6 16.Rac1 Bxe3 17.Rxe3 Rbd8 18.d4 Rd7 19.Kf1 Kf8 20.Rd1 h6 21.dxe5 Nxe5 22.Nxe5 dxe5 23.Rxd7 Nxd7 24.Ke2 Ke7 25.Nf1 b5 26.Nd2 c5 27.Rg3 Rg8 28.b3 Nb8 29.a4 Nc6 30.axb5 axb5 31.h4 Kf7 32.Rf3+ ½–½

Remarks: Karpov employs the Giuoco Piano again, leading to both sides drawing behind their pawn walls.

Game 11
White: Korchnoi, Viktor
Black: Karpov, Anatoly
Queen's Gambit Declined
Result: ½–½
1.c4 e6 2.Nc3 d5 3.d4 Be7 4.Nf3 Nf6 5.Bf4 0-0 6.e3 c5 7.dxc5 Bxc5 8.Qc2 Nc6 9.Rd1 Qa5 10.a3 Be7 11.Nd2 e5 12.Bg5 d4 13.Nb3 Qd8 14.Be2 a5 15.exd4 a4 16.Nxa4 Nxd4 17.Nxd4 exd4 18.b3 Qa5+ 19.Qd2 Bxa3 20.Qxa5 Rxa5 21.Bxf6 Bb4+ 22.Kf1 gxf6 23.Rxd4 Re5 24.g4 b5 25.cxb5 Bb7 26.f3 Rfe8 27.Bd1 Rxb5 28.Kg2 Kg7 29.Kf2 Ba5 30.Rf1 Re7 31.h3 h6 32.Bc2 Rc7 33.Rc4 Rxc4 34.bxc4 Rb4 35.c5 Bc6 ½–½

Remarks: Drawn on move 36. Despite Black's material advantage, he finds himself unable to achieve a breakthrough.

Game 12
White: Karpov, Anatoly
Black: Korchnoi, Viktor
English Opening
Result: ½–½
1.c4 Nf6 2.Nc3 d5 3.cxd5 Nxd5 4.Nf3 Nxc3 5.bxc3 g6 6.d4 Bg7 7.e3 c5 8.Bb5+ Nd7 9.0-0 0-0 10.a4 a6 11.Bd3 b6 12.Rb1 Bb7 13.e4 Qc7 14.Re1 e6 15.e5 h6 16.h4 Rfd8 17.Bf4 Nf8 18.Be3 Rab8 19.Qe2 Bc6 20.Bxa6 cxd4 21.cxd4 Bxa4 22.Nd2 Qc6 23.Rec1 Qa8 24.Bd3 Bc6 25.f3 b5 26.Nb3 Rbc8 27.Nc5 Nd7 28.Ne4 Bxe4 29.Rxc8 Qxc8 30.Bxe4 Qc4 31.Bd3 Qc3 32.Bxb5 Nb6 33.Qd3 Nd5 34.Bf2 h5 35.Qxc3 Nxc3 36.Rb3 Nd1 37.Rd3 Nxf2 38.Kxf2 Rb8 39.Bc4 Rb2+ 40.Kg3 Rb4 41.Rc3 Rb8 42.f4 Rc8 43.Kf2 Bf8 44.Ke3 Bb4 45.Rc1 Ba3 46.Rc2 Bb4 47.Rc1 ½–½

Remarks: Another draw with both kings secure behind their pawns.

Game 13
White: Korchnoi, Viktor
Black: Karpov, Anatoly
Queen's Gambit Declined
Result: 1–0
1.c4 e6 2.Nc3 d5 3.d4 Be7 4.cxd5 exd5 5.Bf4 c6 6.e3 Bf5 7.g4 Be6 8.h3 Nf6 9.Nf3 0-0 10.Bd3 c5 11.Kf1 Nc6 12.Kg2 Rc8 13.Rc1 Re8 14.dxc5 Bxc5 15.Nb5 Bf8 16.Nfd4 Nxd4 17.Rxc8 Qxc8 18.exd4 Qd7 19.Nc7 Rc8 20.Nxe6 fxe6 21.Re1 a6 22.g5 Ne4 23.Qg4 Bb4 24.Re2 Rf8 25.f3 Qf7 26.Be5 Nd2 27.a3 Nxf3 28.g6 hxg6 29.Bg3 Be7 30.Rf2 Ne1+ 31.Kh2 Qxf2+ 32.Bxf2 Nxd3 33.Qxe6+ Rf7 34.Bg3 Nxb2 35.Qxd5 Bf6 36.Bd6 g5 37.Qb3 Bxd4 38.Qe6 g6 39.Qe8+ Kg7 40.Be5+ Bxe5+ 41.Qxe5+ Kh7 1–0

Remarks: Korchnoi wins his second and last victory of the match. Karpov resigned on move 42, his rook is no match for White's queen.

Game 14
White: Karpov, Anatoly
Black: Korchnoi, Viktor
Ruy Lopez, Open (Tarrasch) Defence
Result: 1–0
1.e4 e5 2.Nf3 Nc6 3.Bb5 a6 4.Ba4 Nf6 5.0-0 Nxe4 6.d4 b5 7.Bb3 d5 8.dxe5 Be6 9.Nbd2 Nc5 10.c3 d4 11.Bxe6 Nxe6 12.cxd4 Ncxd4 13.Ne4 Be7 14.Be3 Nxf3+ 15.Qxf3 0-0 16.Rfd1 Qe8 17.Nf6+ Bxf6 18.exf6 Qc8 19.fxg7 Rd8 20.h4 c5 21.Rac1 Qc7 22.h5 Qe5 23.h6 Qxb2 24.Rd7 Rxd7 25.Qxa8+ Rd8 26.Qxa6 Qe2 27.Rf1 Rd1 28.Qa8+ Rd8 29.Qc6 b4 30.Qa4 Qd3 31.Rc1 Qd5 32.Qb3 Qe4 33.Qc2 Qxc2 34.Rxc2 f5 35.f4 Kf7 36.g4 Rd5 37.gxf5 Rxf5 38.Rd2 Rf6 39.Rd7+ Kg8 40.f5 Rxf5 41.Re7 Nxg7 42.Rxg7+ Kh8 43.Rc7 Kg8 44.Bxc5 Rg5+ 45.Kf2 Rg6 46.Be3 1–0

Remarks: Korchnoi gets the tables turned on him in this Ruy Lopez and throws in the towel after finding himself unable to both protect his passed pawn and stop White's from queening. Earlier in the game, he had threatened mate with his queen and rook, but a counterthrust by Karpov forced him to call it off.

Game 15
White: Korchnoi, Viktor
Black: Karpov, Anatoly
English Opening, Four knights, kingside Fianchetto
Result: ½–½
1.c4 Nf6 2.Nc3 e5 3.Nf3 Nc6 4.g3 Bb4 5.Nd5 Bc5 6.Bg2 d6 7.0-0 0-0 8.e3 Bg4 9.h3 Bxf3 10.Bxf3 Nxd5 11.cxd5 Ne7 12.b3 Qd7 13.Bg2 c6 14.dxc6 Nxc6 15.Bb2 d5 16.Bxe5 Nxe5 17.d4 Bd6 18.dxe5 Bxe5 19.Rc1 d4 20.Rc5 Bf6 21.Rd5 Qc7 22.exd4 Rad8 23.Qc1 Qb6 24.Rxd8 Rxd8 25.d5 g6 26.Bf3 Kg7 27.Re1 Rd7 28.Qf4 Re7 29.Rxe7 Bxe7 30.Kg2 a5 31.h4 h5 32.Be2 Bc5 33.Bc4 Qf6 34.Qd2 b6 35.a4 Qe5 36.Qd3 Qf6 37.Qd2 Qe5 38.Be2 Qe4+ 39.Bf3 Qe5 40.Bd1 Qe4+ ½–½

Remarks: Another draw with strong pawn fortifications.

Game 16
White: Karpov, Anatoly
Black: Korchnoi, Viktor
Ruy Lopez, Open (Tarrasch) Defence
Result: ½–½
1.e4 e5 2.Nf3 Nc6 3.Bb5 a6 4.Ba4 Nf6 5.0-0 Nxe4 6.d4 b5 7.Bb3 d5 8.dxe5 Be6 9.Nbd2 Nc5 10.c3 d4 11.Bxe6 Nxe6 12.cxd4 Ncxd4 13.Ne4 Be7 14.Be3 Nf5 15.Qc2 0-0 16.Neg5 Bxg5 17.Nxg5 g6 18.Nxe6 fxe6 19.Rae1 Qd5 20.b3 Rac8 21.Bc5 Rfd8 22.h3 Qc6 23.b4 Rd7 24.Rd1 Rcd8 25.Rxd7 Rxd7 26.Re1 Qd5 27.a4 Nh4 28.f3 Nf5 29.axb5 axb5 30.Qe2 Qc6 31.Rc1 Rd8 32.Be3 Qd5 33.Bf2 c6 34.Qe1 Qb3 35.Ra1 Qb2 36.Rb1 Qa2 37.Rd1 Rd5 38.Rxd5 cxd5 39.g4 Ng7 40.Bc5 h6 41.Qe3 Qc2 42.Kf1 g5 ½–½

Remarks: Drawn on move 43 with equal positions.

Game 17
White: Korchnoi, Viktor
Black: Karpov, Anatoly
Queen's Gambit Declined
Result: ½–½
1.Nf3 Nf6 2.c4 e6 3.Nc3 d5 4.d4 Be7 5.Bg5 h6 6.Bh4 0-0 7.Rc1 dxc4 8.e3 c5 9.Bxc4 cxd4 10.Nxd4 Bd7 11.Be2 Nc6 12.Nb3 Nd5 13.Bxe7 Ncxe7 14.Nxd5 Nxd5 15.Qd4 Bc6 16.Bf3 Ne7 17.Bxc6 Nxc6 18.Qxd8 Rfxd8 19.Ke2 Rac8 20.a3 Kf8 21.Rc2 Ne7 22.Rhc1 Rxc2+ 23.Rxc2 Ke8 ½–½

Remarks: Another draw with equal positions. Somewhat oddly, White did not move his kingside pawns the entire game.

Game 18
White: Karpov, Anatoly
Black: Korchnoi, Viktor
Ruy Lopez, Open (Tarrasch) Defence
Result: 1–0
1.e4 e5 2.Nf3 Nc6 3.Bb5 a6 4.Ba4 Nf6 5.0-0 Nxe4 6.d4 b5 7.Bb3 d5 8.dxe5 Be6 9.Nbd2 Nc5 10.c3 d4 11.Bxe6 Nxe6 12.cxd4 Ncxd4 13.a4 Be7 14.Nxd4 Nxd4 15.Ne4 Ne6 16.Be3 0-0 17.f4 Qxd1 18.Rfxd1 Rfb8 19.Rd7 Bf8 20.f5 Nd8 21.a5 Nc6 22.e6 fxe6 23.f6 Ne5 24.Rxc7 Rc8 25.Rac1 Rxc7 26.Rxc7 Rd8 27.h3 h6 28.Ra7 Nc4 29.Bb6 Rb8 30.Bc5 Bxc5+ 31.Nxc5 gxf6 32.b4 Rd8 33.Rxa6 Kf7 34.Ra7+ Kg6 35.Rd7 Re8 36.a6 Ra8 37.Rb7 Kf5 38.Rxb5 Ke5 39.Rb7 Kd5 40.Rf7 f5 41.Rf6 1–0

Remarks: Black could not stop his opponent's queenside pawns while also protecting his own. With this sixth win, Karpov clinched the match and successfully defended his title as world champion.
