= Karpov–Kasparov rivalry =

Rivalry between two chess grandmasters

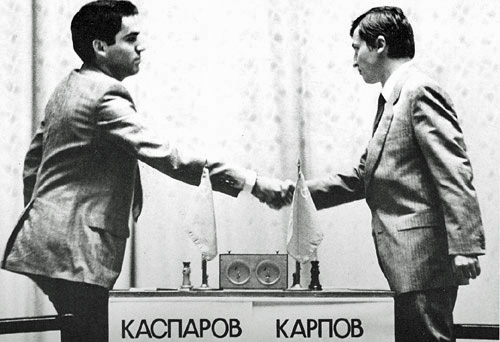
Kasparov and Karpov during the 1985 World Chess Championship

The Karpov–Kasparov rivalry was a chess rivalry that existed between grandmasters Anatoly Karpov and Garry Kasparov, who were the 12th and 13th World Chess Champions respectively. The rivalry started in the mid-1980s and culminated in Karpov and Kasparov playing five world championship matches. It has been described as the greatest rivalry in chess. The rivalry involved controversy like the 1984 meeting, which ended without a winner with Karpov leading, political elements, and extremely close matches like the 1987 meeting, where Kasparov had to win the last game to retain the title.

== Overview ==
Karpov had cemented his position as the world's best player and world champion by the time Garry Kasparov arrived on the scene. In their first match, the World Chess Championship 1984 in Moscow, the first player to win six games would win the match. Karpov built a 4–0 lead after nine games. The next 17 games were drawn, setting a record for world title matches, and it took Karpov until game 27 to gain his fifth win. In game 31, Karpov had a winning position but failed to take advantage and settled for a draw. He lost the next game, after which 14 more draws ensued. Karpov held a solidly winning position in game 41, but again blundered and had to settle for a draw. After Kasparov won games 47 and 48, FIDE President Florencio Campomanes unilaterally terminated the match, citing the players' health. Karpov is said to have lost ten kilograms (22 lb) over the course of the match. A rematch was played later in 1985, also in Moscow. The events of the Marathon Match forced FIDE to return to the previous format, with a match limited to 24 games (with Karpov remaining champion if the match finished 12–12). Karpov needed to win the final game to draw the match and retain his title but lost, surrendering the title to his opponent. The final score was 13–11 (+3−5=16) in favour of Kasparov.

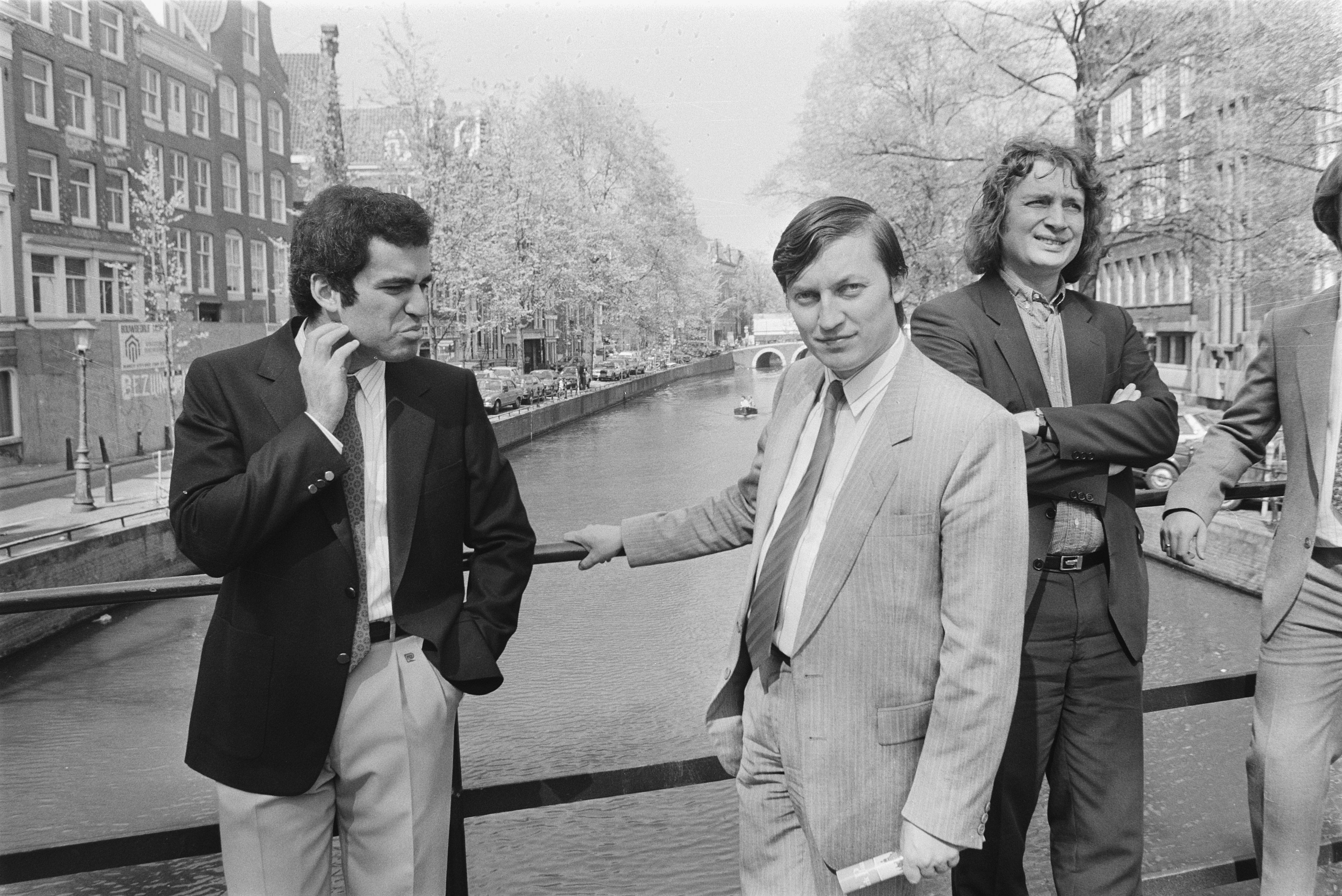
Karpov, with Kasparov (left) and Dutch grandmaster Jan Timman (right) in Amsterdam, 1987

Karpov remained a formidable opponent and the world No. 2 until the mid-1990s. He fought Kasparov in three more world championship matches in 1986 (held in London and Leningrad), 1987 (in Seville), and 1990 (in New York City and Lyon). All three matches were extremely close: the scores were 11½–12½ (+4−5=15), 12–12 (+4−4=16), and 11½–12½ (+3−4=17). In all three matches, Karpov had winning chances up to the last games. The ending of the 1987 Seville match was particularly dramatic. Karpov won the 23rd game when Kasparov miscalculated a combination. In the final game, needing only a draw to win the title, Karpov cracked under time pressure at the end of the first session of play, missed a variation leading to an almost forced draw, and allowed Kasparov to adjourn the game with an extra pawn. After a further mistake in the second session, Karpov was slowly ground down and resigned on move 64, ending the match and allowing Kasparov to keep the title.

In their five world championship matches, Karpov scored 19 wins, 21 losses, and 104 draws in 144 games. Overall, Karpov played five matches against Kasparov for the title from 1984 to 1990 without ever defeating him in a match. According to chessgames.com, as of 2022, in Classical games, Kasparov leads Karpov with 28 wins, 20 losses, and 119 draws in 167 games. Including rapid/exhibition games, Kasparov leads Karpov with 39 wins, 25 losses, and 129 draws in 193 games.

== Results of World Championship matches ==
=== 1984 ===
World Chess Championship match, September 1984 – February 1985: games 1–24
	Rating	1	2	3	4	5	6	7	8	9	10	11	12	13	14	15	16	17	18	19	20	21	22	23	24
(Soviet Union) Anatoly Karpov	2700	½	½	1	½	½	1	1	½	1	½	½	½	½	½	½	½	½	½	½	½	½	½	½	½
(Soviet Union) Garry Kasparov	2710	½	½	0	½	½	0	0	½	0	½	½	½	½	½	½	½	½	½	½	½	½	½	½	½

World Chess Championship match, September 1984 – February 1985: games 25–48
	Rating	25	26	27	28	29	30	31	32	33	34	35	36	37	38	39	40	41	42	43	44	45	46	47	48	Wins	Total
(Soviet Union) Anatoly Karpov	2700	½	½	1	½	½	½	½	0	½	½	½	½	½	½	½	½	½	½	½	½	½	½	0	0	5	25
(Soviet Union) Garry Kasparov	2710	½	½	0	½	½	½	½	1	½	½	½	½	½	½	½	½	½	½	½	½	½	½	1	1	3	23

The championship match between Karpov and Kasparov had many ups and downs, and a very controversial finish. Karpov started in very good form, and after nine games Kasparov was down 4–0 in a "first to six wins" match. Fellow players predicted he would be whitewashed 6–0 within 18 games but Kasparov dug in and battled Karpov to 17 successive draws. He lost game 27, then fought back with another series of draws until game 32, his first-ever win against the World Champion. Another 14 successive draws followed, through game 46. The previous record length for a world title match had been 34 games, the 1927 match between José Capablanca and Alexander Alekhine, which also followed the "first to 6 wins" format. Games 47 and 48 were both won by the challenger, making the score 5–3 in favor of Karpov and the eventual outcome far less certain.

The match was ended without result by Florencio Campomanes, the President of the World Chess Federation, and a new match was announced to start a few months later. The termination was controversial, as both players stated that they preferred the match to continue. Announcing his decision at a press conference, Campomanes cited the health of the players, which had been strained by the length of the match (5 months: 10 September 1984 to 8 February 1985).

The restarted match (the World Chess Championship 1985) was best of 24, with the champion (Karpov) to retain his title if the match was tied 12–12. Because Karpov's two-point lead from the 1984 match was wiped out, Karpov was granted the right of a return match (the World Chess Championship 1986) if he lost. The 1984 match became the first, and so far only, world championship match to be abandoned without result. Karpov would later say that, if he had won this match 6-0, Kasparov would never have become world champion, because he was too emotional. On the other hand, Raymond Keene felt that Kasparov showed "an astonishing buoyancy and resilience of spirit".

=== 1985 ===
The match was played as the best of 24 games. If it had ended 12–12, Karpov would have retained his title.

World Chess Championship match, 1985
	Rating	1	2	3	4	5	6	7	8	9	10	11	12	13	14	15	16	17	18	19	20	21	22	23	24	Points
Garry Kasparov (Soviet Union)	2700	1	½	½	0	0	½	½	½	½	½	1	½	½	½	½	1	½	½	1	½	½	0	½	1	13
Anatoly Karpov (Soviet Union)	2720	0	½	½	1	1	½	½	½	½	½	0	½	½	½	½	0	½	½	0	½	½	1	½	0	11

=== 1986 ===
Held in London and Leningrad.

World Chess Championship match, 1986
	Rating	1	2	3	4	5	6	7	8	9	10	11	12	13	14	15	16	17	18	19	20	21	22	23	24	Points
Garry Kasparov (Soviet Union)	2740	½	½	½	1	0	½	½	1	½	½	½	½	½	1	½	1	0	0	0	½	½	1	½	½	12½
Anatoly Karpov (Soviet Union)	2705	½	½	½	0	1	½	½	0	½	½	½	½	½	0	½	0	1	1	1	½	½	0	½	½	11½

=== 1987 ===
The match was played as the best of 24 games. It ended in a 12–12 tie, Kasparov retaining his title.

World Chess Championship Match 1987
	Rating	1	2	3	4	5	6	7	8	9	10	11	12	13	14	15	16	17	18	19	20	21	22	23	24	Points
Garry Kasparov (Soviet Union)	2740	½	0	½	1	0	½	½	1	½	½	1	½	½	½	½	0	½	½	½	½	½	½	0	1	12
Anatoly Karpov (Soviet Union)	2700	½	1	½	0	1	½	½	0	½	½	0	½	½	½	½	1	½	½	½	½	½	½	1	0	12

=== 1990 ===
The first twelve games were played in New York City (8 October – 7 November), the other twelve taking place in Lyon, France (26 November – 30 December).

World Chess Championship Match 1990
	Rating	1	2	3	4	5	6	7	8	9	10	11	12	13	14	15	16	17	18	19	20	21	22	23	24	Total
Anatoly Karpov (Soviet Union)	2730	½	0	½	½	½	½	1	½	½	½	½	½	½	½	½	0	1	0	½	0	½	½	1	½	11½
Garry Kasparov (Russia)	2800	½	1	½	½	½	½	0	½	½	½	½	½	½	½	½	1	0	1	½	1	½	½	0	½	12½

=== Other matches ===
Karpov and Kasparov renewed their rivalry in 2009, holding Rapid and Blitz matches in Valencia. Kasparov got the better of his old rival. The match was set to coincide with the anniversary of their first World Chess Championship meeting.

== Notable games in the rivalry ==
=== 1985 World Chess Championship ===
==== Game 11, Kasparov–Karpov, 1–0 ====
Kasparov–Karpov, game 11, 1985

Position: e8 white rook, a7 black pawn, b7 black bishop, d7 black rook, f7 black pawn, g7 black pawn, h7 black king, b6 black pawn, c6 black knight, f6 black queen, h6 black pawn, e4 white bishop, a3 white pawn, f3 white knight, g3 white pawn, b2 white pawn, f2 white pawn, g2 white pawn, d1 white rook, g1 white king

Final position after 25.Be4+

Game 11 was played with Karpov leading with 2 victories to 1 with the rest of the games drawn. The game started with the Nimzo-Indian. The game was fairly even, with Karpov defending fairly well. The decisive moment came on move 22, where Karpov blundered with 22...Rcd8, which allowed Kasparov to sacrifice his queen, gaining two rooks for a queen, and winning another piece as well, with a mating attack if Black attempts to protect the piece. With the game completely lost, Karpov resigned, equalizing the match at 2 victories apiece with the rest drawn:

1. d4 Nf6 2. c4 e6 3. Nc3 Bb4 4. Nf3 0-0 5. Bg5 c5 6. e3 cxd4 7. exd4 h6 8. Bh4 d5 9. Rc1 dxc4 10. Bxc4 Nc6 11. 0-0 Be7 12. Re1 b6 13. a3 Bb7 14. Bg3 Rc8 15. Ba2 Bd6 16. d5 Nxd5 17. Nxd5 Bxg3 18. hxg3 exd5 19. Bxd5 Qf6 20. Qa4 Rfd8 21. Rcd1 Rd7 22. Qg4 Rcd8 23. Qxd7 Rxd7 24. Re8+ Kh7 25. Be4+ 1–0

Karpov resigned since White is already getting two rooks for the queen after 25...g6 26.Rxd7, and then even more since 26...Ba6 is refuted by 27.Bxc6 Qxc6 28.Rxf7#.

==== Game 16, Karpov–Kasparov, 0–1 ====
Karpov–Kasparov, game 16, 1985

Position: f7 black pawn, g7 black king, h6 black pawn, b4 black pawn, g4 white pawn, b3 white pawn, d3 white rook, g3 white pawn, d2 white knight, f2 black queen, g2 white bishop, h2 white pawn, d1 white knight, e1 black rook, h1 white king

Final position after 40.Re1+

After game 15, the match scores were tied with each contestant having 7½ points. What started as a normal Sicilian Defence in the opening culminated with Kasparov sacrificing a pawn early. He then manoeuvred his pieces around the lost pawn, eventually landing a very powerful knight on d3, completely dominating Karpov's position. Karpov was eventually forced to sacrifice his queen for the knight. Kasparov then successfully transitioned the advantage into a mating attack, infiltrating Karpov's position with his queen and rook and forcing resignation on the 40th move.

1. e4 c5 2. Nf3 e6 3. d4 cxd4 4. Nxd4 Nc6 5. Nb5 d6 6. c4 Nf6 7. N1c3 a6 8. Na3 d5 9. cxd5 exd5 10. exd5 Nb4 11. Be2 Bc5 12. 0-0 0-0 13. Bf3 Bf5 14. Bg5 Re8 15. Qd2 b5 16. Rad1 Nd3 17. Nab1 h6 18. Bh4 b4 19. Na4 Bd6 20. Bg3 Rc8 21. b3 g5 22. Bxd6 Qxd6 23. g3 Nd7 24. Bg2 Qf6 25. a3 a5 26. axb4 axb4 27. Qa2 Bg6 28. d6 g4 29. Qd2 Kg7 30. f3 Qxd6 31. fxg4 Qd4+ 32. Kh1 Nf6 33. Rf4 Ne4 34. Qxd3 Nf2+ 35. Rxf2 Bxd3 36. Rfd2 Qe3 37. Rxd3 Rc1 38. Nb2 Qf2 39. Nd2 Rxd1+ 40. Nxd1 Re1+ (diagram) 0–1
