= Vikram Jayanti =

American documentary filmmaker

Vikram Teja Jayanti is an Indian-American documentary filmmaker responsible for a number of well known full-feature documentary films. Two films he has production credits on have received Academy Awards for Best Full-Feature Documentary: he was a co-producer of the 1997 blockbuster When We Were Kings and a creative consultant on 2005's Born Into Brothels. A sampling of his other work includes Innocents Abroad, The Man Who Bought Mustique, James Ellroy's Feast of Death, Game Over: Kasparov and the Machine, Lincoln and The Agony and the Ecstasy of Phil Spector. He and his films have also won a number of other awards, including the Special Jury Prize at the Sundance Film Festival, and have been nominated for others.

Jayanti is currently a Film Studies tutor at University College London. He is a frequent collaborator with the award-winning film-maker Anthony Wall, Editor of BBC Arena.

== Early life ==
Vikram Jayanti was born in New York in 1955, and spent his childhood variously in France, Italy, Switzerland, India and Costa Rica. He completed his education in England at Tonbridge School and attended the University of Warwick.

== Career ==
After seeing Martin Scorsese's Mean Streets and Werner Herzog's The Enigma of Kaspar Hauser in the same week he moved to Los Angeles in 1977 to become a filmmaker. He began producing anthropological documentaries, including In Her Own Time, about the anthropologist Barbara Myerhoff, and later ran two documentary film festivals in Los Angeles. His future work garnered numerous awards, such as a Special Jury Prize at Sundance and an Oscar in 1997 for When We Were Kings.

Since then he has directed a series of feature documentaries, which his friends call his "American monsters" series, about larger-than-life characters such as Ken Kesey, James Ellroy, Julian Schnabel, Garry Kasparov , Abraham Lincoln and Phil Spector. The Man Who Bought Mustique, which premiered at the Toronto International Film Festival in September 2000, was nominated for a BAFTA, and the UK's Channel Four version of the film won the Indie award for Best Documentary in 2000.

Jayanti is known for "his gonzo choice of subjects," and he "has also produced high-profile television documentaries with his signature combination of eccentricity and amazement."
