= Greengard =

Greengard is a surname. Notable people with the surname include:

- Irene Greengard (1924–2013), American actress and writer under the name Chris Chase
- Leslie Greengard (born 1957), American mathematician
- Michael "Mig" Greengard (born 1969), American chess author and journalist
- Paul Greengard (1925–2019), American molecular neuroscientist, shared the 2000 Nobel Prize for Physiology or Medicine

== See also ==
- Pearl Meister Greengard Prize
