= Game Over: Kasparov and the Machine =

- Theatrical release poster
- Directed by: Vikram Jayanti
- Produced by: Hal Vogel
- Starring: Joel Benjamin; Michael Greengard; Anatoly Karpov; Garry Kasparov; Jeff Kisselhof
- Narrated by: Marc Ghannoum
- Cinematography: Maryse Alberti
- Edited by: David G. Hill
- Music by: Robert Lane
- Production companies: Alliance Atlantis; National Film Board of Canada
- Distributed by: Alliance Atlantis Releasing
- Release dates: September 5, 2003 (TIFF); December 3, 2004 (New York City)
- Running time: 90 minutes
- Country: Canada
- Language: English

Game Over: Kasparov and the Machine is a 2003 Canadian documentary film by Vikram Jayanti about the match between Garry Kasparov, the highest-rated chess player in history (at the time) and the World Champion for 15 years (1985–2000), and Deep Blue, a chess-playing computer created by IBM.

== Synopsis ==
Kasparov had beaten Deep Blue, a computer designed specifically to beat him, in a match played in 1996. He agreed to offer a rematch the following year. Kasparov won the first game of the rematch easily with the white pieces. In the second game, Kasparov was struggling with the black pieces, but he set a trap that most computers fall for. Deep Blue didn't fall for it and won to level the match. At the time, it was reported that both Kasparov and Deep Blue missed a perpetual check that could have given Kasparov a draw, but the strongest computer chess engines today—for example, Stockfish—don't consider the final position as draw but rather as having better winning chances for White, contradicting the human analysis at the time that Kasparov missed an opportunity to enter into a perpetual check. The next three matches ended in draws, with Kasparov appearing to weaken psychologically. Deep Blue went on to win the decisive sixth game, marking the first time in history that a computer defeated the World Champion in a match of several games.

From this experience, particularly the second game of the match, Kasparov accused the IBM team of cheating. He suspected that a human player was used during the games to improve the strategic strength of the computer. As a metaphor for this suspicion, the film weaves in the story of the Turk, a hoax involving a chess-playing automaton built in the eighteenth century, but secretly operated by human beings. The film also implies that Deep Blue's heavily promoted victory was a plot by IBM to boost the company's market value.

== Reception ==
Game Over: Kasparov and the Machine received mixed reviews from critics. Among the positive reviews, Dennis Lim of The Village Voice called Game Over a "gripping documentary". Jami Bernard of the New York Daily News called it "a nail-biter".

Peter Hartlaub of the San Francisco Chronicle, however, called Game Over "a film with one big question and no visible attempt to find any answers." Numerous reviewers criticized Game Over for being biased toward Kasparov and making accusations against IBM without presenting evidence for its claims, including Robert Koehler of Variety, Kevin Crust of the Los Angeles Times, Michael Booth of The Denver Post, Liam Lacey of The Globe and Mail, Janice Page of The Boston Globe, and Ned Martel of The New York Times

The film was nominated for a 2003 International Documentary Association award.

== See also ==
- Behind Deep Blue
