= How Life Imitates Chess =

- Author: Garry Kasparov
- Language: English
- Published: October 2007
- ISBN: 9781596913875

How Life Imitates Chess is a book by former World Chess Champion Garry Kasparov.

Kasparov uses his experience in playing chess successfully as an analogy for how to be successful in real life. He recounts many events from his chess career.

== Reception ==
The book has received mixed reviews from The Guardian and New Humanist, and a positive review by Blas Moros.
