= World Chess Championship 1986 =

Chess match between Garry Kasparov and Anatoly Karpov

	Defending champion	Challenger
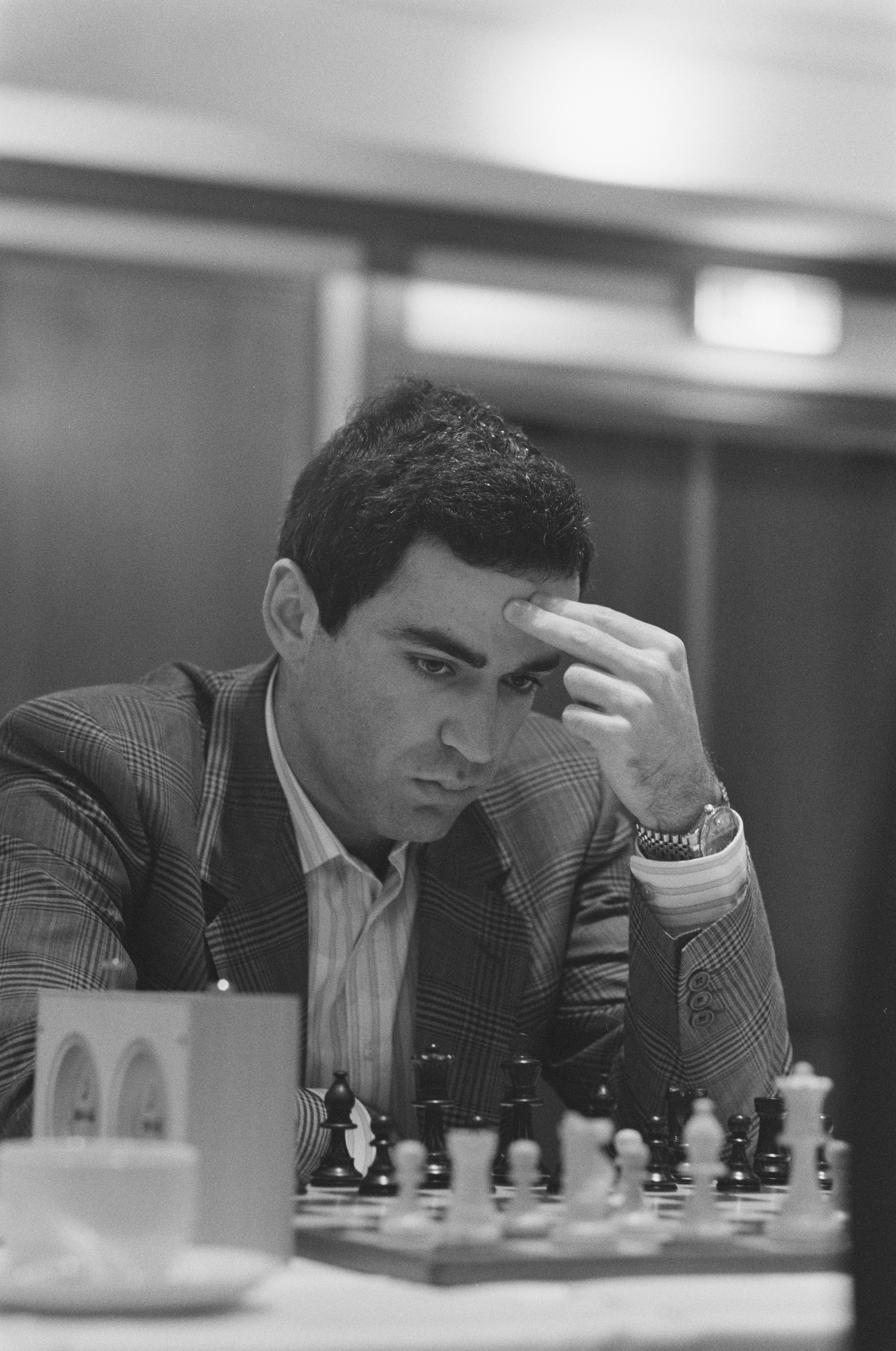
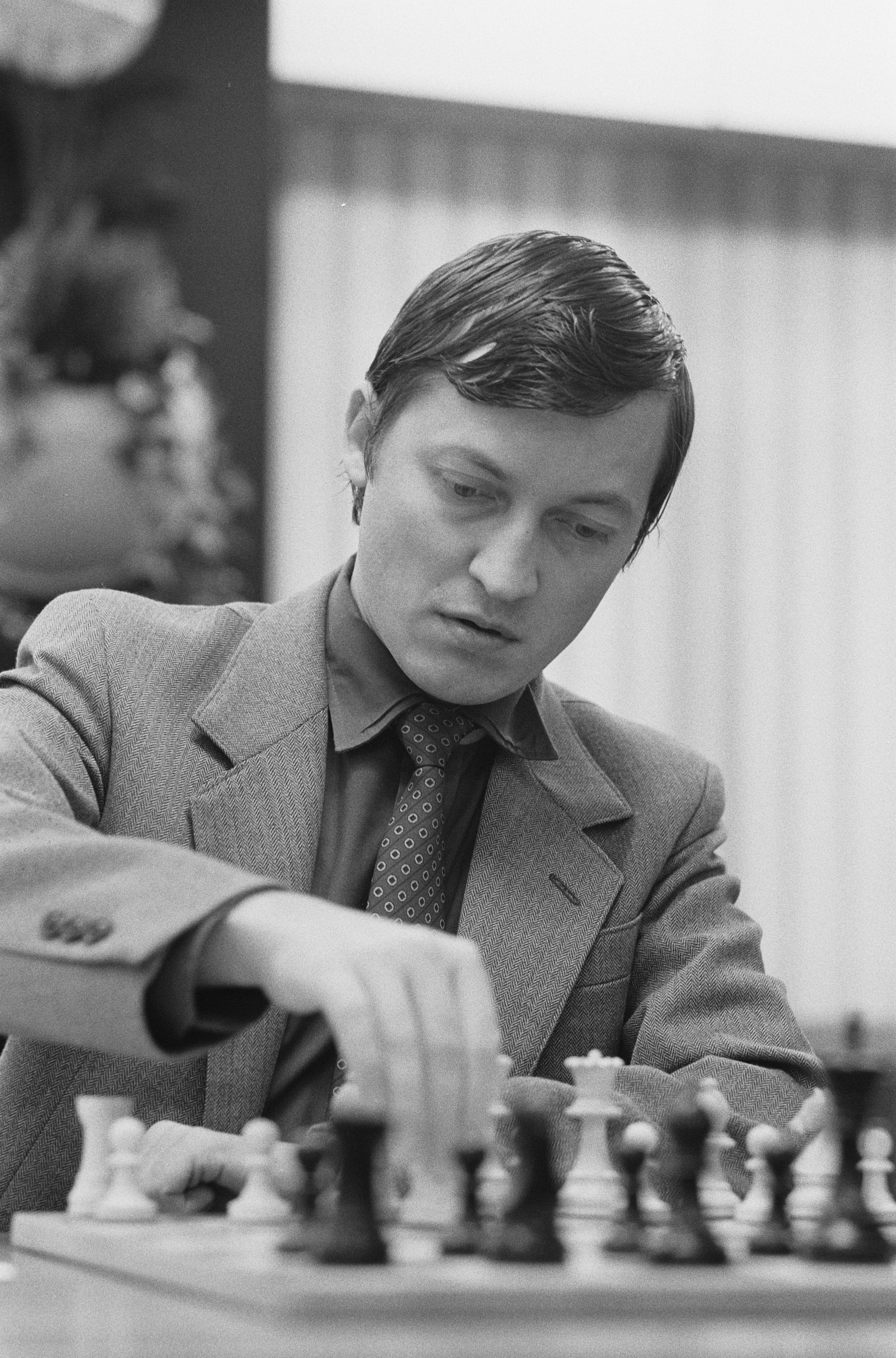
	Garry Kasparov	Anatoly Karpov
	(Soviet Union) Garry Kasparov	(Soviet Union) Anatoly Karpov
12½	Scores	11½
	Born 13 April 1963; 23 years old	Born 23 May 1951; 35 years old
	Winner of the 1985 World Chess Championship	Granted rematch per terms of the 1985 World Chess Championship
	Rating: 2740 (World No. 1)	Rating: 2705 (World No. 2)

The 1986 World Chess Championship was played between Anatoly Karpov and Garry Kasparov in London and Leningrad (Saint Petersburg) from July 28 to October 8, 1986. Games 1-12 were played at the Park Lane Hotel, Piccadilly, London, and games 13–24 at the Hotel Leningrad. Anatoly Karpov was already assured of this rematch during his previous year's match, which was won by Garry Kasparov.

The rematch had been demanded by Florencio Campomanes, President of FIDE, citing a ruling introduced in 1978. Kasparov initially refused and, for the first time, threatened to divide the chess world by seceding from FIDE. However, the match was finally held after an agreement between the two players. Kasparov won with 12.5 to 11.5 points, thus defending his title of World Champion.

This match was the first world championship between two Soviets to take place outside of Moscow. The match would be won by the player who got the best of 24 games. Kasparov taking a lead in game 8 and maintained it until Karpov consecutively won games 17, 18 and 19

== Background ==
Karpov had been world champion since 1975. Kasparov qualified as the challenger in 1984, but their 1984-1985 match was controversially called off after 48 games. The abandoned match was replayed in 1985, and Kasparov won, making him world chess champion. The rules at the time allowed the defeated champion to a rematch (the rematch rule, which had previously been revoked in 1963, had been reinstated in 1978), and FIDE president Florencio Campomanes threatened to relinquish Kasparov's title in favour of Karpov if he did not accept the rematch. Kasparov accused FIDE of favouritism towards Karpov and by extension the Soviet chess establishment.

In an interview with Welt am Sonntag, Kasparov said that he wanted to fight Campomanes for "democracy in world chess." He would only be willing to play an "unnecessary" rematch if the chess world wanted it.

Karpov consistently stated in interviews that he would insist on the match. However, he hinted that the start date set by Campomanes on February 10, 1986, was too early for him as well. The Soviet Chess Federation did not take a clear position; in any case, Kasparov was not prevented from describing the rematch as absurd, even via the Soviet news agency TASS.

Under these circumstances, Campomanes felt in too weak a position to follow through with his announced dismissal of Kasparov for January 7. He postponed his decision to the 16th, then to January 24. Even before this date, however, Kasparov and Karpov had reached an agreement with the approval of the Soviet Chess Federation, but without the participation of FIDE. The World Championship match was not to take place until the end of July or the beginning of August in Leningrad, after a break necessary for both players. The loser would later play a match against the winner of the 1987 Candidates Cycle for the qualification for the 1987 World Chess Championship. Campomanes was then able to ensure that the first half of the match was played in London. According to a FIDE decision, London was the preferred "uninvolved" venue and had offered 1.8 million Swiss francs for the match, while Leningrad had offered only 1 million.

This match was the first world championship between two Soviets to take place outside of Moscow. In London, Kasparov was outspoken against FIDE over the incidents in the preceding year, whose officials he referred to as an "international mafia" on Wogan.

== Results ==
The match was played as the best of 24 games. If it ended 12-12, Kasparov would retain his title. The time control was 40 moves in 2½ hours, and 16 moves per hour thereafter. As was usual at the time, games were adjourned after 5 hours' play.

World Chess Championship Match 1986
	Rating	1	2	3	4	5	6	7	8	9	10	11	12	13	14	15	16	17	18	19	20	21	22	23	24	Points
Garry Kasparov (Soviet Union)	2740	½	½	½	1	0	½	½	1	½	½	½	½	½	1	½	1	0	0	0	½	½	1	½	½	12½
Anatoly Karpov (Soviet Union)	2705	½	½	½	0	1	½	½	0	½	½	½	½	½	0	½	0	1	1	1	½	½	0	½	½	11½

Kasparov led by 3 points after 16 games but Karpov fought back with three straight wins to level the score with five games to go. After two tense draws, Kasparov won the 22nd game and drew the 23rd to clinch the retention of the World Championship. The 24th game was played to determine the distribution of the prize fund. It was drawn so Kasparov received the winner's share of the purse. Had Karpov won, the match would have ended in a tie and the purse would have been equally divided.

== Games ==
=== Game 1: Karpov-Kasparov, 1/2-1/2 ===
Grünfeld Defence (ECO D92)
1.d4 Nf6 2.c4 g6 3.Nc3 d5 4.Nf3 Bg7 5.Bf4 c5 6.dxc5 Qa5 7.Rc1 dxc4 8.e3 Qxc5 9.Qa4+ Nc6 10.Bxc4 O-O 11.O-O Bd7 12.Qb5 Qxb5 13.Bxb5 Rac8 14.Rfd1 Rfd8 15.h3 h6 16.Kf1 a6 17.Be2 Be6 18.Rxd8+ Rxd8 19.Ne5 Nxe5 20.Bxe5 Rd2 21.b3 1/2-1/2

=== Game 2: Kasparov-Karpov, 1/2-1/2 ===
Nimzo-Indian, Three Knights (ECO E21)
1.d4 Nf6 2.c4 e6 3.Nc3 Bb4 4.Nf3 c5 5.g3 Nc6 6.Bg2 d5 7.cxd5 Nxd5 8.Bd2 cxd4 9.Nxd4 Nxd4 10.Nxd5 Bxd2+ 11.Qxd2 Nc6 12.Nf4 Qxd2+ 13.Kxd2 Bd7 14.Rhc1 Ke7 15.Nd3 Rhc8 16.Nc5 Rab8 17.Rc3 Nd8 18.Rac1 Bc6 19.Nd3 Bd7 20.Ne5 Rxc3 21.Rxc3 Be8 22.b4 a6 23.Be4 h6 24.a3 f6 25.Nd3 Bc6 26.Bxc6 Nxc6 27.Nc5 Ne5 28.f4 Nd7 29.Nb3 Kd6 30.e4 g5 31.Ke3 e5 32.fxg5 fxg5 33.Na5 g4 34.Rc2 h5 35.Rc1 b6 36.Rc6+ Ke7 37.Nc4 Rf8 38.Ke2 Rf3 39.Ne3 Nf6 40.Rxb6 Nxe4 41.Rxa6 Rf2+ 42.Kd3 Nd6 43.Ra7+ Ke6 44.Rh7 e4 45.Kc3 Nb5+ 46.Kc4 Nxa3+ 47.Kd4 Rxh2 48.Rh6+ Kd7 49.Nd5 h4 50.Rxh4 Rxh4 51.gxh4 g3 52.Nf4 Nc2+ 1/2-1/2

=== Game 3: Karpov-Kasparov, 1/2-1/2 ===
King's Indian Defense (ECO E60)
1.d4 Nf6 2.c4 g6 3.Nf3 Bg7 4.g3 c6 5.Bg2 d5 6.cxd5 cxd5 7.Nc3 O-O 8.Ne5 e6 9.O-O Nfd7 10.Nf3 Nc6 11.Bf4 Nf6 12.Ne5 Bd7 13.Qd2 Nxe5 14.Bxe5 Bc6 15.Rfd1 Nd7 16.Bxg7 Kxg7 17.Rac1 Nf6 18.Qf4 Qb8 19.Qxb8 Raxb8 20.f3 Rfd8 21.Kf2 Rbc8 22.e3 Ne8 23.Rd2 Nd6 24.Rdc2 Kf8 25.Bf1 Ke7 26.Bd3 f5 27.h4 h6 28.b3 g5 29.Ne2 Bd7 30.Rc5 b6 31.Rc7 Rxc7 32.Rxc7 Ra8 33.Ng1 Ne8 34.Rc1 Rc8 35.Rxc8 1/2-1/2

=== Game 4: Kasparov-Karpov, 1-0 ===
Nimzo-Indian, Three Knights (ECO E21)
1.d4 Nf6 2.c4 e6 3.Nc3 Bb4 4.Nf3 c5 5.g3 cxd4 6.Nxd4 O-O 7.Bg2 d5 8.Qb3 Bxc3+ 9.bxc3 Nc6 10.cxd5 Na5 11.Qc2 Nxd5 12.Qd3 Bd7 13.c4 Ne7 14.O-O Rc8 15.Nb3 Nxc4 16.Bxb7 Rc7 17.Ba6 Ne5 18.Qe3 Nc4 19.Qe4 Nd6 20.Qd3 Rc6 21.Ba3 Bc8 22.Bxc8 Ndxc8 23.Rfd1 Qxd3 24.Rxd3 Re8 25.Rad1 f6 26.Nd4 Rb6 27.Bc5 Ra6 28.Nb5 Rc6 29.Bxe7 Nxe7 30.Rd7 Ng6 31.Rxa7 Nf8 32.a4 Rb8 33.e3 h5 34.Kg2 e5 35.Rd3 Kh7 36.Rc3 Rbc8 37.Rxc6 Rxc6 38.Nc7 Ne6 39.Nd5 Kh6 40.a5 e4 41.a6 1-0

=== Game 5: Karpov-Kasparov, 1-0 ===
Grunfeld (ECO D82)
1.d4 Nf6 2.c4 g6 3.Nc3 d5 4.Bf4 Bg7 5.e3 c5 6.dxc5 Qa5 7.Rc1 Ne4 8.cxd5 Nxc3 9.Qd2 Qxa2 10.bxc3 Qxd2+ 11.Kxd2 Nd7 12.Bb5 O-O 13.Bxd7 Bxd7 14.e4 f5 15.e5 e6 16.c4 Rfc8 17.c6 bxc6 18.d6 c5 19.h4 h6 20.Nh3 a5 21.f3 a4 22.Rhe1 a3 23.Nf2 a2 24.Nd3 Ra3 25.Ra1 g5 26.hxg5 hxg5 27.Bxg5 Kf7 28.Bf4 Rb8 29.Rec1 Bc6 30.Rc3 Ra5 31.Rc2 Rba8 32.Nc1 1-0

=== Game 6: Kasparov-Karpov, 1/2-1/2 ===
Petrov Defense (ECO C42)
1.e4 e5 2.Nf3 Nf6 3.Nxe5 d6 4.Nf3 Nxe4 5.d4 d5 6.Bd3 Nc6 7.O-O Bg4 8.c4 Nf6 9.Nc3 Bxf3 10.Qxf3 Nxd4 11.Qe3+ Ne6 12.cxd5 Nxd5 13.Nxd5 Qxd5 14.Be4 Qb5 15.a4 Qa6 16.Rd1 Be7 17.b4 O-O 18.Qh3 g6 19.Bb2 Qc4 20.Rd7 Rae8 21.Bd5 Qxb4 22.Bc3 Nf4 23.Bxb4 Nxh3+ 24.gxh3 Bxb4 25.Rxc7 b6 26.Rxa7 Kg7 27.Rd7 Rd8 28.Rxd8 Rxd8 29.Rd1 Rd6 30.Rd3 h5 31.Kf1 Rd7 32.Kg2 Bc5 33.Kf1 h4 34.Bc4 Re7 35.Rf3 Bd6 36.Kg2 Rc7 37.Bb3 f5 38.Rd3 Bc5 39.Rc3 Kf6 40.Rc4 g5 41.Rc2 Ke5 42.Bc4 1/2-1/2

=== Game 7: Karpov-Kasparov, 1/2-1/2 ===
Queen's Gambit Declined (ECO D31)
1.d4 d5 2.c4 e6 3.Nc3 Be7 4.cxd5 exd5 5.Bf4 c6 6.Qc2 g6 7.e3 Bf5 8.Qd2 Nd7 9.f3 Nb6 10.e4 Be6 11.e5 h5 12.Bd3 Qd7 13.b3 Bh4+ 14.g3 Be7 15.Kf2 Bf5 16.Bf1 Kf8 17.Kg2 a5 18.a3 Qd8 19.Nh3 Bxh3+ 20.Kxh3 Kg7 21.Kg2 Nd7 22.Bd3 Nf8 23.Be3 Ne6 24.Ne2 Nh6 25.b4 Qb6 26.b5 c5 27.Nc3 cxd4 28.Bxh6+ Rxh6 29.Nxd5 Qd8 30.Be4 h4 31.Rhf1 hxg3 32.hxg3 Rc8 33.Rh1 Rxh1 34.Rxh1 Bg5 35.f4 Rc5 36.fxg5 Rxd5 37.Bxd5 Qxd5+ 38.Kh2 Qxe5 39.Rf1 Qxb5 40.Qf2 Nxg5 41.Qxd4+ Kg8 42.Qd8+ Kg7 43.Qd4+ 1/2-1/2

=== Game 8: Kasparov-Karpov, 1-0 ===
Queen's Gambit Declined (ECO D31)
1.d4 d5 2.c4 e6 3.Nc3 Be7 4.cxd5 exd5 5.Bf4 Nf6 6.e3 O-O 7.Bd3 c5 8.Nf3 Nc6 9.O-O Bg4 10.dxc5 Bxc5 11.h3 Bxf3 12.Qxf3 d4 13.Ne4 Be7 14.Rad1 Qa5 15.Ng3 dxe3 16.fxe3 Qxa2 17.Nf5 Qe6 18.Bh6 Ne8 19.Qh5 g6 20.Qg4 Ne5 21.Qg3 Bf6 22.Bb5 Ng7 23.Bxg7 Bxg7 24.Rd6 Qb3 25.Nxg7 Qxb5 26.Nf5 Rad8 27.Rf6 Rd2 28.Qg5 Qxb2 29.Kh1 Kh8 30.Nd4 Rxd4 31.Qxe5 1-0

=== Game 9: Karpov-Kasparov, 1/2-1/2 ===
Grunfeld (ECO D82)
1.d4 Nf6 2.c4 g6 3.Nc3 d5 4.Bf4 Bg7 5.e3 c5 6.dxc5 Qa5 7.Rc1 dxc4 8.Bxc4 O-O 9.Nf3 Qxc5 10.Bb3 Nc6 11.O-O Qa5 12.h3 Bf5 13.Nd4 Bd7 14.Qe2 Nxd4 15.exd4 e6 16.Bd2 Qb6 17.Rfd1 Bc6 18.Be3 Qa5 19.Bd2 Qb6 20.Be3 Qa5 1/2-1/2

=== Game 10: Kasparov-Karpov, 1/2-1/2 ===
Queen's Gambit Declined (ECO D55)
1.d4 d5 2.c4 e6 3.Nc3 Be7 4.Nf3 Nf6 5.Bg5 h6 6.Bxf6 Bxf6 7.e3 O-O 8.Rc1 c6 9.Bd3 Nd7 10.O-O dxc4 11.Bxc4 e5 12.h3 exd4 13.exd4 c5 14.Bb3 cxd4 15.Nd5 b6 16.Nxd4 Bxd4 17.Qxd4 Nc5 18.Bc4 Bb7 19.Rfd1 Rc8 20.Qg4 Bxd5 21.Rxd5 Qe7 22.Rcd1 Qe4 23.Qxe4 Nxe4 24.Ba6 Nf6 25.Bxc8 Nxd5 26.Ba6 Nf6 27.f4 Re8 28.Kf2 Kf8 29.Kf3 Re7 30.Rd8+ Re8 31.Rxe8+ Nxe8 32.Ke4 Ke7 33.Bc4 Nc7 34.Ke5 f6 35.Kf5 Ne8 36.Ke4 Nc7 37.h4 Kd6 38.Kf5 Ke7 39.Kg6 Kf8 40.Kf5 Ke7 41.Ke4 Kd6 42.g4 Ke7 43.b4 Kd6 1/2-1/2

=== Game 11: Karpov-Kasparov, 1/2-1/2 ===
Grunfeld (ECO D82)
1.d4 Nf6 2.c4 g6 3.Nc3 d5 4.Bf4 Bg7 5.e3 c5 6.dxc5 Qa5 7.Rc1 dxc4 8.Bxc4 O-O 9.Nf3 Qxc5 10.Bb3 Nc6 11.O-O Qa5 12.h3 Bf5 13.Qe2 Ne4 14.Nd5 e5 15.Rxc6 exf4 16.Rc7 Be6 17.Qe1 Qb5 18.Ne7+ Kh8 19.Bxe6 fxe6 20.Qb1 Ng5 21.Nh4 Nxh3+ 22.Kh2 Qh5 23.Nexg6+ hxg6 24.Qxg6 Qe5 25.Rf7 Rxf7 26.Qxf7 Ng5 27.Ng6+ Kh7 28.Nxe5 Nxf7 29.Nxf7 Kg6 30.Nd6 fxe3 31.Nc4 exf2 32.Rxf2 b5 33.Ne3 a5 34.Kg3 a4 35.Rc2 Rf8 36.Kg4 Bd4 37.Re2 Bxe3 38.Rxe3 Rf2 39.b3 Rxg2+ 40.Kf3+ Rxa2 41.bxa4 1/2-1/2

=== Game 12: Kasparov-Karpov, 1/2-1/2 ===
Queen's Gambit Declined (ECO D55)
1.d4 d5 2.c4 e6 3.Nc3 Be7 4.Nf3 Nf6 5.Bg5 h6 6.Bxf6 Bxf6 7.e3 O-O 8.Rc1 c6 9.Bd3 Nd7 10.O-O dxc4 11.Bxc4 c5 12.Qe2 a6 13.Rfd1 cxd4 14.Nxd4 Qe7 15.Ne4 Be5 16.Nf3 Bb8 17.Qd2 b5 18.Be2 Nf6 19.Nxf6+ Qxf6 20.Qd4 Bb7 21.Qxf6 gxf6 22.b3 f5 23.g3 Bxf3 24.Bxf3 Ra7 25.Rc6 Kg7 26.Be2 Be5 27.h3 Bf6 28.Rdd6 Rfa8 29.Kg2 Be7 30.Rd2 b4 31.g4 fxg4 32.hxg4 a5 33.f4 Rd8 34.Rxd8 1/2-1/2

=== Game 13: Karpov-Kasparov, 1/2-1/2 ===
King's Indian Defense (ECO E60)
1.d4 Nf6 2.c4 g6 3.Nf3 Bg7 4.g3 c6 5.Bg2 d5 6.cxd5 cxd5 7.Nc3 O-O 8.Ne5 e6 9.O-O Nfd7 10.f4 f6 11.Nf3 Nc6 12.Be3 Nb6 13.Bf2 f5 14.Ne5 Bd7 15.Qd2 Nc8 16.Qe3 Kh8 17.Rfd1 Nd6 18.b3 Rc8 19.Rac1 Be8 20.Be1 Bf6 21.Na4 b6 22.Nb2 Ne4 23.Nbd3 g5 24.Nxc6 Bxc6 25.Ne5 gxf4 26.gxf4 Be8 27.Qh3 Rg8 28.Kf1 Rxc1 29.Rxc1 h5 30.Bb4 a5 31.Ba3 Bxe5 32.dxe5 Rg4 33.Bxe4 dxe4 34.Bd6 Rxf4+ 35.Ke1 Rg4 36.Qe3 Qg5 37.Qxg5 Rxg5 38.Rc8 Rg8 39.e3 h4 40.h3 a4 1/2-1/2

=== Game 14: Kasparov-Karpov, 1-0 ===
Ruy Lopez, Closed (ECO C92)
1.e4 e5 2.Nf3 Nc6 3.Bb5 a6 4.Ba4 Nf6 5.O-O Be7 6.Re1 b5 7.Bb3 d6 8.c3 O-O 9.h3 Bb7 10.d4 Re8 11.Nbd2 Bf8 12.a4 h6 13.Bc2 exd4 14.cxd4 Nb4 15.Bb1 c5 16.d5 Nd7 17.Ra3 c4 18.axb5 axb5 19.Nd4 Rxa3 20.bxa3 Nd3 21.Bxd3 cxd3 22.Bb2 Qa5 23.Nf5 Ne5 24.Bxe5 dxe5 25.Nb3 Qb6 26.Qxd3 Ra8 27.Rc1 g6 28.Ne3 Bxa3 29.Ra1 Ra4 30.Ng4 Bf8 31.Rc1 Qd6 32.Nc5 Rc4 33.Rxc4 bxc4 34.Nxb7 cxd3 35.Nxd6 Bxd6 36.Kf1 Kg7 37.f3 f5 38.Nf2 d2 39.Ke2 Bb4 40.Nd3 Bc3 41.Nc5 Kf6 42.Nb3 Ke7 43.Nxd2 Kd6 44.Kd3 Bb4 45.Nb3 Be1 46.Kc4 Bf2 47.Kb5 Be3 48.Na5 1-0

=== Game 15: Karpov-Kasparov, 1/2-1/2 ===
Grunfeld, Russian (ECO D98)
1.d4 Nf6 2.c4 g6 3.Nc3 d5 4.Nf3 Bg7 5.Qb3 dxc4 6.Qxc4 O-O 7.e4 Bg4 8.Be3 Nfd7 9.Rd1 Nc6 10.Be2 Nb6 11.Qc5 Qd6 12.e5 Qxc5 13.dxc5 Nc8 14.Nb5 Rb8 15.Nxc7 e6 16.Nb5 N8e7 17.Rd2 b6 18.cxb6 axb6 19.Bg5 Nf5 20.b3 h6 21.Bf6 Bxf3 22.Bxf3 Nxe5 23.Bxe5 Bxe5 24.O-O Rfd8 25.Rfd1 Rxd2 26.Rxd2 Rc8 27.g3 Rc1+ 28.Kg2 Kf8 29.Be4 Ke7 1/2-1/2

=== Game 16: Kasparov-Karpov, 1-0 ===
Ruy Lopez, Closed (ECO C92)
1.e4 e5 2.Nf3 Nc6 3.Bb5 a6 4.Ba4 Nf6 5.O-O Be7 6.Re1 b5 7.Bb3 d6 8.c3 O-O 9.h3 Bb7 10.d4 Re8 11.Nbd2 Bf8 12.a4 h6 13.Bc2 exd4 14.cxd4 Nb4 15.Bb1 c5 16.d5 Nd7 17.Ra3 c4 18.Nd4 Qf6 19.N2f3 Nc5 20.axb5 axb5 21.Nxb5 Rxa3 22.Nxa3 Ba6 23.Re3 Rb8 24.e5 dxe5 25.Nxe5 Nbd3 26.Ng4 Qb6 27.Rg3 g6 28.Bxh6 Qxb2 29.Qf3 Nd7 30.Bxf8 Kxf8 31.Kh2 Rb3 32.Bxd3 cxd3 33.Qf4 Qxa3 34.Nh6 Qe7 35.Rxg6 Qe5 36.Rg8+ Ke7 37.d6+ Ke6 38.Re8+ Kd5 39.Rxe5+ Nxe5 40.d7 Rb8 41.Nxf7 1-0

=== Game 17: Karpov-Kasparov, 1-0 ===
Grunfeld, Russian (ECO D98)
1.d4 Nf6 2.c4 g6 3.Nc3 d5 4.Nf3 Bg7 5.Qb3 dxc4 6.Qxc4 O-O 7.e4 Bg4 8.Be3 Nfd7 9.Rd1 Nc6 10.Be2 Nb6 11.Qc5 Qd6 12.e5 Qxc5 13.dxc5 Nc8 14.h3 Bxf3 15.Bxf3 Bxe5 16.Bxc6 bxc6 17.Bd4 Bf4 18.O-O a5 19.Rfe1 a4 20.Re4 Bh6 21.Be5 a3 22.b3 Na7 23.Rd7 Bc1 24.Rxc7 Bb2 25.Na4 Nb5 26.Rxc6 Rfd8 27.Rb6 Rd5 28.Bg3 Nc3 29.Nxc3 Bxc3 30.c6 Bd4 31.Rb7 1-0

=== Game 18: Kasparov-Karpov, 0-1 ===
Queen's Indian (ECO E12)
1.d4 Nf6 2.c4 e6 3.Nf3 b6 4.Nc3 Bb4 5.Bg5 Bb7 6.e3 h6 7.Bh4 Bxc3+ 8.bxc3 d6 9.Nd2 g5 10.Bg3 Qe7 11.a4 a5 12.h4 Rg8 13.hxg5 hxg5 14.Qb3 Na6 15.Rb1 Kf8 16.Qd1 Bc6 17.Rh2 Kg7 18.c5 bxc5 19.Bb5 Nb8 20.dxc5 d5 21.Be5 Kf8 22.Rh6 Ne8 23.Qh5 f6 24.Rh7 Ng7 25.Qf3 Kf7 26.Qh5+ Kf8 27.Qf3 Kf7 28.Rh6 Ne8 29.e4 g4 30.Qf4 Bxb5 31.Rxb5 Nd7 32.Bxc7 Nxc5 33.Qe3 Nxe4 34.Nxe4 dxe4 35.Bxa5 f5 36.Bb4 Qd7 37.Qd4 Ra7 38.Rh7+ Ng7 39.a5 Kg6 40.Qxd7 Rxd7 41.Rh4 Rgd8 42.c4 Rd1+ 43.Ke2 Rc1 44.a6 Rc2+ 45.Ke1 Ra2 46.Rb6 Rd3 47.c5 Ra1+ 48.Ke2 Ra2+ 49.Ke1 g3 50.fxg3 Rxg3 51.Kf1 Rgxg2 52.Be1 Rgc2 53.c6 Ra1 54.Rh3 f4 55.Rb4 Kf5 56.Rb5+ e5 57.Ra5 Rd1 58.a7 e3 0-1

=== Game 19: Karpov-Kasparov, 1-0 ===
Grunfeld, Russian (ECO D97)
1.d4 Nf6 2.c4 g6 3.Nc3 d5 4.Nf3 Bg7 5.Qb3 dxc4 6.Qxc4 O-O 7.e4 Na6 8.Be2 c5 9.d5 e6 10.O-O exd5 11.exd5 Bf5 12.Bf4 Re8 13.Rad1 Ne4 14.Nb5 Qf6 15.Bd3 Nb4 16.Nc7 Nxd3 17.Nxe8 Rxe8 18.Qxd3 Qxb2 19.Rde1 Qb4 20.Nd2 Qa4 21.Qc4 Qxc4 22.Nxc4 Bc3 23.Nd2 Bxd2 24.Bxd2 Bd7 25.Bf4 Bb5 26.f3 g5 27.Bxg5 Bxf1 28.Kxf1 Nd6 29.Be7 Nc8 30.Bxc5 Rd8 31.Re5 f6 32.Rf5 b6 33.Bd4 Ne7 34.Bxf6 Rxd5 35.Rg5+ Rxg5 36.Bxg5 Nc6 37.Ke2 Kf7 38.Kd3 Ke6 39.Kc4 Ne5+ 40.Kd4 Nc6+ 41.Kc4 1-0

=== Game 20: Kasparov-Karpov, 1/2-1/2 ===
Catalan, Closed (ECO E06)
1.d4 Nf6 2.c4 e6 3.g3 d5 4.Bg2 Be7 5.Nf3 O-O 6.O-O dxc4 7.Qc2 a6 8.Qxc4 b5 9.Qc2 Bb7 10.Bg5 Nbd7 11.Bxf6 Nxf6 12.Nbd2 Rc8 13.Nb3 c5 14.dxc5 Bd5 15.Rfd1 Bxb3 16.Qxb3 Qc7 17.a4 Qxc5 18.axb5 axb5 19.Nd4 b4 20.e3 Rfd8 21.Rd2 Qb6 1/2-1/2

=== Game 21: Karpov-Kasparov, 1/2-1/2 ===
Queen's Indian (ECO E15)
1.d4 Nf6 2.c4 e6 3.Nf3 b6 4.g3 Ba6 5.b3 Bb4+ 6.Bd2 Be7 7.Bg2 O-O 8.O-O d5 9.Ne5 c6 10.Bc3 Nfd7 11.Nxd7 Nxd7 12.Nd2 Rc8 13.e4 dxc4 14.bxc4 b5 15.Re1 bxc4 16.Qc2 Qc7 17.Nf1 e5 18.Ne3 exd4 19.Bxd4 Bc5 20.Bxc5 Nxc5 21.Nxc4 Rfd8 22.Rad1 Rxd1 23.Rxd1 Rd8 24.Rxd8+ Qxd8 25.h4 Qd4 26.Qb2 Qxb2 27.Nxb2 f6 28.f3 Kf7 29.Bf1 Bb5 30.Kf2 Ke6 31.Bc4+ Kd6 32.Ke3 Nd7 33.f4 Nb6 34.Bg8 h6 35.Nd3 Nd7 36.Kd4 c5 37.Kc3 Bc6 38.Nf2 Nb6 39.Bb3 Na8 40.Kd3 Nb6 41.Bc2 Bb5+ 42.Kc3 Na4+ 43.Kd2 c4 44.e5+ fxe5 45.Ne4+ Ke6 46.Bxa4 Bxa4 47.Nc5+ Kf5 48.Nxa4 exf4 49.gxf4 Kxf4 1/2-1/2

=== Game 22: Kasparov-Karpov, 1-0 ===
Queen's Gambit Declined (ECO D55)
1.d4 Nf6 2.c4 e6 3.Nf3 d5 4.Nc3 Be7 5.Bg5 h6 6.Bxf6 Bxf6 7.e3 O-O 8.Rc1 c6 9.Bd3 Nd7 10.O-O dxc4 11.Bxc4 e5 12.h3 exd4 13.exd4 Nb6 14.Bb3 Bf5 15.Re1 a5 16.a3 Re8 17.Rxe8+ Qxe8 18.Qd2 Nd7 19.Qf4 Bg6 20.h4 Qd8 21.Na4 h5 22.Re1 b5 23.Nc3 Qb8 24.Qe3 b4 25.Ne4 bxa3 26.Nxf6+ Nxf6 27.bxa3 Nd5 28.Bxd5 cxd5 29.Ne5 Qd8 30.Qf3 Ra6 31.Rc1 Kh7 32.Qh3 Rb6 33.Rc8 Qd6 34.Qg3 a4 35.Ra8 Qe6 36.Rxa4 Qf5 37.Ra7 Rb1+ 38.Kh2 Rc1 39.Rb7 Rc2 40.f3 Rd2 41.Nd7 Rxd4 42.Nf8+ Kh6 43.Rb4 Rc4 44.Rxc4 dxc4 45.Qd6 c3 46.Qd4 1-0

=== Game 23: Karpov-Kasparov, 1/2-1/2 ===
English (ECO A15)
1.Nf3 Nf6 2.c4 b6 3.g3 c5 4.Bg2 Bb7 5.O-O g6 6.d4 cxd4 7.Qxd4 Bg7 8.Nc3 d6 9.Rd1 Nbd7 10.b3 Rc8 11.Bb2 O-O 12.Qe3 Re8 13.Rac1 a6 14.Ba1 Rc5 15.a4 Qa8 16.Ne1 Rf5 17.Bxb7 Qxb7 18.f3 h5 19.Ng2 Rc5 20.Bb2 Rcc8 21.Ba3 Nc5 22.Rb1 Ne6 23.Qd3 Nc7 24.Nf4 b5 25.cxb5 axb5 26.Nxb5 Nxb5 27.Qxb5 Qxb5 28.axb5 Rb8 29.Bb2 Rb7 30.b6 Reb8 31.b4 Nd7 32.Bxg7 Kxg7 33.Nd5 Nxb6 34.Nxb6 Rxb6 35.Rd4 e5 36.Rd5 Rxb4 37.Rxb4 Rxb4 38.Rxd6 1/2-1/2

=== Game 24: Kasparov-Karpov, 1/2-1/2 ===
Queen's Indian (ECO E16)
1.d4 Nf6 2.c4 e6 3.Nf3 b6 4.g3 Bb7 5.Bg2 Bb4+ 6.Bd2 a5 7.O-O O-O 8.Bg5 Be7 9.Qc2 h6 10.Bxf6 Bxf6 11.Nc3 g6 12.Rad1 d6 13.h4 h5 14.e4 Nd7 15.e5 Bg7 16.d5 Nxe5 17.Nxe5 Bxe5 18.dxe6 Bxg2 19.exf7 Kxf7 20.Kxg2 Bxc3 21.Qxc3 Qf6 22.Qxf6+ Kxf6 23.a4 Rae8 24.Rfe1 Rxe1 25.Rxe1 Rd8 26.Rd1 c6 27.Kf3 Ke5 28.Ke3 Rf8 29.f3 Rh8 30.Re1 Rb8 31.Kd3 Kf6 32.Re4 d5 33.cxd5 cxd5 34.Re2 b5 35.Kd4 bxa4 36.Kxd5 Rb3 37.Ke4 Rb4+ 38.Kd5 Rb5+ 39.Kd4 Rb4+ 40.Kd5 Rb3 41.Ke4 1/2-1/2
