= Kasparov Chessmate =

2003 video game

- Developer: The Learning Company
- Publisher: Jamdat Mobile
- Platforms: Microsoft Windows, Mac OS, Palm OS
- Release: 2003
- Genre: Computer chess
- Modes: Single player, multiplayer

Kasparov Chessmate is a chess-playing computer program by The Learning Company for which Garry Kasparov is co-credited as game designer. Kasparov also makes an appearance as the last computer profile which has to be defeated in order to win the "Kasparov Chess Club" tournament.

== Gameplay ==
The program has two basic single-player modes. The first allows a player to set up the board, time and difficulty level for a single game and allows for undoing mistakes. The second, the "Kasparov Chess Club", sets up a series of opponents of increasing skill, all of which have to be defeated in order to win. The game also allows for playing human opponents locally.

Unlike the Chessmaster series, it has no real training or tutorial section. It does however feature the option to synchronise the PC version with the Palm version, so the player's rating and progress in the tournament can be preserved across platforms.

The game was ported to in-flight entertainment platforms by DTI Software.
