= Professional Chess Association =

International chess body (1993–1996)

The Professional Chess Association (PCA), which existed between 1993 and 1996, was a rival organisation to FIDE, the International Chess Federation. The PCA was created in 1993 by Garry Kasparov and Nigel Short for the marketing and organization of their Chess World Championship.

== Formation ==
In 1993, Nigel Short won the Candidates Tournament and so qualified as challenger to Garry Kasparov for the World Chess Championship.

By FIDE regulation, the bids for where the World Championship final is played should have been decided by three parties – FIDE, the World Champion (Kasparov) and the Challenger (Short). According to Kasparov and Short, FIDE president Florencio Campomanes broke these rules by simply announcing the venue of the winning bid as being Manchester. FIDE derived a substantial part of its income from the prize fund of the World Championship.

In response to this, Kasparov and Short formed the PCA, appointing Bob Rice as Commissioner. They played their world championship match under its auspices in September and October 1993. The match took place in the Savoy Theatre in London, under the sponsorship of The Times. Kasparov won clearly 12.5–7.5 and became PCA World Chess Champion.

FIDE stripped Kasparov of the FIDE World Championship title, and instead held a rival match between Anatoly Karpov and Jan Timman, the two final players Short had defeated to win the Candidates Tournament. Karpov won that match, to become FIDE World Chess Champion. For the first time in chess history there were two world champions, the FIDE world champion Karpov and the PCA world champion Kasparov.

== 1995 cycle ==
From 1993 to 1995, the PCA held an Interzonal tournament and Candidates matches, in the style of the FIDE world championship qualifiers. FIDE also had its own cycle of qualifiers, with many of the same players playing in both. The PCA candidates cycle was won by the Indian GM Viswanathan Anand.

Kasparov defended his PCA World Championship title against Anand in the World Trade Center in a match starting September 11, 1995. Kasparov won the best-of-20 game match 10.5 – 7.5.

== Demise and aftermath ==
The PCA announced in January 1996 that it had lost its main sponsor, Intel. It was reported at the time that Kasparov said this was partly due to his choice to play a match against IBM's supercomputer Deep Blue later that year. Kasparov, however, hotly disputes this and has proposed a different history, with Intel dropping sponsorship in November 1995, some weeks prior to the initial planning of the Deep Blue match.

The PCA folded soon afterwards, leaving Kasparov unable to organise a proper qualifying cycle for his title. It was succeeded by the World Chess Council, which organized a Candidates match between Vladimir Kramnik and Alexei Shirov in 1998, with the intention that the winner would be Kasparov's next challenger. The match was won by Shirov, but when the World Chess Council also folded, Kasparov played Kramnik in the Classical World Chess Championship 2000, under the auspices of the short-lived company BrainGames.

Kramnik won the 2000 match, and when he defended his title at the Classical World Chess Championship 2004, he gave the title the name "Classical", to emphasise the continuity that his title had with the tradition of defeating the previous titleholder. Since this is the same title as Kasparov's PCA World title, the PCA World title is sometimes retrospectively called the "Classical" title.

The PCA split from FIDE was finally healed with the FIDE World Chess Championship 2006, a re-unification match between Kramnik and 2005 FIDE World Champion Veselin Topalov, which was won by Kramnik.

== See also ==
- Association of Chess Professionals
