= Florencio Campomanes =

Filipino chess organizer and player (1927–2010)

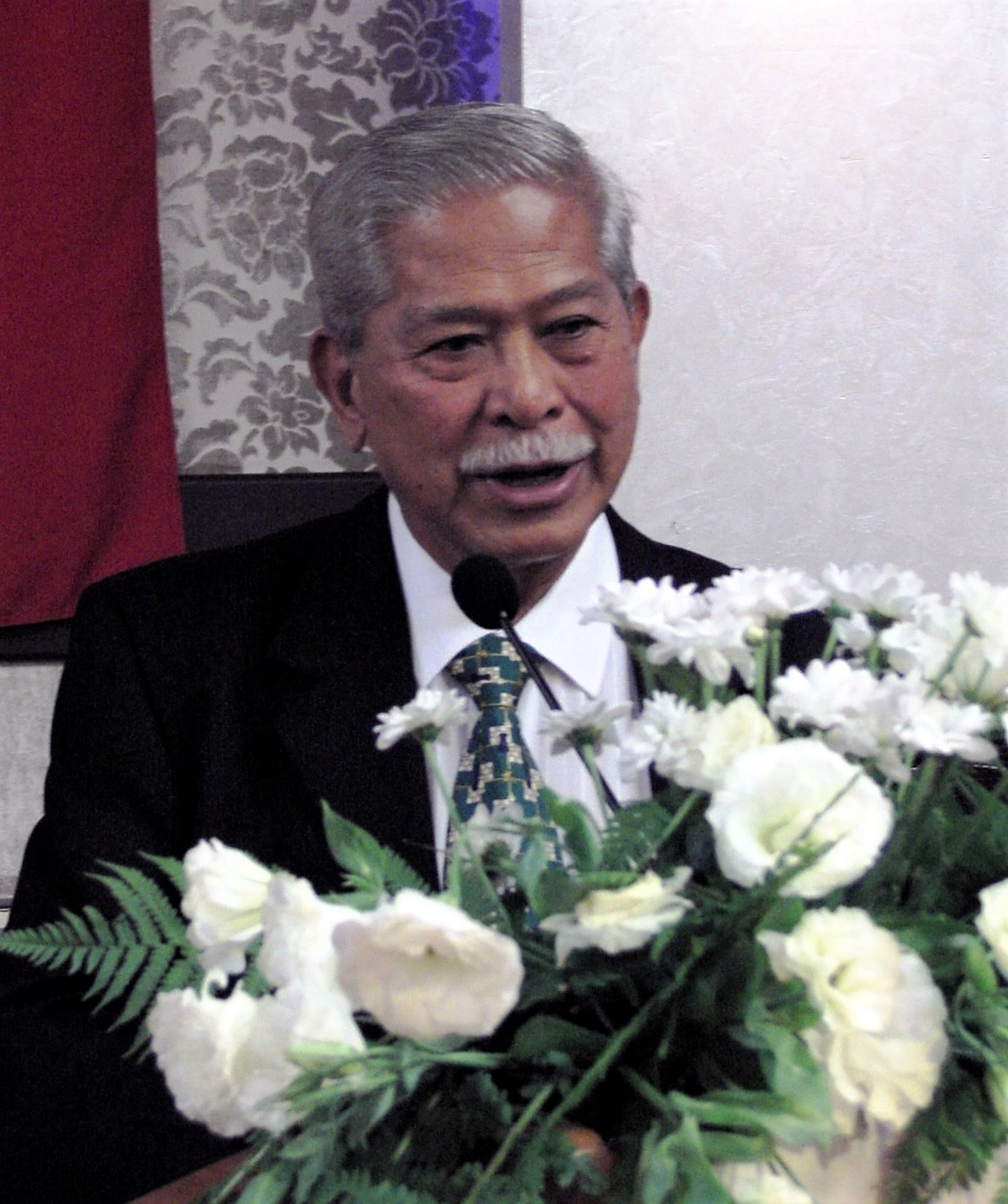
- Campomanes in 2008

President of FIDE
- In office 1982–1995
- Preceded by: Friðrik Ólafsson
- Succeeded by: Kirsan Ilyumzhinov

Personal details
- Born: February 22, 1927 Manila, Philippines
- Died: March 5, 2010 (aged 83) Baguio, Philippines

Florencio Campomanes (22 February 1927 – 3 May 2010) was a Filipino chess organizer and player.

== Education ==
Campomanes was born in Manila and earned his B.A. in political science from the University of the Philippines in 1948. Then, he studied at Brown University (Providence, Rhode Island), where he earned his M.A. in 1951. He undertook doctoral studies at Georgetown University, Washington, D.C., from 1949 to 1954.

== Chess career as a player ==
While he never got close to becoming a Grandmaster or International Master, Campomanes was nevertheless a National Master strength player during his peak years, and was Philippine national champion on two occasions (1956, 1960). In 1950's-60's, he represented his country at five Chess Olympiads: Moscow 1956, Munich 1958, Leipzig 1960, Varna 1962, and Havana 1966. He met some distinguished opposition as a result, losing games against Pal Benko and Ludek Pachman at Moscow 1956, Oscar Panno at Munich 1958, Mikhail Tal and Miguel Najdorf at Leipzig 1960, and Lev Polugaevsky at Havana 1966.

== Involvement with FIDE ==
Campomanes became involved in FIDE as a national delegate, and worked his way into prominence in Asian chess organization. Campomanes often boasted that he was close to the former Philippine dictator Ferdinand Marcos. Campomanes helped organize the World Chess Championship match held in 1978 at Baguio, Philippines, between Anatoly Karpov and Viktor Korchnoi.

Campomanes is best remembered as the President of FIDE, to which post he was elected in 1982, and held until 1995, through several controversies, most notably the abandonment of the 1984–85 match between Karpov and Garry Kasparov without result, after 48 games, and the break-away from FIDE of the Professional Chess Association in 1993.

The membership of FIDE grew by about fifty member nations during his tenure as president. Campomanes was succeeded in 1995 by Kirsan Ilyumzhinov. He was appointed FIDE Honorary President, and was often present at significant international competitions such as zonal and continental championships, chess olympiads, and world chess championships.

Campomanes remains the only Asian to ever hold the presidency of FIDE, which is based in Lausanne, Switzerland. Campomanes is also the only non-European FIDE president after Augusto de Muro.

== Accused KGB asset ==
According to the book The KGB Plays Chess (Boris Gulko, Korchnoi, Vladimir Popow and Yuri Felshtinsky), Campomanes, then Vice-President of FIDE, was recruited as an asset by the KGB in exchange for Soviet support for his candidacy as FIDE President. As FIDE President, Campomanes was accused of helping Karpov retain the world title at all costs. "At the same time USSR Chess Federation President, Vitaly Sevastianov turned to Campomanes. With the signature of deputy chairman of the KGB Philipp Bobkov a proposal was finally sent to the Central Committee of the Communist Party of the Soviet Union to terminate the match and start again with a 0-0 score. The intention was to avoid the impression that the decision favoured Karpov. But mainly people did not want to displease Kasparov's powerful patron Gaidar Alijev. The Central Committee supported the proposal of the KGB and Campomanes terminated the match." More commonly known is the quote following the press conference which terminated the match, overheard by ESPN microphones, reported in Chess Life by witness Maxim Dlugy and Sports Illustrated: "But Anatoly, I told them just what you said".

US Grandmaster Andy Soltis said it was "absurd" to suggest that Campomones was a KGB agent, but thought that his decisions in the match favored Karpov.

== Charges of fraud ==
On 5 February 2003, the Philippine anti-graft court Sandiganbayan convicted Campomanes for failure to account for the Philippine Sports Commission (PSC) government funds amounting to PhP12.876 million (or US$238,746 at an exchange rate of PhP53.932 = $1). The PSC entrusted these funds to the FIDE for the World Chess Olympiad in Manila, hosted by the Philippine government from 6 to 25 June 1992. Subsequently, Florencio Campomanes was sentenced to one year and 10 months imprisonment, later reduced to a PhP6000 fine in December 2006.

The charges against Campomanes were overturned based upon a technicality. There was never any resolution as to the disposition of the 12.876 million pesos mentioned above. The rationale for the reversal was that the Supreme Court of the Philippines decided that Campomanes was not a government official to whom the anti-graft laws applied. Thus as a non-government official, Campomanes had no duty under the law to render an accounting of the missing funds.

== Injury and death ==
In early February 2007, Florencio Campomanes suffered injuries from a car accident in Antalya, Turkey which resulted in time in an intensive care unit.

On 3 May 2010, Campomanes died in the Philippines.

== Curriculum vitae of Florencio B. Campomanes ==
- M. A., Brown University, Providence, Rhode Island, 1951
- Doctoral Studies, Georgetown University, Washington, D.C., 1949–1952
- Fulbright Grantee, 1948
- Lecturer, (Political Science) University of the Philippines, 1954–1956
- Founding Member, U.P. Beta Sigma Fraternity, 1946
- Chess columnist, Manila Times and Manila Chronicle, 1954–1961
- TV producer – Host, Chess Today, GTV/MBS-4 Manila, 1974–1982
- Permanent Philippines Delegate to FIDE, 1956–1982
- FIDE Asian Zone President, 1960–1964
- FIDE Deputy President for Asia, 1974–1982
- FIDE President, 1982–1995
- FIDE Chairman, 1995–1996
- FIDE Honorary President 1996–2010
- Philippine Champion, 1956, 1960
- Tied 2nd–3rd with Edmar Mednis, New York State Championship, 1954
- International Arbiter, 1957
- Philippine Olympiad Team Member and/or Captain: Moscow 1956–Board 2, Munich 1958–Board 3, Leipzig 1960–Board 1, Tel Aviv 1964–Board 4, Havana 1966–Board 4
- Captain: Lugano 1968, Siegen 1970, Skopje 1972, Nice 1974, Haifa 1976, Buenos Aires 1978, Valletta 1980
- Administered under FIDE: Olympiad – Thessaloniki 1984, Thessaloniki 1988
- Dubai 1986, Novi Sad 1990, Moscow 1994
- Organized for the Philippines, Manila 1992
- World Championship, 1978
- Interzonals, 1976, 1990
- World Juniors 1974, 1987
- First Asian Zonal, 1958
- First Asian Junior Championship, 1977
- Raised FIDE Membership from 100's to 150's
- Raised US $13,000,000 for six Men's World Championship matches in nine years: Moscow 1984 and 1985, London & Leningrad 1986
