= Garry Kasparov =

Russian chess grandmaster (born 1963)

Garry Kasparov Гарри Каспаров
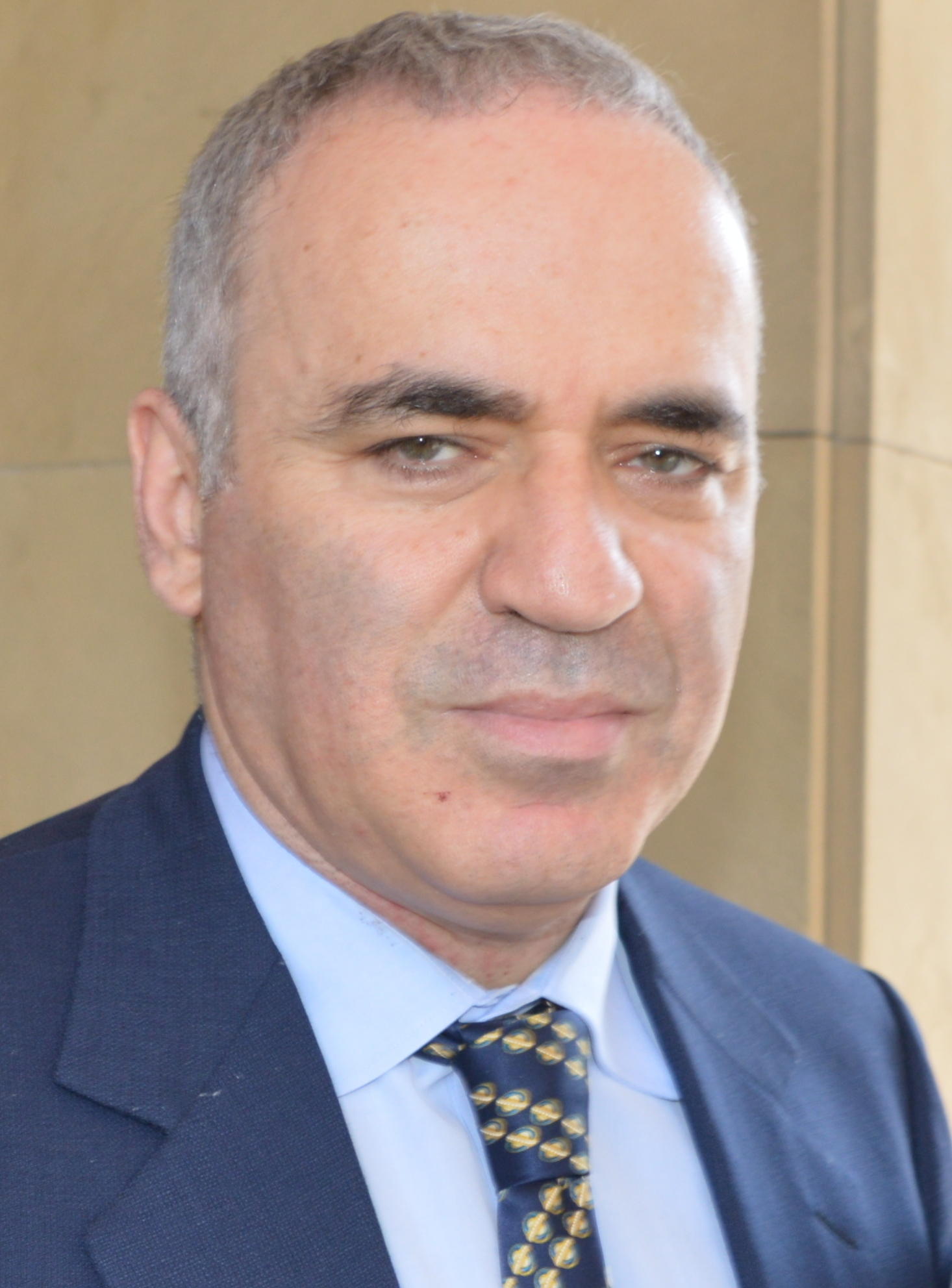
- Kasparov in 2015

Personal information
- Full name: Garry Kimovich Kasparov
- Born: Garik Kimovich Weinstein; 13 April 1963 (age 63) Baku, Azerbaijan SSR, Soviet Union

Chess career
- Country: Soviet Union (until 1991); Russia (since 1991)
- Title: Grandmaster (1980)
- World Champion: 1985–1993 (undisputed); 1993–2000 (classical)
- Years active: 1976–2005
- FIDE rating: 2812 (November 2026)
- Peak rating: 2851 (July 1999)
- Peak ranking: No. 1 (January 1984)
- Kasparov's voice (in Russian) from Kasparov's interview for Echo of Moscow, 13 September 2011

Garry Kimovich Kasparov (Note: Russian: Гарри Кимович Каспаров, pronounced [ˈɡarʲɪ ˈkʲiməvʲɪtɕ kɐˈsparəf]) (born Garik Kimovich Weinstein (Note: Russian: Гарик Кимович Вайнштейн, romanized: Garik Kimovich Vainshteyn) on 13 April 1963) is a Russian chess grandmaster, political activist and writer, who was the World Chess Champion from 1985 to 2000. His peak FIDE chess rating of 2851, achieved in 1999, was the highest recorded until being surpassed by Magnus Carlsen in 2013. From 1984 until his retirement from regular competitive chess in 2005, Kasparov was ranked the world's No. 1 player for a record 255 months overall. Kasparov also holds records for the most consecutive professional tournament victories (15) and Chess Oscars (11).

Kasparov became the youngest undisputed world champion in 1985 at age 22 by defeating then-champion Anatoly Karpov, a record he held until 2024. He defended the title against Karpov three times, in 1986, 1987 and 1990. Kasparov held the official FIDE world title until 1993, when a dispute with FIDE led him to set up a rival organisation, the Professional Chess Association. In 1997, he became the first world champion to lose a match to a computer under standard time controls when he was defeated by the IBM supercomputer Deep Blue in a highly publicised match. He continued to hold the "Classical" world title until his defeat by Vladimir Kramnik in 2000. Despite losing the PCA title, he continued winning tournaments and was the world's highest-rated player at the time of his official retirement. Kasparov coached Carlsen in 2009–2010, during which time Carlsen rose to world No. 1. Kasparov stood unsuccessfully for FIDE president in 2013–2014.

Since retiring from chess, Kasparov has devoted his time to writing and politics. His book series My Great Predecessors, first published in 2003, details the history and games of the world champion chess players who preceded him. He formed the United Civil Front movement and was a member of The Other Russia, a coalition opposing the administration and policies of Vladimir Putin. In 2008, he announced an intention to run as a candidate in that year's Russian presidential race, but after encountering logistical problems in his campaign, for which he blamed "official obstruction", he withdrew. Following the Russian mass protests that began in 2011, he announced in June 2013 that he had left Russia for the immediate future out of fear of persecution. Following his flight from Russia, he lived in New York City with his family. In 2014, he obtained Croatian citizenship and has maintained a residence in Podstrana near Split. Russia designated him as "foreign agent" in 2022.

Kasparov was chairman of the Human Rights Foundation from 2011 to 2024. In 2017, he founded the Renew Democracy Initiative (RDI), an American political organisation promoting and defending liberal democracy in the US and abroad. He serves as chairman of the group.

== Early life ==
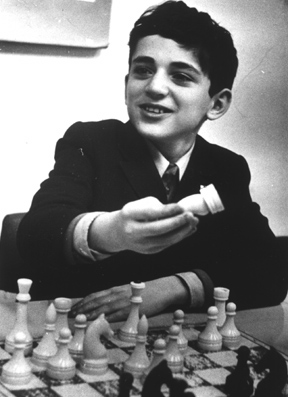
Kasparov at age 11, Vilnius, 1974

Kasparov was born Garik Kimovich Weinstein (Russian: Гарик Кимович Вайнштейн, romanized: Garik Kimovich Vainshtein) in Baku, Azerbaijan SSR (now Azerbaijan), Soviet Union. His father, Kim Moiseyevich Weinstein, was Jewish and his mother, Klara Shagenovna Kasparova, was Armenian. Both of his mother's parents were Armenians from Karabakh. According to Kasparov himself, he was named after United States President Harry S. Truman, (Note: 'Harry' and 'Garry' are homophones in Russian.) "whom my father admired for taking a strong stand against communism. It was a rare name in Russia, until Harry Potter came along." Kasparov has described himself as a "self-appointed Christian", although "very indifferent" and identifying as Russian: "[A]lthough I'm half-Armenian, half-Jewish, I consider myself Russian because Russian is my native tongue, and I grew up with Russian culture."

When he was seven years old, his father died of leukemia. At the age of twelve, Kasparov, upon the request of his mother Klara and with the consent of the family, adopted Klara's surname Kasparov. Kasparov and his family had to flee anti-Armenian pogroms in Baku in January 1990.

=== Introduction to chess ===
Kasparov began the serious study of chess after he came across a problem set up by his parents and proposed a solution. From age seven, he attended the Young Pioneer Palace in Baku and, at ten, began training at Mikhail Botvinnik's chess school under coach Vladimir Makogonov. When Kasparov was 11, Botvinnik wrote, "The future of chess lies in the hands of this young man." Makogonov helped develop Kasparov's positional skills and taught him to play the Caro–Kann Defence and the Tartakower System of the Queen's Gambit Declined. Kasparov won the Soviet Junior Championship in Tbilisi in 1976, scoring 7/9 points, at age 13. He repeated the feat the following year, winning with a score of 8½/9. He was being coached by Alexander Shakarov during this time.

== Chess career ==
=== Rising up the ranks ===
In early 1978, Kasparov participated in the Sokolsky Memorial tournament in Minsk. Normally only established masters and local players were invited, but he received a special invitation, and took first place. Kasparov said that after the victory, he thought he had a "very good shot" at the world championship. He first qualified for the USSR Chess Championship at age 15 in 1978, the youngest-ever player at that level, by winning a 64-player Swiss system tournament at Daugavpils. He scored 9/17 in that Soviet championship.

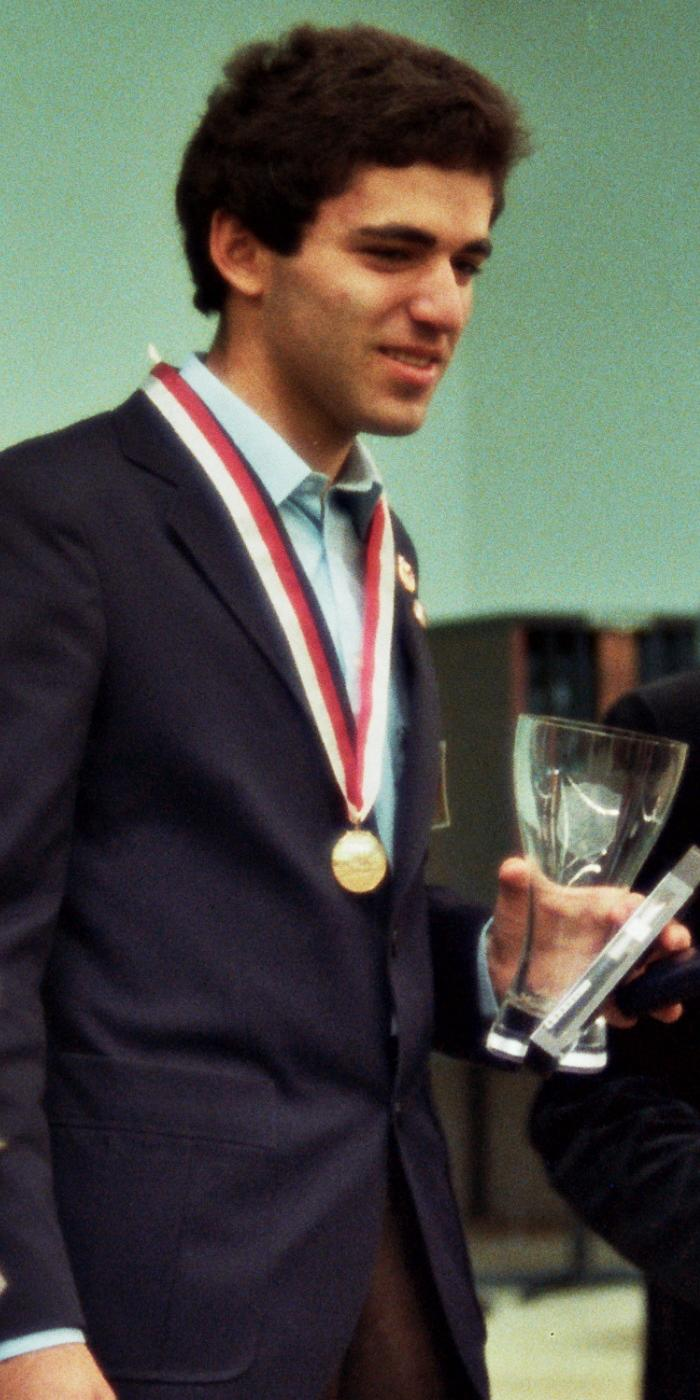
Kasparov at World Junior Championship victory ceremony, Dortmund, 1980

Kasparov's first international tournament was in Banja Luka, Yugoslavia, in April 1979 while he was still unrated. Kasparov won this high-class tournament by 2 points, emerging with a provisional rating of 2545, enough to rank him equal 40th in the world. The next year, 1980, he won the World Junior Chess Championship in Dortmund, West Germany. Later that year, he made his debut as the second reserve for the Soviet Union at the Chess Olympiad at Valletta, Malta, and became a Grandmaster. He quickly rose up the world rankings: equal 15th in January 1980, sixth in January 1981, equal fourth in July 1981, fourth in January 1982 and second behind Karpov in July 1982.

As a teenager, Kasparov shared the USSR Chess Championship in 1981 with Lev Psakhis (12½/17), although Psakhis won their game. His second win in an international tournament was scored at Bugojno, Yugoslavia, in 1982, overcoming Tigran Petrosian in the final. This victory earned him a place in the 1982 Moscow Interzonal tournament, which he won, to qualify for the Candidates Tournament. At age 19, he was the youngest Candidate since Bobby Fischer, who was 15 when he qualified in 1958.

Kasparov's first (quarter-final) Candidates match was against Alexander Beliavsky, whom he defeated 6–3 (four wins, one loss). Politics threatened Kasparov's semi-final against Victor Korchnoi, which was scheduled to be played in Pasadena, California. The Soviet authorities would not allow Kasparov to travel to the United States, meaning that Korchnoi could have had a walkover. This decision was met with disapproval by the chess world, and Korchnoi agreed to the match to being played in London instead, along with the previously scheduled match between Vasily Smyslov and Zoltán Ribli. The Kasparov-Korchnoi match was put together on short notice by Raymond Keene. Kasparov lost the first game but won the match 7–4 (four wins, one loss).

In January 1984, Kasparov became the No. 1 ranked player in the world, with a FIDE rating of 2710. He became the youngest-ever world No. 1, a record that lasted 12 years until being broken by Kramnik in January 1996. That same year, he won the Candidates' final 8½–4½ (four wins, no losses) against former world champion Smyslov at Vilnius, thus qualifying to play Karpov for the world championship.

=== 1984–1985 world championship ===
The World Chess Championship 1984–1985 match between Kasparov and Karpov had many ups and downs and a controversial finish. Karpov started in very good form, and after nine games Kasparov was down 4–0 in a "first to six wins" match. In an unexpected turn of events, there followed a series of 17 successive draws, some relatively short, others drawn in unsettled positions. Kasparov lost game 27 (5–0), then fought back with another series of draws until game 32, earning his first-ever win against the world champion and bringing the score to 5–1. Another 14 successive draws followed, through game 46; the previous record length for a world title match had been 34 games (José Raúl Capablanca vs. Alexander Alekhine in 1927).

Kasparov won games 47 and 48 to bring the score to 5–3 in Karpov's favour. Then the match was ended without result by FIDE President Florencio Campomanes, and a new match was announced to start a few months later. The termination was controversial, as both players stated that they preferred the match to continue. Announcing his decision, Campomanes cited the health of the players, which had been strained by the length of the match. According to grandmasters (GMs) Boris Gulko and Korchnoi, and historians Vladimir Popow and Yuri Felshtinsky in their The KGB Plays Chess book, Campomanes had been a KGB agent and was tasked with preventing Karpov's defeat at all costs; and the match was terminated while Karpov was still ahead to avoid the impression that the decision had been made for his benefit. US grandmaster Andy Soltis said it was "absurd" to suggest that Campomones was a KGB agent, but thought that his decisions in the match favoured Karpov.

The match became the first, and so far only, world championship match to be abandoned without a result. Kasparov's relations with Campomanes and FIDE became strained, and matters came to a head in 1993 with Kasparov's complete break-away from FIDE.

=== World champion ===
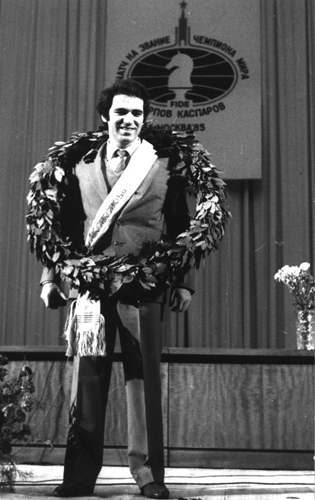
Kasparov after winning the FIDE World Championship title in 1985

The second Karpov–Kasparov match in 1985 was organised in Moscow as the best of 24 games, where the first player to win 12½ points would claim the title. The scores from the terminated match would not carry over; however, in the event of a 12–12 draw, the title would remain with Karpov. On 9 November 1985, Kasparov secured the world crown by a score of 13–11. Karpov, with White, needed to win the 24th game to retain the title but Kasparov won it with the Sicilian Defence. He was 22 years old at the time, making him the youngest-ever world champion, a record held by Mikhail Tal for over 20 years. Kasparov's win with Black in the 16th game has been recognised as one of the all-time chess masterpieces, including being voted the best game played during the first 64 issues of the magazine Chess Informant.

At the time, the champion still had the right to a rematch after losing the title. This rematch took place in 1986, hosted jointly in London and Leningrad, with each city hosting 12 games. At one point in the match, Kasparov opened a three-point lead and looked well on his way to a decisive victory. But Karpov fought back by winning three consecutive games to level the score late in the match. At this point, Kasparov dismissed one of his seconds, grandmaster Evgeny Vladimirov, accusing him of selling his opening preparation to the Karpov team. Kasparov scored one more win and kept his title by a score of 12½–11½.

A fourth match for the world title took place in 1987 in Seville, as Karpov had qualified through the Candidates' Matches to become the official challenger once again. This match was also very close, with neither player holding more than a one-point lead at any time. With one game left, Kasparov was down a point and needed a win to draw the match and retain his title. A long, tense game ensued, in which Karpov blundered away a pawn just before the first time control. Kasparov then won a long ending to retain the title on a 12–12 scoreline.

Kasparov and Karpov met for a fifth time, on this occasion in New York City and Lyon in 1990, with each city hosting 12 games. Again, the result was a close one, with Kasparov winning by a margin of 12½–11½. In their five world championship matches, Kasparov had 21 wins, 19 losses and 104 draws in 144 games.

=== Break with and ejection from FIDE ===
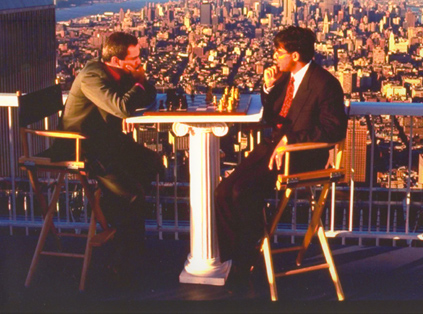
Kasparov and Anand in a publicity photo on top of the World Trade Center in New York, 1995

In November 1986, Kasparov had created the Grandmasters Association (GMA) to represent professional players and give them more say in FIDE's activities. Kasparov assumed a leadership role. GMA's major achievement was in organising a series of six World Cup tournaments for the world's top players. This caused an uneasy relationship to develop between Kasparov and FIDE. The previous month, Kasparov had made his feelings clear to fellow grandmaster Keene: "Campomanes must go. It is war to the death with him as far as I am concerned. I will do everything I can to remove him."

This stand-off lasted until 1993, by which time a new challenger had qualified through the Candidates cycle: Nigel Short, a British grandmaster who had defeated Karpov in a qualifying match and then Jan Timman in the finals held in early 1993. After a confusing and compressed bidding process produced lower financial estimates than expected, the world champion and his challenger both rejected FIDE's bid for an August match in Manchester and decided to play outside FIDE's jurisdiction. Their match took place under the auspices of the Professional Chess Association (PCA), an organisation established by Kasparov and Short. At this point, a fracture occurred in the lineage of the FIDE World Championship. In an interview in 2007, Kasparov called the break with FIDE in 1993 the worst mistake of his career, as it hurt the game in the long run.

Kasparov and Short were ejected from FIDE and played their well-sponsored match in London in September 1993. Kasparov won convincingly by a score of 12½–7½. The match considerably raised the profile of chess in the UK, with a substantial level of coverage on Channel 4. Meanwhile, FIDE organised its world championship match between Timman (the defeated Candidates finalist) and former world champion Karpov (a defeated Candidates semi-finalist), which Karpov won. FIDE removed Kasparov and Short from its rating list. Subsequently, the PCA created a rating list of its own, which featured all the world's top players regardless of their relation to FIDE. There were now two world champions: PCA champion Kasparov and FIDE champion Karpov. The title remained split for 13 years.

Kasparov defended his PCA title in a 1995 match against Viswanathan Anand at the World Trade Center in New York City. Kasparov won the match by four wins to one, with thirteen draws. He tried to organise another world championship match under a different organisation, the World Chess Association (WCA), with Linares International Chess Tournament organiser Luis Rentero. Alexei Shirov and Kramnik played a candidates match to decide the challenger, which Shirov won in an upset. But when Rentero admitted that the funds required and promised had never materialised, the WCA collapsed. Yet another body stepped in, BrainGames.com, headed by Raymond Keene. After a match with Shirov could not be agreed by BrainGames.com and talks with Anand collapsed, a match was instead arranged against Kramnik.

During this period, Kasparov was approached by Oakham School in the United Kingdom, at the time the only school in the country with a full-time chess coach, and developed an interest in the use of chess in education. In 1997, Kasparov supported a scholarship programme at the school.

=== Losing the title and aftermath ===
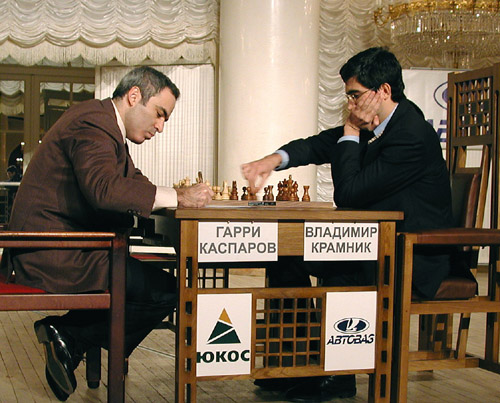
Kasparov playing against Kramnik in the Botvinnik Memorial match in Moscow, 2001

The Kasparov–Kramnik match took place in London during the latter half of 2000. Kramnik had been a student of Kasparov's at the famous Botvinnik/Kasparov chess school in Russia and had served on Kasparov's team for the 1995 match with Anand. Kasparov found that Kramnik was better prepared. As White, Kasparov could not crack the passive but solid Berlin Defence in the Ruy Lopez, and Kramnik managed to draw all his games as Black. As Black, Kasparov lost two (games 2 and 10), meaning Kramnik won the match 8½–6½, and Kramnik succeeded Kasparov as the Classical World Champion.

After losing the title, Kasparov won a series of major tournaments and remained the top-rated player in the world, ahead of both Kramnik and the FIDE World Champion. In 2001, he refused an invitation to the 2002 Candidates Tournament to choose Kramnik's first challenger, claiming his results had earned him a rematch with Kramnik. Kasparov and Karpov played a four-game match with rapid time controls over two days in December 2002 in New York City. Kasparov suffered a surprise loss (1½–2½).

Because of Kasparov's continuing strong results and status as FIDE world No. 1, he was included in the so-called "Prague Agreement", masterminded by Yasser Seirawan and intended to reunite the two world championships. Kasparov was to play a match against the FIDE World Champion Ponomariov in September 2003. But this match was called off after Ponomariov refused to sign his contract for it without reservation. In its place, there were plans for a match against Rustam Kasimdzhanov, winner of the FIDE World Chess Championship 2004, to be held in January 2005 in the United Arab Emirates. These also fell through owing to a lack of funding. Plans to hold the match in Turkey instead came too late. Kasparov announced in January 2005 that he was tired of waiting for FIDE to arrange a match and had decided to stop all efforts to become undisputed world champion once more.

=== Retirement from regular competitive chess ===
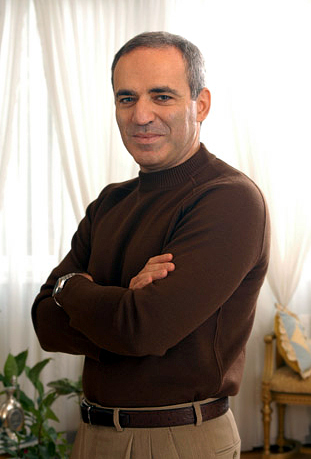
Kasparov in 2007

After winning the prestigious Linares tournament for the ninth time, Kasparov announced on 10 March 2005 that he would retire from regular competitive chess. He cited as the reason a lack of personal goals in the chess world. When winning the Russian championship in 2004, he commented that it had been the last major title he had never won outright. He also expressed frustration at the failure to reunify the world championship. Kasparov said he might play in some rapid chess events for fun, but he intended to spend more time on his books, including the My Great Predecessors series, and work on the links between decision-making in chess and other areas of life. He also stated that he would continue to involve himself in Russian politics, which he viewed as "headed down the wrong path".

=== Post-retirement chess ===
On 22 August 2006, in his first public chess games since his retirement, Kasparov played in the Lichthof Chess Champions Tournament, a blitz event played at the time control of five minutes per side and three-second increments per move. Kasparov tied for first with Karpov, scoring 4½/6. The pair played a 12-game match from 21 to 24 September 2009, in Valencia, Spain. It consisted of four rapid (or semi rapid) games, in which Kasparov won 3–1, and eight blitz games, in which Kasparov won 6–2, winning the match with a final result of 9–3. The event took place exactly 25 years after the two players' unfinished encounter at World Chess Championship 1984.

Kasparov coached Carlsen for approximately one year, beginning in February 2009. The collaboration remained secret until September 2009. Under Kasparov's tutelage, in October 2009 Carlsen became the youngest ever to achieve a FIDE rating higher than 2800, and he rose from world number four to world number one. While the pair initially planned to work together throughout 2010, in March of that year it was announced that Carlsen had split from Kasparov and would no longer be using him as a trainer. According to an interview with the German magazine Der Spiegel, Carlsen indicated that he would remain in contact and that he would continue to attend training sessions with Kasparov; however, no further training sessions were held, and the cooperation fizzled out over the course of the spring. In 2011, Carlsen said: "Thanks to [Kasparov] I began to understand a whole class of positions better. ... Kasparov gave me a great deal of practical help." In 2012, when asked what he learnt from working with Kasparov, Carlsen answered: "Complex positions. That was the most important thing."

In May 2010, Kasparov played and won 30 games simultaneously against players at Tel Aviv University in Israel. In the same month, it was revealed that he had aided Anand in his preparation for the World Chess Championship 2010 against challenger Veselin Topalov. Anand won the match 6½–5½ to retain the title. Kasparov began training the US grandmaster Hikaru Nakamura in January 2011. The first of several training sessions was held in New York just before Nakamura participated in the Tata Steel Chess tournament in Wijk aan Zee, the Netherlands. In December 2011, it was announced that their cooperation had come to an end.

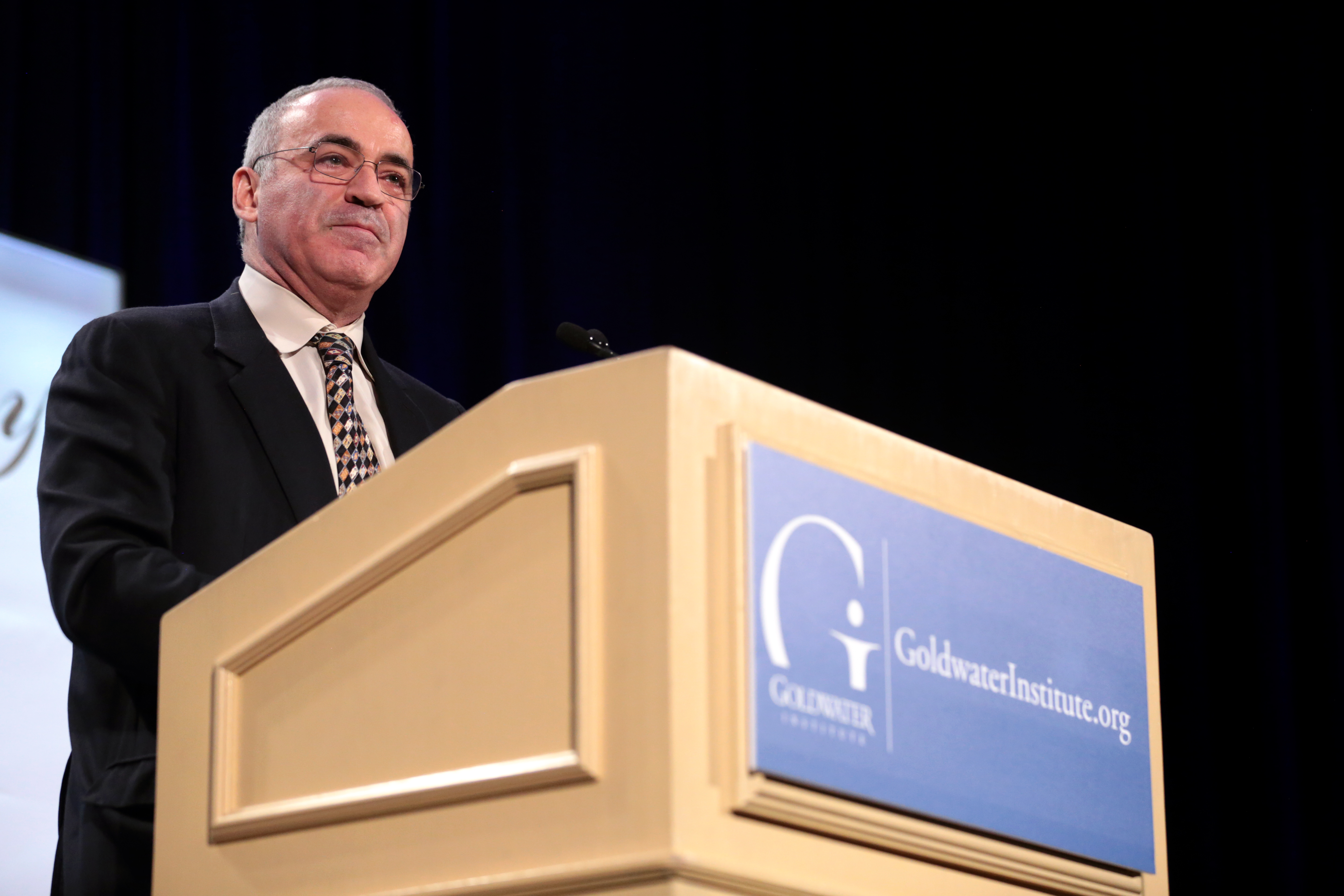
Kasparov delivering a speech in Arizona in October 2017

Kasparov played two blitz exhibition matches in the autumn of 2011. The first was in September against French grandmaster Maxime Vachier-Lagrave, in Clichy (France), which Kasparov won 1½–½. The second was a longer match consisting of eight blitz games played on 9 October, against English grandmaster Short. Kasparov won again by a score of 4½–3½. A little after that, in October 2011, Kasparov played and defeated fourteen opponents in a simultaneous exhibition that took place in Bratislava.

On 25 and 26 April 2015, Kasparov played a mini-match against Short. The match consisted of two rapid games and eight blitz games and was contested over the course of two days. Commentators GM Maurice Ashley and Alejandro Ramírez remarked how Kasparov was an 'initiative hog' throughout the match, consistently not allowing Short to gain any foothold in the games. Kasparov won the match decisively (8½–1½), winning all five games on the second day. These victories were characterised by aggressive pawn moves breaking up Short's position, thereby allowing Kasparov's pieces to achieve positional superiority.

Kasparov played and won all nineteen games of a simultaneous exhibition in Pula, Croatia on 19 August 2015. At the Chess Club and Scholastic Center of Saint Louis on 28 and 29 April 2016, Kasparov played a 6-round exhibition blitz round-robin tournament with Fabiano Caruana, Wesley So and Nakamura in an event called the Ultimate Blitz Challenge. He finished the tournament third with 9½/18, behind Nakamura (11/18) and So (10/18). At the post-tournament interview, Kasparov announced that he would donate his winnings from playing the next top-level blitz exhibition match to assist funding of the American Olympiad team. On 2 June 2016, Kasparov played against fifteen chess players in a simultaneous exhibition in the Kaiser-Friedrich-Halle of Mönchengladbach. He won all games.

Kasparov participated in the inaugural St. Louis Rapid and Blitz tournament from 14 to 19 August 2017, scoring 3½/9 in the rapid and 9/18 in the blitz, representing Croatia. He finished eighth in a strong field of ten, including Nakamura, Caruana, former world champion Anand and the eventual winner, Levon Aronian. Kasparov promised that any tournament money he earned would go towards charities to promote chess in Africa. In 2020, he participated in 9LX, a Chess960 tournament, and finished eighth of a field of ten players. His game against Carlsen, who tied for first place, was drawn.

He launched Kasparov Chess, a subscription-based online chess community featuring documentaries, lessons, puzzles, podcasts, articles, interviews and playing zones, in 2021. He also played in the blitz section of the Grand Chess Tour 2021 event in Zagreb, Croatia. He performed poorly, however, scoring ½/9 on the first day and 2/9 on the second day, getting his only win against Jorden van Foreest. He also participated in 9LX 2, finishing fifth in a field of ten players, with a score of 5/9.

== Olympiads and major team events ==
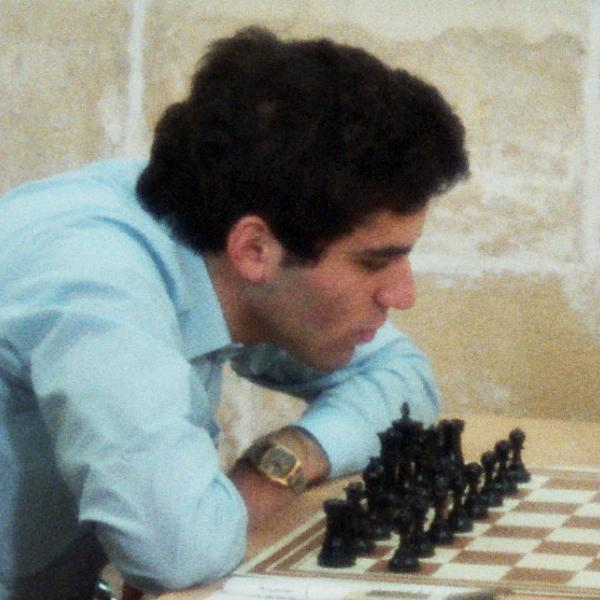
Kasparov at Valletta in 1980

Kasparov played in a total of eight Chess Olympiads. He represented the Soviet Union four times and Russia four times, following the break-up of the Soviet Union in 1991. In his 1980 Olympiad debut, he became, at age 17, the youngest player to represent the Soviet Union or Russia at that level, a record which was broken by Kramnik in 1992. In 82 games, he scored (+50−3=29), for 78.7%, and won a total of nineteen medals, including team gold medals all eight times he competed.

For the 1994 Moscow Olympiad, he had a significant organisational role in helping to put together the event on short notice, after Thessaloniki cancelled its offer to host only a few weeks before the scheduled dates. Kasparov's detailed Olympiad record follows:

- Valletta 1980, USSR 2nd reserve, 9½/12 (+8−1=3), team gold, board bronze;
- Lucerne 1982, USSR 2nd board, 8½/11 (+6−0=5), team gold, board bronze;
- Dubai 1986, USSR 1st board, 8½/11 (+7−1=3), team gold, board gold, performance gold;
- Thessaloniki 1988, USSR 1st board, 8½/10 (+7−0=3), team gold, board gold, performance gold;
- Manila 1992, Russia board 1, 8½/10 (+7−0=3), team gold, board gold, performance silver;
- Moscow 1994, Russia board 1, 6½/10 (+4−1=5), team gold;
- Yerevan 1996, Russia board 1, 7/9 (+5−0=4), team gold, board silver, performance gold;
- Bled 2002, Russia board 1, 7½/9 (+6−0=3), team gold, performance gold.

Kasparov made his international debut for the USSR at age 16 in the 1980 European Team Championship and played for Russia in the 1992 edition of that championship. He won a total of five medals. His detailed record in this event follows:

- Skara 1980, USSR 2nd reserve, 5½/6 (+5−0=1), team gold, board gold;
- Debrecen 1992, Russia board 1, 6/8 (+4−0=4), team gold, board gold, performance silver.

Kasparov also represented the USSR once at the Youth Olympiad in Austria (1981). He scored 9/10 (+8–0=2) on the top board and his team lifted the title.

== Assessment and legacy ==
Kasparov received a Chess Oscar eleven times as the best chess player of the year, in 1982–1983, 1985–1988, 1995–1996, 1999 and 2001–2002. He was also awarded the Marca Leyenda trophy in 1997. Between 1981 and 1991, he won or tied for first place in every tournament he entered. In 1999, Kasparov reached an Elo rating of 2851, a record that stood for over thirteen years, until Carlsen achieved 2861 in January 2013. With the exception of the PCA period and sharing first place with Kramnik in 1996, Kasparov led the rating list from 1985 to 2006 – a total of 255 months. On 1 January 2006, Kasparov ranked first with 2812. He was excluded from the FIDE rating list of 1 April 2006, however, because he had not participated in tournaments for the previous twelve months.

The rivalry between Kasparov and Karpov (often referred to as the "two Ks") is one of the greatest in the history of chess. In six years they played five matches comprising 144 games. For a long time there was personal enmity between Karpov and Kasparov. The conflict between the two men also had a political connotation. Karpov was considered a representative of the Soviet nomenklatura, while Kasparov was young and popular, positioned himself as a "child of change", willingly gave candid interviews and (especially in the West) had an aura of a rebel, although he was never a dissident. Kasparov's 1985 victory coincided with the start of perestroika in the Soviet Union.

Carlsen said of Kasparov: "I've never seen someone with such a feel for dynamics in complex positions." Kramnik has opined that Kasparov's "capacity for study is second to none", adding "There is nothing in chess he has been unable to deal with." In 2007, the international consulting company Synectics published a rating of 100 living geniuses in science, politics, art and entrepreneurship, in which Kasparov ranked 25th. Less known about Kasparov is his emphasis on physical fitness, including taking a month off each year to work out strenuously.

=== Playing style ===
Kramnik called Kasparov a chess player with virtually no weaknesses. His games are characterised by a dynamic style of play with a focus on tactics, depth of strategy, subtle calculation and original opening ideas. Kasparov was known for his extensive opening preparation and aggressive play in it. Sergey Shipov considered Kasparov's moral and volitional qualities (impulsiveness and psychological instability) and excessive reliance on options, which can lead to overwork and mistakes, as amongst his few shortcomings.

Kasparov's attacking style of play has been compared by many to Alekhine, his chess idol since childhood. Kasparov has described his style as being influenced chiefly by Alekhine, Tal and Fischer. Other influences on Kasparov were his early coaches. At a young age, he met with experienced teachers Alexander Nikitin and Alexander Shakarov. Shakarov collected and systematised materials, and then became the keeper of Kasparov's "information bank". A revolutionary step at that time was the involvement of computer programs in analysing games, and it was Kasparov and his team who took the first steps in this direction. In 1973, Kasparov entered the Botvinnik school and immediately attracted attention. Botvinnik commented on the young schoolboy: "Garry's speed and memory capacity are amazing. He counts deep variations and finds unexpected moves. The power of combinational vision makes him similar to Alekhine himself."

=== Contributions to opening theory ===
Kasparov has made many contributions to opening theory, including co-authoring several books on the subject. In the 1990s, he systematically developed new variants with computer programs. He also "reanimated" the Scotch Game in top-level competitions. Kasparov successfully used this opening, which was considered outdated, in the 1990 match against Karpov and in matches with Short and Anand. One of the offshoots of the Sicilian in the Szén Variation is called the Kasparov Gambit. Kasparov used this variation in the 12th and 16th games of the match with Karpov in 1985; in the second of these games, he scored a victory. Another well-known case of winning an important game thanks to a novelty in the opening is Kasparov's 10th game of the 1995 match against Anand. On the 14th move, in a well-known position of the open variation of the Spanish Game (Ruy Lopez), Kasparov discovered a new idea with a rook sacrifice, which brought a decisive attack.

=== Chess rating ===
Kasparov holds the record for the longest time as the No. 1 rated player in the world—from 1984 to 2005 (Kramnik shared the No. 1 ranking with him once, in the January 1996 FIDE rating list). He headed the PCA rating list during the split from FIDE. At the time of his retirement, he was still ranked No. 1 in the world, with a rating of 2812. His rating has fallen inactive since the January 2006 rating list. In January 1990, Kasparov achieved the (then) highest FIDE rating ever, passing 2800 and breaking Fischer's old record of 2785. By the July 1999 and January 2000 FIDE rating lists, Kasparov had reached a 2851 Elo rating, at that time the highest rating ever achieved. He held that record until Carlsen attained a new record high rating of 2861 in January 2013.

=== Other achievements ===
Kasparov holds the record for most consecutive professional tournament victories, placing first or equal first in fifteen individual tournaments from 1981 to 1990. The streak was broken by Vasyl Ivanchuk at Linares 1991, where Kasparov placed second, half a point behind him after losing their individual game. The details of this record winning streak follow:

- Frunze 1981, USSR Championship, 12½/17, tie for 1st;
- Bugojno 1982, 9½/13, 1st;
- Moscow 1982, Interzonal, 10/13, 1st;
- Nikšić 1983, 11/14, 1st;
- Brussels OHRA 1986, 7½/10, 1st;
- Brussels SWIFT 1987, 8½/11, tie for 1st;
- Amsterdam Optiebeurs 1988, 9/12, 1st;
- Belfort (World Cup) 1988, 11½/15, 1st;
- Moscow 1988, USSR Championship, 11½/17, tie for 1st;
- Reykjavík (World Cup) 1988, 11/17, 1st;
- Barcelona (World Cup) 1989, 11/16, tie for 1st;
- Skellefteå (World Cup) 1989, 9½/15, tie for 1st;
- Tilburg 1989, 12/14, 1st;
- Belgrade (Investbank) 1989, 9½/11, 1st;
- Linares 1990, 8/11, 1st.

Kasparov went nine years winning every super-tournament he played, in addition to contesting his series of five consecutive matches with Karpov. His only failure in this time period in either tournament or match play was the 1984 world title match against Karpov.

In the late 1990s, Kasparov went on another long streak of ten consecutive super-tournament wins.

- Wijk aan Zee Hoogovens 1999, 10/13, 1st;
- Linares 1999, 10½/14, 1st;
- Sarajevo 1999, 7/9, 1st;
- Wijk aan Zee Corus 2000, 9½/13, 1st;
- Linares 2000, 6/10, tie for 1st;
- Sarajevo 2000, 8½/11, 1st;
- Wijk aan Zee Corus 2001, 9/13, 1st;
- Linares 2001, 7½/10, 1st;
- Astana 2001, 7/10, 1st;
- Linares 2002, 8/12, 1st.

In these tournament victories, Kasparov had a score of 53 wins, 61 draws and 1 loss in 115 games, his only defeat coming against Ivan Sokolov in Wijk aan Zee 1999.

=== Notable games ===
- Anatoly Karpov vs Garry Kasparov, World Chess Championship 1985, Game 16, Sicilian Defence, Taimanov variation (B44), 0-1 An example of him at his very best, Kasparov takes advantage of Karpov's setup in the opening, offering a pawn sacrifice before dominating all three of White's major pieces with an "octopus knight" on d3.
- Garry Kasparov vs Veselin Topalov, Hoogovens Tournament Group A, Wijk aan Zee 1999, Round 4, Pirc Defence (B07), 1-0 In what is widely regarded as his masterpiece, Kasparov unleashes multiple brilliancies as he hunts down Black's king from one side of the board to another, ending in a precise combination.

== Chess and computers ==
Acorn Computers acted as one of the sponsors for Kasparov's Candidates semi-final match against Korchnoi in 1983. This was Kasparov's first introduction to computers. Kasparov was awarded a BBC Micro, which he took back with him to Baku, making it perhaps one of the first Western-made microcomputers to reach the Soviet Union at that time. Computer chess magazine editor Frederic Friedel consulted with Kasparov in 1985 on how a chess database program would be useful preparation for competition. Friedel founded Chessbase two years later, and he gave a copy of the program to Kasparov, who started using it in his preparation. That same year, Kasparov played against thirty-two chess computers in Hamburg, winning all games. Several commercially available Kasparov computers were made in the 1980s, the Saitek Kasparov Turbo King models. On 22 October 1989, Kasparov defeated the chess computer Deep Thought in both games of a two-game match. In December 1992, Kasparov played thirty-seven blitz games against Fritz 2 in Cologne, winning 24, drawing 4 and losing 9.

Kasparov cooperated in producing video material for the computer game Kasparov's Gambit released by Electronic Arts in November 1993. In April 1994, Intel acted as a sponsor for the first Professional Chess Association Grand Prix event in Moscow, played at a time control of twenty-five minutes per game. In May, Chessbase's Fritz 3 running on an Intel Pentium PC defeated Kasparov in their first game in the Intel Express blitz tournament in Munich, but Kasparov managed to tie it for first and won the play-off (+3=2). The next day, Kasparov lost to Fritz 3 again in a game on ZDF TV. In August, Kasparov was knocked out of the London Intel Grand Prix by Richard Lang's ChessGenius 2 program in the first round. In 1995, during Kasparov's world title match with Anand, he unveiled an opening novelty that had been checked with a chess engine, an approach that would become increasingly common in subsequent years.

Kasparov played in a pair of six-game chess matches with IBM supercomputer Deep Blue. The first match took place in Philadelphia in February 1996 and was won by Kasparov (4–2). The second was played in New York City in May 1997 and won by Deep Blue (3½–2½). The 1997 match was the first defeat of a reigning world champion by a computer under tournament conditions. The match was even after five games but Kasparov lost quickly in Game 6. Kasparov said that he was "not well prepared" to face Deep Blue in 1997. He said that based on his "objective strengths" his play was stronger than that of Deep Blue. Kasparov claimed that several factors weighed against him in this match. In particular, he was denied access to Deep Blue's recent games, in contrast to the computer's team, which could study hundreds of Kasparov's.

After the loss, Kasparov said that he sometimes saw deep intelligence and creativity in the machine's moves, suggesting that during the second game chess players had intervened in contravention of the rules. IBM denied that it had cheated, stating the only human intervention occurred between games. The rules provided for the developers to modify the program between games, an opportunity they said they used to shore up weaknesses in the computer's play revealed during the course of the match. Kasparov requested printouts of the machine's log files but IBM refused, although the company later published them on the Internet. Much later, it was suggested that the behaviour Kasparov noted had resulted from a glitch in the computer program. Plans for further engagement between Kasparov and IBM, including a rematch, did not come to fruition, due to the accusations of cheating.

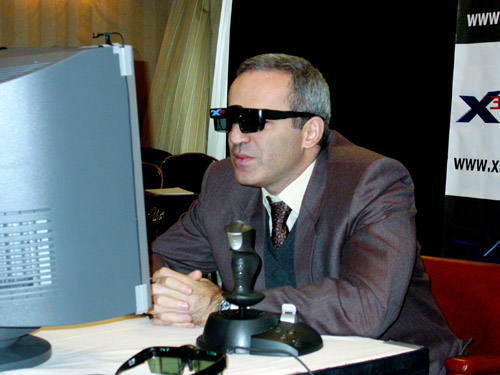
Kasparov wearing 3D glasses in his match against the program X3D Fritz

Kasparov versus the World was a game that took place in 1999. Kasparov conducted White's moves while more than 50,000 people from all over the globe played against him. The game was a huge mixture of tactical and strategical ideas, with Kasparov saying: "It is the greatest game in the history of chess. The sheer number of ideas, the complexity, and the contribution it has made to chess make it the most important game ever played." After 62 moves, Kasparov won the game.

In January 2003, he engaged in a six-game classical time control match, with a $1 million prize fund, against Deep Junior. It was billed as the FIDE "Man vs. Machine" world championship. The engine evaluated three million positions per second. After one win each and three draws, it was all up to the final game. After reaching a decent position, Kasparov offered a draw, which was accepted by the Deep Junior team. Asked why he had offered the draw, Kasparov said he feared making a blunder. Deep Junior was the first machine to beat Kasparov with Black and at a standard time control.

In June 2003, Mindscape released the computer game Kasparov Chessmate, with Kasparov himself listed as a co-designer. In November 2003, he engaged in a four-game match against the computer program X3D Fritz, using a virtual board, 3D glasses and a speech recognition system. After two draws and one win apiece, the X3D Man–Machine match ended in a draw. Kasparov received $175,000 and took home a golden trophy. He continued to regret the blunder in the second game that cost him a crucial point. He felt that he had outplayed the machine overall and performed well: "I only made one mistake but unfortunately that one mistake lost the game."

In 2021, Kasparov promoted a series of 32 Non-fungible tokens (NFTs) that detailed important moments in his career. The top four sold for more than $11,000.

=== Artificial intelligence ===
Speaking to Forbes in spring 2023, Kasparov said that he was not overly concerned about the potential for ChatGPT to gain unauthorised access into everyday appliances. Rather, he felt that it is individuals who "still have the monopoly on evil".

== Candidate for FIDE presidency ==
On 7 October 2013, Kasparov announced his candidacy for World Chess Federation president during a reception in Tallinn, Estonia, where the 84th FIDE Congress took place. He was supported by reigning world champion and FIDE No. 1 ranked player Carlsen. At the FIDE General Assembly in August 2014, Kasparov lost the presidential election to the incumbent Kirsan Ilyumzhinov, with a vote of 110–61. A few days before the election took place, The New York Times Magazine had published a report on the viciously fought campaign. Included was information about a leaked contract between Kasparov and former FIDE Secretary General Ignatius Leong from Singapore, in which the Kasparov campaign reportedly "offered to pay Leong US$500,000 and to pay $250,000 a year for four years to the ASEAN Chess Academy, an organisation Leong helped create to teach the game, specifying that Leong would be responsible for delivering 11 votes from his region [...]". In September 2015, the FIDE Ethics Commission found Kasparov and Leong guilty of violating its Code of Ethics and later suspended them for two years from all FIDE functions and meetings.

== Politics and political views ==
=== Overview ===
For full details of Kasparov's involvement in politics in Russia – membership of the Communist Party (1984–1991), his role in the establishment of several pro-democracy movements, leaving Russia in 2013 and subsequent opposition from exile to the regime of Vladimir Putin – and his thoughts on a number of international conflicts and questions, including the Yugoslav Wars of the 1990s, the Nagorno-Karabakh conflict in Armenia, the conflict in the Middle East, Catalan independence and the Gaza genocide, see the Political views of Garry Kasparov.

=== Croatian citizenship ===
Kasparov had maintained a summer home in the Croatian city of Makarska. In February 2014, he applied for citizenship by naturalisation in Croatia, according to media reports, claiming he was finding it increasingly difficult to live in Russia. According to an article in The Guardian, Kasparov was "widely perceived" as having been a vocal supporter of Croatian independence during the early 1990s. Later in February 2014, his application for naturalisation was approved and he had a meeting with Croatian prime minister Zoran Milanović on 27 February. Croatian press cited his "lobbying for Croatia in 1991" as grounds for the expedited naturalisation. In an interview for a Croatian daily published in February 2022, Kasparov said he was "very grateful" to Milanović for the help rendered by him (then as prime minister) in obtaining Croatian citizenship.

== Books and other writings ==
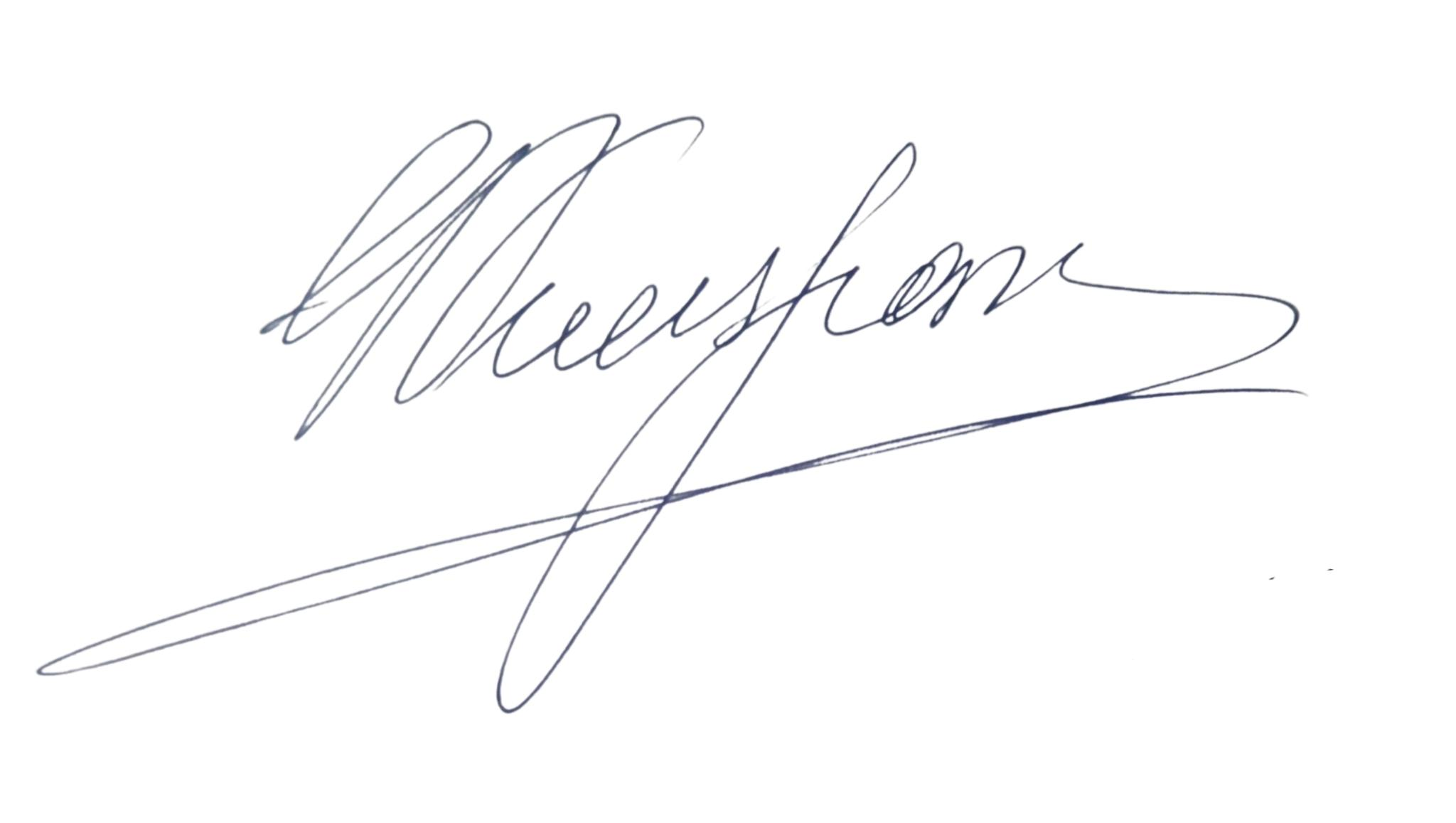
Kasparov autograph

=== Early writings ===
Kasparov has written books on chess. He published a controversial autobiography when still in his early 20s. Originally titled Child of Change, it was later published as Unlimited Challenge. This book was updated several times after he became world champion. Its content is mainly literary, with a small chess component of key unannotated games. He published an annotated games collection in 1983, Fighting Chess: My Games and Career, which has been updated in further editions. He also wrote a book annotating the games from his World Chess Championship 1985 victory, World Chess Championship Match: Moscow, 1985.

He has annotated his own games extensively for the Yugoslav Chess Informant series. In 1982, he co-authored Batsford Chess Openings with British grandmaster Keene. That book sold well and was updated in a second edition in 1989. He also co-authored two opening books with his trainer Alexander Nikitin in the 1980s for British publisher Batsford – on the Classical Variation of the Caro–Kann Defence and on the Scheveningen Variation of the Sicilian Defence. Kasparov also contributed extensively to the five-volume openings series Encyclopedia of Chess Openings from Chess Informant, for which Kasparov also wrote personal columns called Garry's Choice.

In 2000, Kasparov co-authored Kasparov Against the World: The Story of the Greatest Online Challenge with grandmaster Daniel King. The 202-page book analyses the 1999 Kasparov versus the World game and holds the record for the longest analysis devoted to a single chess game.

=== My Great Predecessors series ===
In 2003, the first volume of his five-volume work Garry Kasparov on My Great Predecessors was published. This volume deals with world champions Wilhelm Steinitz, Emanuel Lasker, Capablanca and Alekhine, and some of their strong contemporaries. It won the British Chess Federation's Book of the Year award in 2003. Volume two, covering Max Euwe, Botvinnik, Smyslov and Tal, appeared later in 2003. Volume three, featuring Tigran Petrosian and Boris Spassky, was published in early 2004. In December 2004, Kasparov released volume four, which covers Samuel Reshevsky, Miguel Najdorf and Bent Larsen (none of whom was world champion), but focuses on Fischer. The fifth volume, devoted to the chess careers of world champion Karpov and challenger Korchnoi, was published in March 2006.

=== Modern Chess series ===
His Revolution in the 70s (published in March 2007) covers "the openings revolution of the 1970s–1980s" and was the first work in a new venture, "Modern Chess Series", which recounted his matches with Karpov and selected games. Revolution in the 70s is about the development of opening theory witnessed in that decade. Systems like the novel "Hedgehog" opening plan of passively developing the pieces no further than the first three ranks were examined in great detail. Kasparov also analysed some of the most notable games played in that period. In a section at the end of the book, top opening theoreticians provided their opinion on progress made in opening theory in the 1980s.

=== Garry Kasparov on Garry Kasparov series ===
From 2011 to 2014, Kasparov published a three-volume series of his games, spanning his career in three eras until he stopped playing full-time in 2005.

=== Winter Is Coming ===
In October 2015, Kasparov published a book titled Winter Is Coming: Why Vladimir Putin and the Enemies of the Free World Must Be Stopped. The title is a reference to the HBO television series Game of Thrones. In the book, Kasparov writes about the need for an organisation composed solely of democratic countries to replace the United Nations. In an interview, he called the United Nations a "catwalk for dictators".

=== Historical revisionism ===
Kasparov believes that the conventional history of civilisation is incorrect. Specifically, he contends that the history of ancient civilisations is based on misdating of events and achievements that occurred in the medieval period. He has cited several aspects of ancient history that, he argues, are likely to be anachronisms. Kasparov has written in support of the pseudohistorical new chronology theory proposed by Anatoly Fomenko, although with some reservations. In 2001, he expressed a desire to devote his time to promoting the new chronology after his chess career. "New Chronology is a great area for investing my intellect ... My analytical abilities are well placed to figure out what was right and what was wrong." "When I stop playing chess, it may well be that I concentrate on promoting these ideas... I believe they can improve our lives." Later, Kasparov renounced his support of Fomenko's theories but reaffirmed his belief that mainstream historical knowledge is inconsistent.

=== Other post-retirement writing ===
Kasparov wrote How Life Imitates Chess, an examination of the parallels between decision-making in chess and in the business world, in 2007. In 2008, he published a sympathetic obituary for Fischer: "I am often asked if I ever met or played Bobby Fischer. The answer is no, I never had that opportunity. But even though he saw me as a member of the evil chess establishment that he felt had robbed and cheated him, I am sorry I never had a chance to thank him personally for what he did for our sport."

Kasparov works closely with Mig Greengard and his comments can often be found on Greengard's blog. Kasparov collaborated with Max Levchin and Peter Thiel on The Blueprint, a book calling for a revival of world innovation, planned for release in March 2013 but cancelled after the authors disagreed on its contents. In an editorial comment on Google's AlphaZero chess-playing system, Kasparov argued that chess has become the model for reasoning in the same way that the fruit fly Drosophila melanogaster became a model organism for geneticists: "I was pleased to see that AlphaZero had a dynamic, open style like my own", he wrote in late 2018.

Kasparov served as a consultant for the 2020 Netflix miniseries The Queen's Gambit and gave an interview to Slate on his contributions. That same year, Kasparov collaborated with Matt Calkins, founder and CEO of Appian, on Hyperautomation, a book about low-code development and the future of business automation. Kasparov wrote the foreword where he discusses his experiences with human–machine relationships. The New York Times published an essay by Kasparov titled "Garry Kasparov: What We Believe About Reality" in 2021. The essay is part of a series called The Big Ideas: What Do We Believe. This work was later published in a compendium titled Question Everything: A Stone Reader.

=== Bibliography ===
- Kasparov Teaches Chess (1984–85, Sport in the USSR Magazine; 1986, First Collier Books)
- The Test of Time (Russian Chess) (1986, Pergamon Pr)
- World Chess Championship Match: Moscow, 1985 (1986, Everyman Chess)
- Child of Change: An Autobiography (1987, Hutchinson)
- London–Leningrad Championship Games (1987, Everyman Chess)
- Unlimited Challenge (1990, Grove Pr)
- The Sicilian Scheveningen (1991, B.T. Batsford Ltd)
- The Queen's Indian Defence: Kasparov System (1991, B.T. Batsford Ltd)
- Kasparov Versus Karpov, 1990 (1991, Everyman Chess)
- Kasparov on the King's Indian (1993, B.T. Batsford Ltd)
- Kasparov, Garry. Jon Speelman and Bob Wade. 1995. Garry Kasparov's Fighting Chess. Henry Holt. ISBN 0-8050-4221-0
- Garry Kasparov's Chess Challenge (1996, Everyman Chess)
- Lessons in Chess (1997, Everyman Chess)
- Kasparov Against the World: The Story of the Greatest Online Challenge (2000, Kasparov Chess Online)
- My Great Predecessors Part I (2003, Everyman Chess)
- My Great Predecessors Part II (2003, Everyman Chess)
- Checkmate!: My First Chess Book (2004, Everyman Mindsports)
- My Great Predecessors Part III (2004, Everyman Chess)
- My Great Predecessors Part IV (2004, Everyman Chess)
- My Great Predecessors Part V (2006, Everyman Chess)
- How Life Imitates Chess (2007, William Heinemann Ltd.)
- Garry Kasparov on Modern Chess, Part I: Revolution in the 70s (2007, Everyman Chess)
- Garry Kasparov on Modern Chess, Part II: Kasparov vs Karpov 1975–1985 (2008, Everyman Chess)
- Garry Kasparov on Modern Chess, Part III: Kasparov vs Karpov 1986–1987 (2009, Everyman Chess)
- Garry Kasparov on Modern Chess, Part IV: Kasparov vs Karpov 1988–2009 (2010, Everyman Chess)
- Garry Kasparov on Garry Kasparov, part I (2011, Everyman Chess)
- Garry Kasparov on Garry Kasparov, part II (2013, Everyman Chess)
- Garry Kasparov on Garry Kasparov, part III (2014, Everyman Chess)
- Winter Is Coming: Why Vladimir Putin and the Enemies of the Free World Must Be Stopped (2015, Public Affairs)
- Deep Thinking with Mig Greengard (2017, Public Affairs)

=== Videos ===
- Kasparov, Garry, Nigel Short, Raymond Keene and Daniel King. 1993. Kasparov Short The Inside Story. Grandmaster Video.
- Kasparov, Garry, Jonathan Tisdall and Jim Plaskett. 2000. My Story. Grandmaster Video.
- Kasparov, Garry. 2004. How to Play the Queen's Gambit. Chessbase. ISBN 978-3-937549-06-4
- Kasparov, Garry. 2005. How to Play the Najdorf. Chessbase. vol. 1 ISBN 978-3-937549-25-5, vol. 2 ISBN 978-3-937549-78-1
- Kasparov, Garry. 2012. How I Became World Champion 1973–1985. Chessbase. ISBN 978-3-86681-341-0
- Kasparov, Garry. 2017. Garry Kasparov Teaches Chess. Masterclass.com.
- Kasparov, Garry. 2022. Stand with Ukraine in the fight against evil, Ted Talk.

== Personal life ==
Kasparov has been married three times: to Masha, with whom he had a daughter, Polina, before divorcing; to Yulia, with whom he had a son, Vadim, before their 2005 divorce; and to Daria (Dasha), with whom he has two children, daughter Aida born in 2006 and son Nickolas born in 2015. Kasparov's wife manages his business activities worldwide through Kasparov International Management Inc. He has lived in New York City since 2013.

== See also ==
- Game Over: Kasparov and the Machine, documentary film.
- Kasparov Chess, Internet chess club.
- List of chess games between Kasparov and Kramnik
- Committee 2008
- Putinism
- Advanced chess

== Notes ==
Sporting positions
Preceded by Anatoly Karpov	FIDE World Chess Champion; 1985–93	Succeeded by Anatoly Karpov
Preceded by Anatoly Karpov	Classical World Chess Champion; 1985–2000	Succeeded by Vladimir Kramnik
Preceded by Peter Svidler	Russian Chess Champion; 2004	Succeeded by Sergei Rublevsky
Achievements
Preceded by Anatoly Karpov; Anatoly Karpov; Vladimir Kramnik	World No. 1; 1 January 1984 – 30 June 1985; 1 January 1986 – 31 December 1995; 1 July 1996 – 31 March 2006	Succeeded by Anatoly Karpov; Vladimir Kramnik; Veselin Topalov
