= Mig Greengard =

American chess author and journalist (born 1969)

Michael "Mig" Greengard (born 9 June 1969 in Northern California, USA) is an American chess author and journalist who lives in New York City. Greengard also maintains the official English website of the Russian pro-democracy coalition, The Other Russia.

== Journalism ==
Greengard's online column "Mig on Chess" appeared from 1997 to 1999 in The Week in Chess. He used to write columns for ChessBase and Chess Cafe. His chessninja.com website previously featured a popular chess blog, "The Daily Dirt", in which he had often passed on comments from Garry Kasparov. However, after some time of declining activity, the blog ceased in 2011, leaving room for Twitter as Greengard's preferred medium. He provides streaming audio commentary on major chess tournaments on Internet Chess Club's Chess.FM. He secured an important interview with Vladimir Kramnik on 16 December 2002. He was widely quoted as a commentator on the Garry Kasparov v X3D Fritz match in November 2003.

Greengard was vice president of content for Kasparov Chess Online and editor-in-chief of kasparovchess.com from 1999 until the site's demise in 2002.

Since 1999 Greengard has worked with former World Chess Champion Garry Kasparov including being the editor of the official English website of the party in which Kasparov is active, The Other Russia. He collaborated with Kasparov on his 2007 book How Life Imitates Chess and his 2017 book Deep Thinking, acting as his ghostwriter.

== Film ==
Greengard took part in the 2003 documentary film Game Over: Kasparov and the Machine.

== Award ==
The Chess Journalists of America named Greengard Chess Journalist of the Year for 2006-07.
