= 1989 in chess =

Events in chess in 1989.

== Top players ==
Kasparov and Karpov remained the top two players in the world, positions that they had held since July 1982. Over the year, English players Nigel Short and Jonathan Speelman moved up the list, whilst Dutch player Jan Timman fell out of the top 10, having stood third in the January 1988 list.

January 1989 FIDE rating list – Top 10 players
Elo	FIDE Top Ten Men	FIDE Top Ten Women	Elo
2775	Garry Kasparov (URS)	Judit Polgár (HUN)	2555
2750	Anatoly Karpov (URS)	Maia Chiburdanidze (URS)	2520
2650	Nigel Short (ENG)	Susan Polgar (HUN)	2510
2640	Alexander Beliavsky (URS)	Pia Cramling (SWE)	2480
2640	Jonathan Speelman (ENG)	Nana Ioseliani (URS)	2480
2635	Vassily Ivanchuk (URS)	Nona Gaprindashvili (URS)	2435
2630	Valery Salov (URS)	Elena Akhmilovskaya (URS)	2430
2625	Zoltán Ribli (HUN)	Irina Levitina (URS)	2400
2620	Ulf Andersson (SWE)	Anna Akhsharumova (USA)	2395
2620	John Nunn (ENG)	Ketevan Arakhamia (URS)	2395

== Events ==
The following major chess tournaments took place in 1989:

=== Grandmasters Association World Cup ===
The last three tournaments of the Grandmasters Association's World Cup were held in 1989, with some of the world's best players invited.

- 20 March - 20 April: The fourth tournament was held in Barcelona and won by Kasparov and Ljubomir Ljubojević, each with 11/16.
- 3 June - 24 June: The fifth tournament was held in Rotterdam and won by Timman with 10½/15, ahead of Karpov with 9½.
- 12 August - 3 September: The sixth and final tournament was held in Skellefteå, Sweden and won by Karpov and Kasparov, each with 9½/15. Kasparov won the World Cup series, and prize money of $175,000, with Karpov second.

=== European Team Championship ===
- 23 November - 3 December: The 9th European Team Chess Championship in Haifa was won by the USSR, ahead of Yugoslavia in second and West Germany in third.

The gold medal on the first board was won by Olivier Renet of France with 6/9. Valery Salov of USSR was second with 5/8.

=== Other major tournaments ===
- 18 February - 5 March: The Linares tournament was won by Ivanchuk with 7½/10, ahead of Karpov with 7.
- 9 September - 16 September: The 9th World Microcomputer Chess Championship was held in Portorož, Slovenia, and won by Mephisto X from the United Kingdom with 6½/7.
- 15 September - 2 October: The Tilburg tournament was dominated by Kasparov who won 10 games and drew only 4 to finish with 12/14. Viktor Korchnoi was second with 8½/14. This event took Kasparov's rating past Bobby Fischer's record of 2780.
- 28 December - 9 January 1990: The Reggio Emilia tournament was won by Jaan Ehlvest with 7½/10, ahead of Ivanchuk with 6½.
- The Wijk aan Zee tournament ended in a 4-way tie between Viswanathan Anand, Zoltán Ribli, Predrag Nikolić and Gyula Sax, each with 7½/13.

== Titles awarded ==
=== Grandmaster ===
In 1989, FIDE awarded the Grandmaster title to the following 17 players:

- Michael Adams (born 1971) England
- Evgeny Bareev (born 1966) Soviet Union
- Branko Damljanovic (born 1961) Yugoslavia
- Alexey Dreev (born 1961) Soviet Union
- Boris Gelfand (born 1968) Soviet Union
- Alon Greenfeld (born 1964) Israel
- Alexander Goldin (born 1965) United States
- Ferdinand Hellers (born 1969) Sweden
- Daniel King (born 1963) England
- Bachar Kouatly (born 1958) France
- Zdenko Kožul (born 1966) Yugoslavia
- Michał Krasenkow (born 1963) Poland
- Stefan Mohr (born 1967) Germany
- Jeroen Piket (born 1969) Netherlands
- Miodrag Todorcevic (born 1940) Yugoslavia
- Evgeny Vladimirov (born 1957) Soviet Union
- Alexey Vyzmanavin (born 1960) Soviet Union

=== Woman Grandmaster ===
In 1989, FIDE awarded the title Woman Grandmaster to the following 2 players:

- Anna Akhsharumova (born 1957) Soviet Union
- Zsofia Polgar (born 1974) Hungary

== Births ==
The following chess grandmasters were born in 1989:

- 19 January Maxim Rodshtein Israel
- 27 January Avetik Grigoryan Armenia
- 10 February Manuel León Hoyos Mexico
- 11 March Zaven Andriasian Armenia
- 28 March Sergei Zhigalko Belarus
- 29 March Geetha Narayanan Gopal India
- 6 April Robin Swinkels Netherlands
- 21 April Li Chao China
- 30 April Hrant Melkumyan Armenia
- 4 August Wang Hao China
- 28 August Aleksandr Rakhmanov Russia
- 4 November Axel Bachmann Paraguay
- 27 December Kateryna Lahno Ukraine
- Abhijeet Gupta India
- Eduardo Iturrizaga Venezuela
- Davit Jojua Georgia
- Rinat Jumabayev Kazakhstan
- Aleksandr Lenderman United States
- Michal Olszewski Poland
- Tornike Sanikidze Georgia
- Krisztián Szabó Hungary
- Daniele Vocaturo Italy

== Deaths ==
The following leading chess personalities died in 1989:

- 4 April Baruch Harold Wood (born 1909): founded British magazine CHESS in 1935
- 15 October Anatoly Lutikov (born 1933): Russian Grandmaster who finished third in the USSR Championships 1968-9
- Karen Grigorian (born 1947): Armenian International Master who was champion of Moscow in 1975 and 1979. Committed suicide by jumping from the tallest bridge in Yerevan

== Other events ==
The game between Ivan Nikolić and Goran Arsović in Belgrade 1989 lasted for over 20 hours and consisted of 269 moves. This is still the record number of moves played in a single tournament game. The game was eventually drawn.
