= Jüri Ehlvest =

Estonian writer (1967–2006)

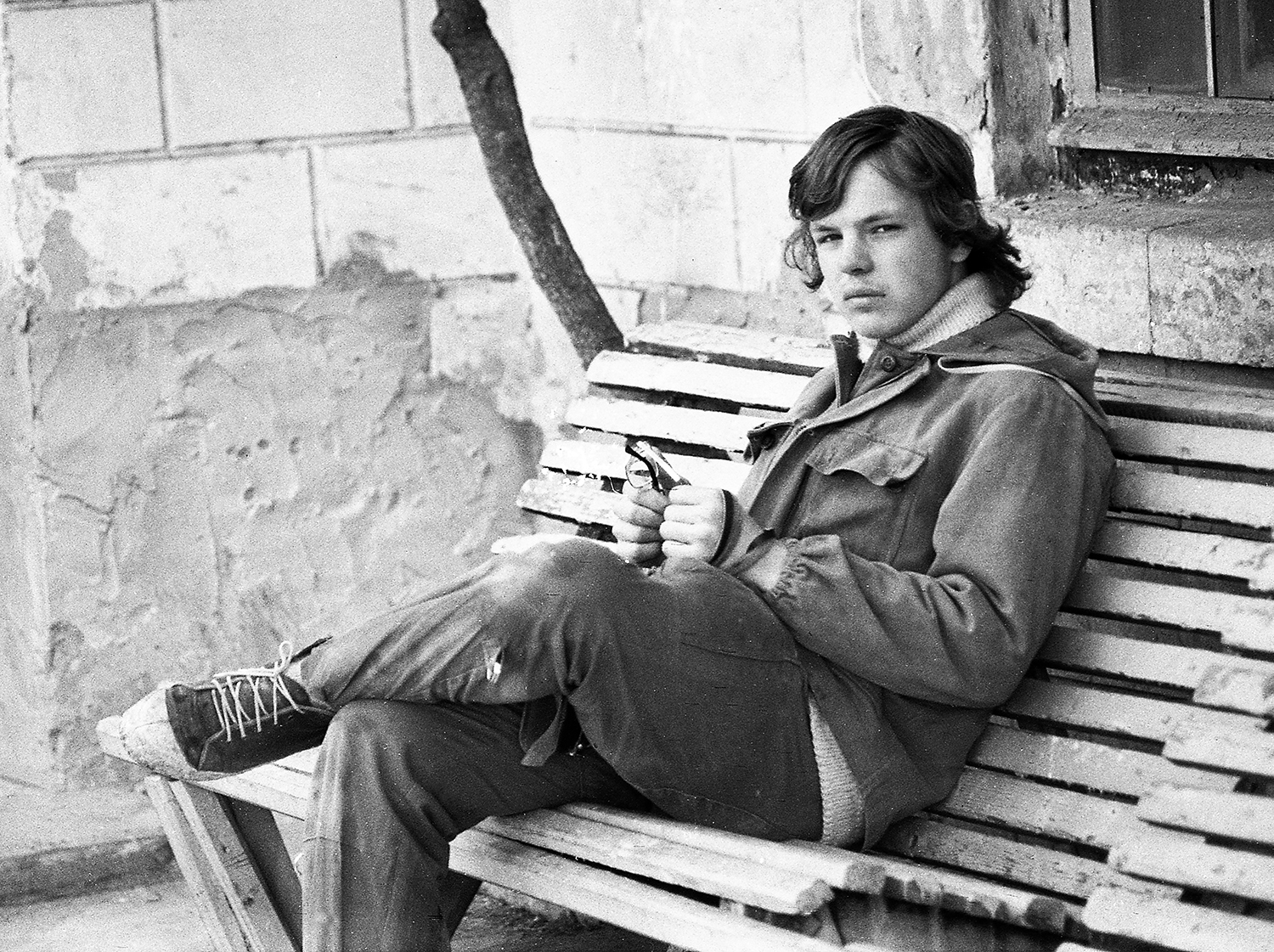
Jüri Ehlvest in 1985

Jüri Ehlvest (15 March 1967 Tallinn – 11 October 2006 New York City) was an Estonian writer. His brother is chess player Jaan Ehlvest. He studied in University of Tartu, taking courses in biology, theology and philosophy.

When living in Tartu, he was a member of three literary groups: Abi-Piirissaare Dalinistlik Kõõl (with Sven Kivisildnik), Estonian Kostabi Society, and Hirohall.

Ehlvest died in 2006 in New York, aged 39.

== Works ==
- 1996: short story Ikka veel Bagdadis (Still in Baghdad)
- 1996: short story collection Krutsiaania (Cruciania)
- 1997: short story Päkapikk kirjutab (The Gnome Writes)
- 2002: short story collection Hobune eikusagilt (A Horse from Nowhere)
