= Chess World Cup 1988–1989 =

1988–1989 chess tournament series

Chess World Cup
- 1988–1989
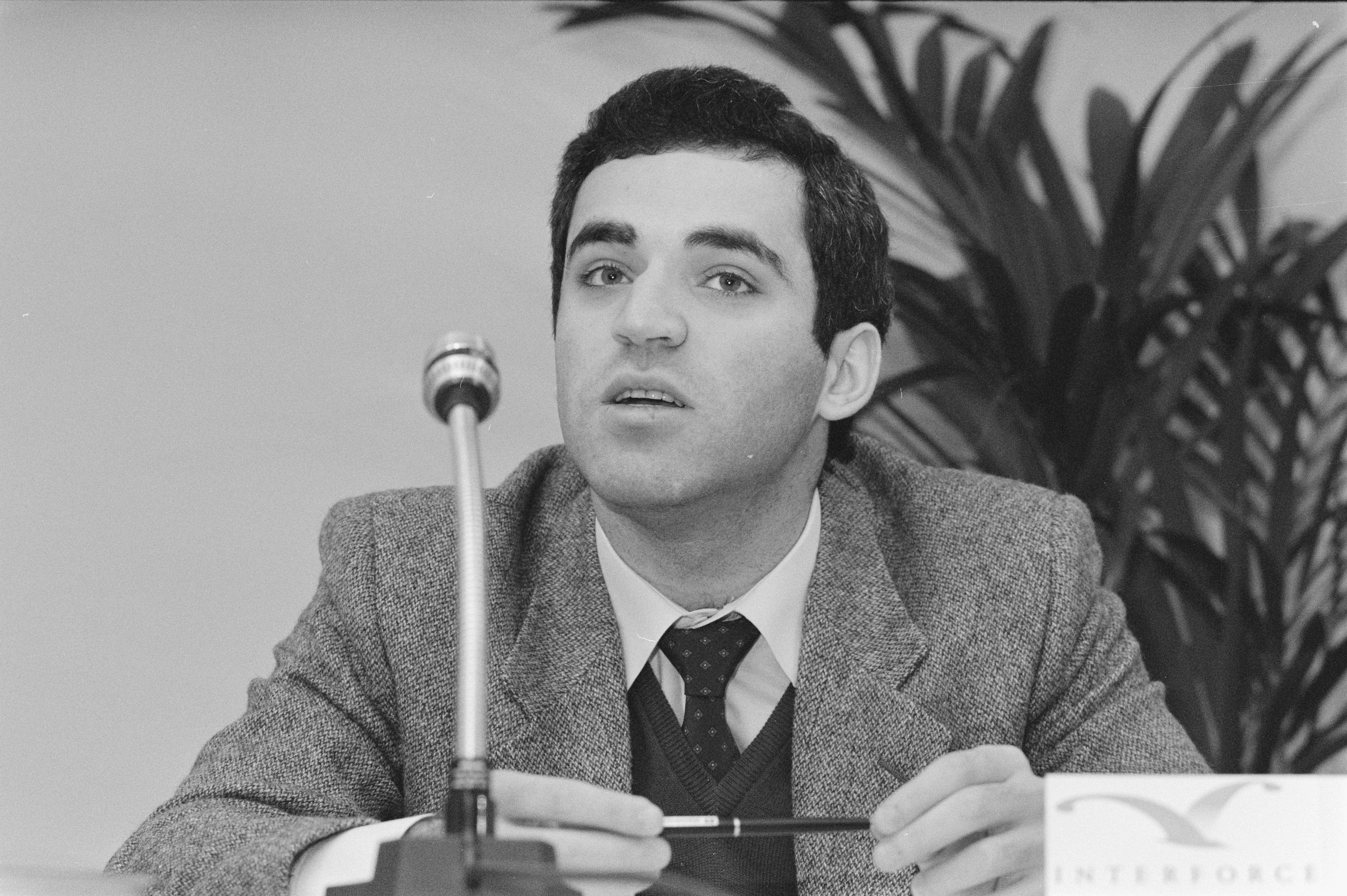
- World Cup winner Garry Kasparov

Tournament information
- Sport: Chess
- Location: Brussels; Belfort; Reykjavík; Barcelona; Rotterdam; Skellefteå
- Dates: 1 April 1988–3 September 1989
- Administrator: Grandmasters Association
- Format: Series of six round-robin tournaments

Final positions
- Champion: (Soviet Union) Garry Kasparov
- Runner-up: (Soviet Union) Anatoly Karpov

The Chess World Cup 1988–1989 was a series of six tournaments held between 1 April 1988 and 3 September 1989, to determine the winner of the World Cup Grand Prix. It was the first World Cup series organized by the Grandmasters Association (GMA), and the only one completed. Twenty-five players competed in the Grand Prix, and four local players also participated in one of the tournaments. The competition was won by Garry Kasparov, then World Chess Champion; Anatoly Karpov finished second. The top six finishers in the Grand Prix earned the right to play in the next edition of the World Cup, which was to be held in 1991–1992, but which was not completed.

The World Cup organized by the GMA is unrelated to the Chess World Cup organized by the International Chess Federation, which was next held in 2000.

== Background ==
A predecessor to the World Cup was held in Montreal in 1979. Originally organized as the "World Cup", its name was changed to "Man and his World Chess Challenge Cup" after the venue, Man and his World. It was a double round-robin tournament between ten grandmasters, and ran until 8 May. The prize fund of CA$110,000 (equivalent to $452,000 in 2025) was the highest of any chess tournament to that date. Anatoly Karpov and Mikhail Tal shared first place after drawing each other in the final round.

Discussions to organize a new World Cup began at the 27th Chess Olympiad in 1986, headed by Garry Kasparov, then World Champion. By 1987, the newly-formed Grandmasters Association (GMA)—which had six of the players from the 1979 tournament as directors and Kasparov as president—began organizing the 1988–1989 World Cup. It would be held as a series of six tournaments in Brussels, Bilbao, Reykjavík, Barcelona, Rotterdam, and Skellefteå; in early 1988, after the Brussels tournament had concluded, the Bilbao tournament was cancelled and Belfort replaced it as a host city.

Each event had its own prize fund, averaging US$100,000 (equivalent to $260,000 in 2025) per event; the GMA had an additional prize fund of $600,000 (equivalent to $1,558,000 in 2025) for the Grand Prix, with the winner receiving $100,000.

=== Qualification ===
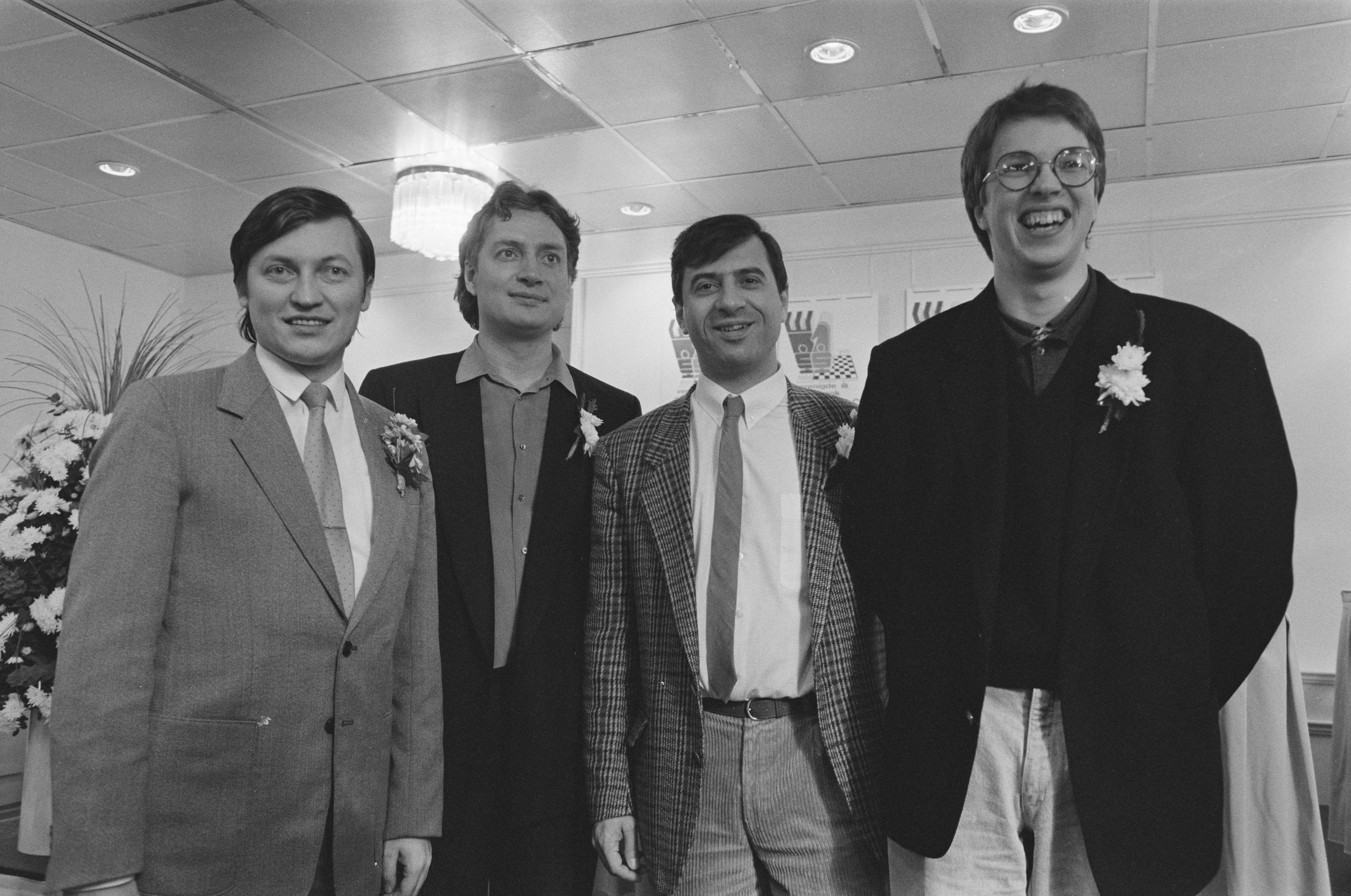
From left to right: Karpov, Timman, Ljubojević, and Short in 1988

Initially, twenty-four competitors were chosen. The World Chess Champion, Challenger, and top four finishers in the Candidates Tournament qualified; six more qualified from the FIDE average ratings list; and four qualified from each of the three 1987 Interzonal tournaments. Each nation was limited to eight players, excluding the World Champion; this limited the number of players from the Soviet Union to nine. Because of a four-way tie for fourth place in the Zagreb Interzonal, a play-off tournament was held between Jesús Nogueiras, Predrag Nikolić, and Julio Granda to qualify as reserve in the Candidates, which Nikolić won. However, a World Cup rule for qualification said the tie should be broken by greatest number of games as Black, followed by the Sonneborn–Berger score; this would allow Nogeuiras to qualify. The GMA invited both Nikolić and Nogueiras to the World Cup, and four of the six tournaments were expanded from 16 to 18 players, with local players filling the extra spot.

Participants by nation and qualification method
Player	Nation	Qualification method
Garry Kasparov	Soviet Union	Winner of the 1987 World Chess Championship match
Anatoly Karpov	Soviet Union	Winner of the 1987 Challenger Match
Artur Yusupov	Soviet Union	Top four finishers in the 1985 Candidates Tournament
Rafael Vaganian	Soviet Union	Top four finishers in the 1985 Candidates Tournament
Andrei Sokolov	Soviet Union	Top four finishers in the 1985 Candidates Tournament
Jan Timman	Netherlands	Top four finishers in the 1985 Candidates Tournament
Gyula Sax	Hungary	Top four finishers in the 1987 Interzonal tournament in Subotica
Nigel Short	England	Top four finishers in the 1987 Interzonal tournament in Subotica
Jon Speelman	England	Top four finishers in the 1987 Interzonal tournament in Subotica
Mikhail Tal	Soviet Union	Top four finishers in the 1987 Interzonal tournament in Subotica
Valery Salov	Soviet Union	Top four finishers in the 1987 Interzonal tournament in Szirák
Jóhann Hjartarson	Iceland	Top four finishers in the 1987 Interzonal tournament in Szirák
Lajos Portisch	Hungary	Top four finishers in the 1987 Interzonal tournament in Szirák
John Nunn	England	Top four finishers in the 1987 Interzonal tournament in Szirák
Viktor Korchnoi	Switzerland	Top four finishers in the 1987 Interzonal tournament in Zagreb, after tiebreaks
Jaan Ehlvest	Soviet Union	Top four finishers in the 1987 Interzonal tournament in Zagreb, after tiebreaks
Yasser Seirawan	United States	Top four finishers in the 1987 Interzonal tournament in Zagreb, after tiebreaks
Jesús Nogueiras	Cuba	Top four finishers in the 1987 Interzonal tournament in Zagreb, after tiebreaks
Predrag Nikolić	Yugoslavia	Winner of playoff match in Havana
Ulf Andersson	Sweden	Average ratings list
Alexander Beliavsky	Soviet Union	Average ratings list
Robert Hübner	West Germany	Average ratings list
Ljubomir Ljubojević	Yugoslavia	Average ratings list
Zoltán Ribli	Hungary	Average ratings list
Boris Spassky	France	Average ratings list

== Format ==
The World Cup was held as a series of six round-robin tournaments; each of the participants would compete in four out of six. Belfort and Skellefteå were held as 16-player tournaments; the others were organized as 18-player tournaments, with 17 World Cup players and one local player. The six tournaments each had their own prize funds, for which the local players were also eligible.

The participants also competed in the World Cup Grand Prix. In each event, players gained Grand Prix points based on performance: this was the sum of points scored in the tournament, plus points for placement, from 17 points for the winner descending to one point for the 17th place finisher. Only games played against other World Cup participants counted; games against local players were ignored for the purpose of Grand Prix points. Each event was treated as if it were 16 rounds against other participants; games not played, because of withdrawals or too few players, each counted as one-half point. The final results counted the top three out of four performances, dropping the lowest. The top six finishers automatically qualified for the next planned World Cup cycle in 1991–1992. In the event of a tie for sixth place, a playoff would have been held.

== Tournament results ==
=== Brussels ===
The first tournament was held 1–22 April 1988 in Brussels, sponsored by SWIFT. In addition to 17 World Cup participants, Luc Winants joined the tournament as a local player. Rafael Vaganian withdrew from the tournament after the death of his brother. Karpov's win against Jan Timman in round six won two brilliancy prizes. As entertainment, Karpov and Timman played a human chess game at the Grand-Place; it ended in a draw after 20 moves.

April 1988, Brussels
No.	Player	Rating	Score vs. player in Nth place																		Total	Grand Prix points
No.	Player	Rating	1	2	3	4	5	6	7	8	9	10	11	12	13	14	15	16	17	18	Total	Grand Prix points
1	Anatoly Karpov (USSR)	2715	-	½	1	0	½	½	½	1	1	½	½	1	½	1	1	½	1	-	11	27.5
2	Valery Salov (USSR)	2595	½	-	1	1	½	½	½	½	½	½	½	½	1	½	½	½	1	-	10	25
3	Ljubomir Ljubojević (YUG)	2610	0	0	-	½	1	½	1	½	1	½	½	1	1	½	½	½	½	-	9½	25
4	Alexander Beliavsky (USSR)	2645	1	0	½	-	0	½	½	½	½	1	½	½	1	1	½	½	1	-	9½	22
5	John Nunn (ENG)	2615	½	½	0	1	-	½	½	½	½	1	½	½	½	½	½	1	1	-	9½	22
6	Ulf Andersson (SWE)	2605	½	½	½	½	½	-	½	½	½	½	½	½	1	½	1	½	½	½	9	22
7	Lajos Portisch (HUN)	2610	½	½	0	½	½	½	-	½	0	½	1	1	½	½	½	1	1	½	9	19.5
8	Jon Speelman (ENG)	2625	0	½	½	½	½	½	½	-	1	½	½	½	½	½	1	0	1	-	8½	18
9	Andrei Sokolov (USSR)	2595	0	½	0	½	½	½	1	0	-	0	1	½	½	½	½	1	1	-	8	16
10	Mikhail Tal (USSR)	2630	½	½	½	0	0	½	½	½	1	-	½	0	0	1	½	1	½	½	7½	16
11	Predrag Nikolić (YUG)	2630	½	½	½	½	½	½	0	½	0	½	-	½	½	0	1	½	1	-	7½	13
12	Jan Timman (NED)	2675	0	½	0	½	½	½	0	½	½	1	½	-	½	½	0	1	1	½	7½	13
13	Yasser Seirawan (USA)	2595	½	0	0	0	½	0	½	½	½	1	½	½	-	½	1	½	1	-	7½	13
14	Jesús Nogueiras (CUB)	2560	0	½	0	½	½	½	½	½	½	0	1	½	½	-	0	½	1	-	7	10
15	Viktor Korchnoi (SWI)	2560	0	½	½	½	½	0	½	0	½	½	0	1	0	1	-	0	1	-	6½	8
16	Gyula Sax (HUN)	2610	½	½	½	½	0	½	0	1	0	0	½	0	½	½	1	-	0	-	6	10
17	Luc Winants (BEL)	2465	0	0	½	0	0	½	0	0	0	½	0	0	0	0	0	1	-	-	2½	-
18	Rafael Vaganian (USSR)	2625	-	-	-	-	-	½	½	-	-	½	-	½	-	-	-	-	-	-	-	-

=== Belfort ===
The second tournament was held in Belfort from 10 June to 3 July 1988. Karpov's win against Kasparov was characterized by Robert Byrne as vengeance for the European Options Exchange Match-Tournament in May, where Karpov lost two out of four games against Kasparov. By round eight, Ehlvest was in the lead, but placed third after losing to both Karpov and Kasparov in later rounds. Lubomir Kavalek said the poor showing of Hjartarson, Yusupov, and Timman was surprising, as they had won the preliminary matches of the Candidates Tournament that year.

June–July 1988, Belfort
No.	Player	Rating	Score vs. player in Nth place																Score	Grand Prix points
No.	Player	Rating	1	2	3	4	5	6	7	8	9	10	11	12	13	14	15	16	Score	Grand Prix points
1	Garry Kasparov (USSR)	2750	-	0	1	½	½	1	½	1	½	1	1	1	1	½	1	1	11½	29
2	Anatoly Karpov (USSR)	2715	1	-	1	½	½	0	1	½	½	½	½	1	1	1	½	1	10½	27
3	Jaan Ehlvest (USSR)	2585	0	0	-	½	½	½	½	½	1	½	1	½	1	1	½	1	9	24.5
4	Zoltán Ribli (HUN)	2620	½	½	½	-	½	½	½	½	1	½	½	½	½	½	½	½	8	21
5	Robert Hübner (FRG)	2595	½	½	½	½	-	½	½	½	½	0	½	1	½	½	½	1	8	21
6	Andrei Sokolov (USSR)	2595	0	1	½	½	½	-	½	½	½	1	½	0	½	½	½	1	8	21
7	Boris Spassky (FRA)	2565	½	0	½	½	½	½	-	½	½	½	½	½	½	1	1	½	8	21
8	Nigel Short (ENG)	2630	0	½	½	½	½	½	½	-	½	1	½	½	½	0	1	½	7½	18
9	Jon Speelman (ENG)	2625	½	½	0	0	½	½	½	½	-	½	½	½	½	½	½	1	7	16.5
10	Ljubomir Ljubojević (YUG)	2610	0	½	½	½	1	0	½	0	½	-	½	½	½	½	½	½	6½	13.5
11	Ulf Andersson (SWE)	2605	0	½	0	½	½	½	½	½	½	½	-	½	½	0	½	1	6½	13.5
12	Jesús Nogueiras (CUB)	2560	0	0	½	½	0	1	½	½	½	½	½	-	½	1	½	0	6½	13.5
13	Alexander Beliavsky (USSR)	2645	0	0	0	½	½	½	½	½	½	½	½	½	-	1	1	0	6½	13.5
14	Jóhann Hjartarson (ISL)	2595	½	0	0	½	½	½	0	1	½	½	1	0	0	-	½	0	5½	9
15	Artur Yusupov (USSR)	2620	0	½	½	½	½	½	0	0	½	½	½	½	0	½	-	½	5½	9
16	Jan Timman (NED)	2675	0	0	0	½	0	0	½	½	0	½	0	1	1	1	½	-	5½	9

=== Reykjavík ===
The third tournament was held at the City Theatre in Reykjavík from 3 to 24 October 1988, and was sponsored by Stöð 2. Margeir Pétursson took part as a local participant. Tal took the lead in round six, joined by Beliavsky in round ten and Ehlvest in round eleven for a three-way tie. After three consecutive wins, Kasparov went into the last round tied with Beliavsky; after Spassky won against Beliavsky by sacrificing a knight, Kasparov drew Nikolić to win his second World Cup tournament.

Kasparov lost against Sokolov in round seven after blundering his queen on the 37th move, which was characterized then by chess columnist Robert Byrne as "one of the worst blunders of his career". The game between Hjartarson and Kasparov drew an audience of at least 700 spectators. The points from this tournament put Kasparov in the Grand Prix lead, with 56.5 points ahead of Karpov's 54.5.

October 1988, Reykjavík
No.	Player	Rating	Score vs. player in Nth place																		Score	Grand Prix points
No.	Player	Rating	1	2	3	4	5	6	7	8	9	10	11	12	13	14	15	16	17	18	Score	Grand Prix points
1	Garry Kasparov (USSR)	2760	-	½	½	1	1	½	1	1	½	½	1	0	½	½	½	½	1	½	11	27.5
2	Alexander Beliavsky (USSR)	2665	½	-	1	½	1	0	½	½	1	½	½	½	1	½	1	0	½	1	10½	25
3	Mikhail Tal (USSR)	2610	½	0	-	½	½	½	½	1	½	1	½	½	½	1	1	½	½	½	10	25
4	Jóhann Hjartarson (ISL)	2610	0	½	½	-	½	½	½	1	½	½	½	0	1	½	0	1	1	1	9½	20.5
5	Jaan Ehlvest (USSR)	2580	0	0	½	½	-	½	0	1	½	1	½	½	1	½	½	1	½	1	9½	20.5
6	Artur Yusupov (USSR)	2620	½	1	½	½	½	-	½	½	½	½	½	½	0	½	½	1	½	½	9	20.5
7	Gyula Sax (HUN)	2600	0	½	½	½	1	½	-	½	½	½	½	1	½	½	0	½	1	½	9	20.5
8	Jan Timman (NED)	2660	0	½	0	0	0	½	½	-	½	½	1	1	1	½	½	½	1	1	9	16.5
9	John Nunn (ENG)	2620	½	0	½	½	½	½	½	½	-	½	½	½	½	½	1	½	1	0	8½	20.5
10	Jon Speelman (ENG)	2645	½	½	0	½	0	½	½	½	½	-	½	½	½	1	½	½	1	½	8½	16.5
11	Ulf Andersson (SWE)	2625	0	½	½	½	½	½	½	0	½	½	-	1	½	½	½	½	½	1	8½	14
12	Andrei Sokolov (USSR)	2600	1	½	½	1	½	½	0	0	½	½	0	-	0	½	½	½	½	1	8	11
13	Predrag Nikolić (YUG)	2585	½	0	½	0	0	1	½	0	½	½	½	1	-	½	½	½	1	½	8	14
14	Zoltán Ribli (HUN)	2630	½	½	0	½	½	½	½	½	½	0	½	½	½	-	½	½	0	1	7½	8.5
15	Lajos Portisch (HUN)	2630	½	0	0	1	½	½	1	½	0	½	½	½	½	½	-	½	0	0	7	11
16	Boris Spassky (FRA)	2560	½	1	½	0	0	0	½	½	½	½	½	½	½	½	½	-	½	0	7	11
17	Viktor Korchnoi (SWI)	2595	0	½	½	0	½	½	0	0	0	0	½	½	0	1	1	½	-	1	6½	6.5
18	Margeir Pétursson (ISL)	2530	½	0	½	0	0	½	½	0	1	½	0	0	½	0	1	1	0	-	6	-

=== Barcelona ===
The fourth tournament was held from 30 March to 20 April 1989 at the Saló del Tinell in the Palau Reial Major in Barcelona. Tal was unable to play due to illness. Going into the last round, Ljubojević was a half-point ahead of Kasparov, holding the lead from the fourth round. However, after Ljubojević took a ten-move draw with Short in the final game, Kasparov won against Spassky to match Ljubojević's score. Considering tiebreaks, Kasparov took first place, while Ljubojević earned more Grand Prix points having performed better against the non-local players. The final-round game was the first time Kasparov had won against Spassky, himself a former world champion.

March–April 1989, Barcelona
No.	Player	Rating	Score vs. player in Nth place																	Score	World cup points
No.	Player	Rating	1	2	3	4	5	6	7	8	9	10	11	12	13	14	15	16	17	Score	World cup points
1	Garry Kasparov (USSR)	2775	-	½	1	1	½	1	½	½	0	½	1	1	1	½	½	1	½	11	26.5
2	Ljubomir Ljubojević (YUG)	2580	½	-	½	½	½	½	½	1	½	½	½	1	1	1	1	½	1	11	28
3	Valery Salov (USSR)	2630	0	½	-	½	1	1	½	0	1	½	½	½	1	0	1	1	1	11	23.5
4	Viktor Korchnoi (SWI)	2610	0	½	½	-	0	½	1	½	½	1	½	1	1	1	1	0	½	9½	25
5	Robert Hübner (FRG)	2600	½	½	0	1	-	½	1	½	½	½	½	½	½	1	½	½	½	9	22
6	Nigel Short (ENG)	2650	0	½	0	½	½	-	½	1	1	1	½	½	0	0	1	1	1	9	20.5
7	Predrag Nikolić (YUG)	2605	½	½	½	0	0	½	-	½	½	½	½	½	½	½	½	1	1	8	16.5
8	Rafael Vaganian (USSR)	2600	½	0	1	½	½	0	½	-	1	½	½	½	½	0	½	0	1	7½	19
9	Artur Yusupov (USSR)	2610	1	½	0	½	½	0	½	0	-	½	½	½	½	½	½	1	½	7½	13.5
10	Zoltán Ribli (HUN)	2625	½	½	½	0	½	0	½	½	½	-	½	1	½	½	½	½	½	7½	16.5
11	Boris Spassky (FRA)	2580	0	½	½	½	½	½	½	½	½	½	-	0	½	½	½	1	½	7½	13.5
12	Alexander Beliavsky (USSR)	2640	0	0	½	0	½	½	½	½	½	0	1	-	1	1	1	½	0	7½	16.5
13	Jon Speelman (ENG)	2640	0	0	0	0	½	1	½	½	½	½	½	0	-	½	½	1	1	7	10.5
14	Jóhann Hjartarson (ISL)	2615	½	0	1	0	0	1	½	1	½	½	½	0	½	-	0	½	0	6½	10.5
15	Yasser Seirawan (USA)	2610	½	0	0	0	½	0	½	½	½	½	½	0	½	1	-	½	1	6½	10.5
16	Miguel Illescas (ESP)	2525	0	½	0	1	½	0	0	1	0	½	0	½	0	½	½	-	½	5½	-
17	Jesús Nogueiras (CUB)	2575	½	0	0	½	½	0	0	0	½	½	½	1	0	1	0	½	-	5½	7.5

=== Rotterdam ===
The fifth tournament was held 3–24 June 1989 in Rotterdam, a venue suggested by Timman. It was sponsored by SWIFT and PTT Telecom. Spassky decided not to participate despite being scheduled to play, and Hübner withdrew due to illness after a first-round draw with Nogueiras. Vaganian and Salov also fell ill, causing some games to be postponed, but were able to continue after recovery. John van der Wiel participated as a local player. Karpov, who had been in the lead, lost his final three games; Timman, who had been one point behind Karpov, finished with two wins and a bye to take first place in the tournament.

June 1989, Rotterdam
No.	Player	Rating	Score vs. player in Nth place																Score	Grand Prix points
No.	Player	Rating	1	2	3	4	5	6	7	8	9	10	11	12	13	14	15	16	Score	Grand Prix points
1	Jan Timman (NED)	2610	-	0	½	1	½	1	½	1	1	1	½	1	½	½	½	1	10½	28
2	Anatoly Karpov (USSR)	2750	1	-	½	0	½	0	½	½	½	1	1	1	1	0	1	1	9½	26
3	Rafael Vaganian (USSR)	2600	½	½	-	½	1	½	½	½	½	1	0	1	1	½	½	½	9	23
4	John Nunn (ENG)	2620	0	1	½	-	½	½	½	½	½	½	½	½	½	1	½	1	8½	23
5	John van der Wiel (NED)	2560	½	½	0	½	-	0	1	½	1	½	½	½	½	½	1	½	8	-
6	Valery Salov (USSR)	2630	0	1	½	½	1	-	0	½	1	0	1	½	0	½	½	1	8	18
7	Jaan Ehlvest (USSR)	2600	½	½	½	½	0	1	-	½	0	½	1	0	½	1	½	1	8	23
8	Andrei Sokolov (USSR)	2605	0	½	½	½	½	½	½	-	0	½	½	½	1	½	1	1	8	20
9	Nigel Short (ENG)	2650	0	½	½	½	0	0	1	1	-	1	½	0	1	½	½	½	7½	20
10	Yasser Seirawan (USA)	2610	0	0	0	½	½	1	½	½	0	-	½	½	½	1	1	½	7	16.5
11	Gyula Sax (HUN)	2610	½	0	1	½	½	0	0	½	½	½	-	½	½	½	½	½	6½	13.5
12	Jesús Nogueiras (CUB)	2575	0	0	0	½	½	½	1	½	1	½	½	-	½	½	0	½	6½	13.5
13	Artur Yusupov (USSR)	2610	½	0	0	½	½	1	½	0	0	½	½	½	-	1	½	½	6½	13.5
14	Ljubomir Ljubojević (YUG)	2580	½	1	½	0	½	½	0	½	½	0	½	½	0	-	½	½	6	10.5
15	Lajos Portisch (HUN)	2610	½	0	½	½	0	½	½	0	½	0	½	1	½	½	-	½	6	13.5
16	Jóhann Hjartarson (ISL)	2615	0	0	½	0	½	0	0	0	½	½	½	½	½	½	½	-	4½	8

=== Skellefteå ===
The final tournament was held from 12 August to 3 September 1989 in Skellefteå, sponsored by Expolaris. Heading into the tournament, Kasparov and Karpov were guaranteed the first two spots in Grand Prix standings. Karpov needed to take first in Skellefteå with a score of 10½ points to surpass Kasparov in the Grand Prix. He did not accomplish this, and did not win a game until round six. After eight rounds, there was a five-way tie for the lead, between Karpov, Kasparov, Ehlvest, Salov, and Portisch. With three rounds left, Kasparov secured first place in the Grand Prix, as it was impossible for Karpov to earn enough points to catch up. Two concert performances of the musical Chess were held at the end of the event; the prize-giving ceremony was held at the end of the second concert.

August–September 1989, Skellefteå
No.	Player	Rating	Score vs. player in Nth place																Score	Grand Prix points
No.	Player	Rating	1	2	3	4	5	6	7	8	9	10	11	12	13	14	15	16	Score	Grand Prix points
1	Anatoly Karpov (USSR)	2755	-	½	½	1	½	½	½	½	1	½	½	½	1	1	½	½	9½	26.5
2	Garry Kasparov (USSR)	2775	½	-	1	½	1	½	½	½	½	½	½	½	½	½	1	1	9½	26.5
3	Lajos Portisch (HUN)	2600	½	0	-	½	½	1	1	0	½	½	½	1	1	0	1	½	8½	23
4	Yasser Seirawan (USA)	2585	0	½	½	-	½	½	½	½	1	1	½	½	½	½	1	½	8½	23
5	Nigel Short (ENG)	2660	½	0	½	½	-	1	½	½	½	0	1	½	½	1	½	1	8½	23
6	Valery Salov (USSR)	2645	½	½	0	½	0	-	1	½	½	½	½	½	1	1	1	0	8	20
7	Gyula Sax (HUN)	2580	½	½	0	½	½	0	-	1	½	½	½	½	1	½	1	½	8	20
8	John Nunn (ENG)	2575	½	½	1	½	½	½	0	-	0	0	½	½	1	½	½	1	7½	17.5
9	Ulf Andersson (SWE)	2635	0	½	½	0	½	½	½	1	-	½	½	½	½	½	½	1	7½	17.5
10	Robert Hübner (FRG)	2605	½	½	½	0	1	½	½	1	½	-	½	½	0	½	0	½	7	14.5
11	Mikhail Tal (USSR)	2585	½	½	½	½	0	½	½	½	½	½	-	½	½	½	½	½	7	14.5
12	Zoltán Ribli (HUN)	2605	½	½	0	½	½	½	½	½	½	½	½	-	½	½	½	½	7	14.5
13	Jaan Ehlvest (USSR)	2620	0	½	0	½	½	0	0	0	½	1	½	½	-	½	1	1	6½	12
14	Predrag Nikolić (YUG)	2600	0	½	1	½	0	0	½	½	½	½	½	½	½	-	0	½	6	10
15	Viktor Korchnoi (SWI)	2655	½	0	0	0	½	0	0	½	½	1	½	½	0	1	-	1	6	10
16	Rafael Vaganian (USSR)	2585	½	0	½	½	0	1	½	0	0	½	½	½	0	½	0	-	5	7.5

== Grand Prix standings ==
The World Cup Grand Prix was won by Kasparov, followed by Karpov two points behind. Salov, Ehlvest, Ljubojević, and Nunn took the following four places, and qualified for the next World Cup cycle in 1991–1992.

Grand Prix results
No.	Player	Brussels	Belfort	Reykjavik	Barcelona	Rotterdam	Skellefteå	Total (Note: Scores in parentheses are not included in the total, as the worst performance of each player was dropped.)
1	Garry Kasparov (USSR)	-	29	27.5	26.5	-	(26.5)	83
2	Anatoly Karpov (USSR)	27.5	27	-	-	(26)	26.5	81
3	Valery Salov (USSR)	25	-	-	23.5	(18)	20	68.5
4	Jaan Ehlvest (USSR)	-	24.5	20.5	-	23	(12)	68
5	Ljubomir Ljubojević (YUG)	25	13.5	-	28	(10.5)	-	66.5
6	John Nunn (ENG)	22	-	20.5	-	23	(17.5)	65.5
7	Alexander Beliavsky (USSR)	22	(13.5)	25	16.5	-	-	63.5
7 (Note: Beliavsky and Short tied for seventh place in the Grand Prix standings; Hübner and Timman tied for ninth.)	Nigel Short (ENG)	-	(18)	-	20.5	20	23	63.5
9	Robert Hübner (FRG)	-	21	-	22	(W) (Note: Withdrew from tournament)	14.5	57.5
9	Jan Timman (NED)	13	(9)	16.5	-	28	-	57.5
11	Andrei Sokolov (USSR)	16	21	(11)	-	20	-	57
12	Lajos Portisch (HUN)	19.5	-	(11)	-	13.5	23	56
13	Mikhail Tal (USSR)	16	-	25	(W)	-	14.5	55.5
14	Gyula Sax (HUN)	(10)	-	20.5	-	13.5	20	54
15	Ulf Andersson (SWE)	22	(13.5)	14	-	-	17.5	53.5
16	Yasser Seirawan (USA)	13	-	-	(10.5)	16.5	23	52.5
17	Zoltán Ribli (HUN)	-	21	(8.5)	16.5	-	14.5	52
18	Jon Speelman (ENG)	18	16.5	16.5	-	(10.5)	-	51
19	Rafael Vaganian (USSR)	(W)	-	-	19	23	7.5	49.5
20	Artur Yusupov (USSR)	-	(9)	20.5	13.5	13.5	-	47.5
21	Boris Spassky (FRA)	-	21	11	13.5	(W)	-	45.5
22	Predrag Nikolić (YUG)	13	-	14	16.5	-	(10)	43.5
23	Viktor Korchnoi (SWI)	8	-	(6.5)	25	-	10	43
24	Jóhann Hjartarson (ISL)	-	9	20.5	10.5	(9)	-	40
25	Jesús Nogueiras (CUB)	10	13.5	-	(7.5)	13.5	-	37

== See also ==
- Chess World Cup
- FIDE Grand Prix
- World Chess Championship 1990

== Bibliography ==
- Kavalek, Lubomir (1990). World Cup Chess: The Grand Masters' Grand Prix. North Pomfret, Vermont: Trafalgar Square Publishing. ISBN 0-943955-31-9.
