= Andrei Sokolov (Russian chess player) =

Russian-French chess grandmaster (born 1963)

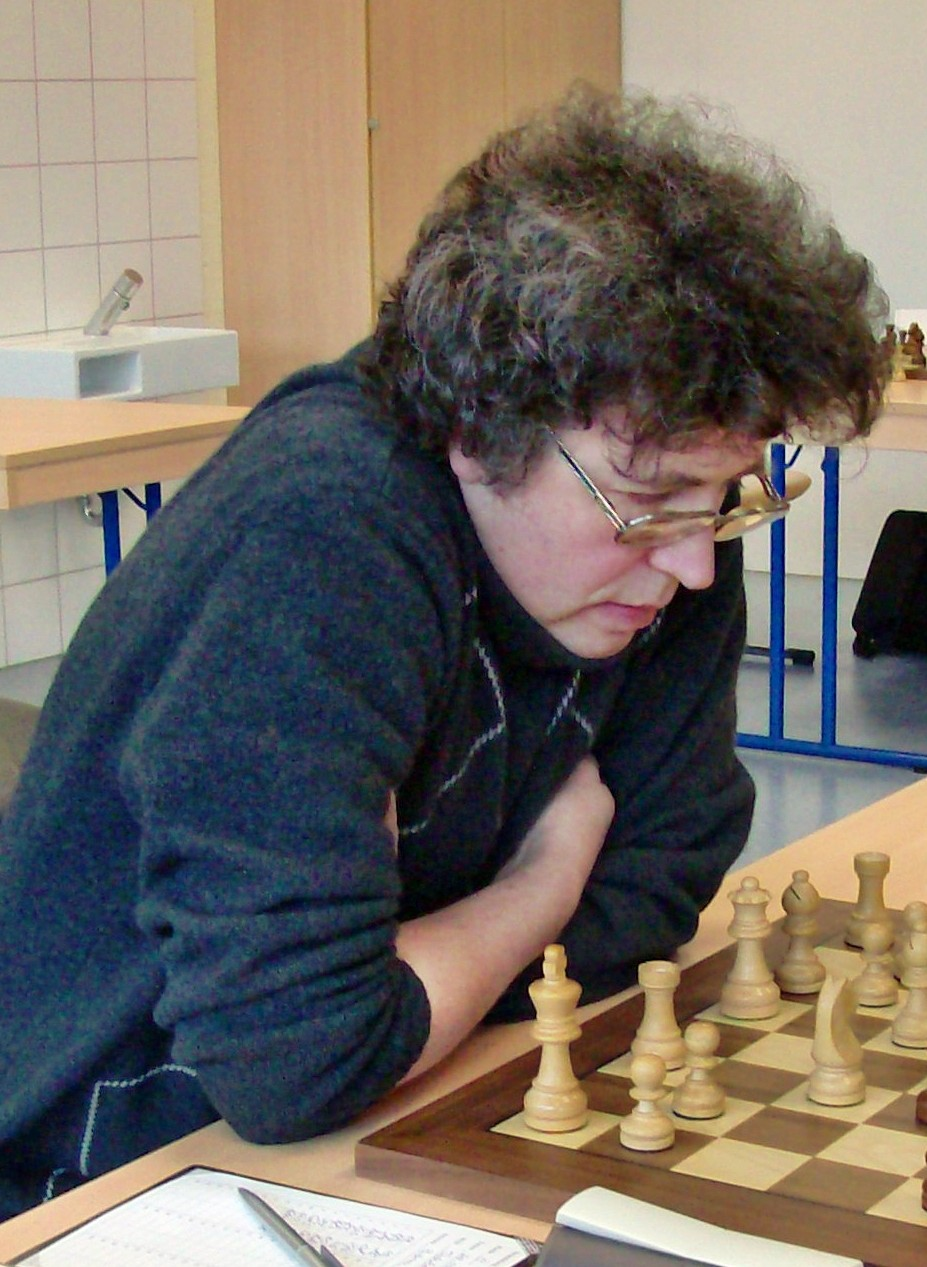
- Andrei Sokolov, 2008

Personal information
- Born: Andrei Yurievich Sokolov; 20 March 1963 (age 63) Vorkuta, Russian SFSR, Soviet Union

Chess career
- Country: Soviet Union (until 1991); Russia (1992–2000); France (since 2000)
- Title: Grandmaster (1984)
- FIDE rating: 2445 (November 2026)
- Peak rating: 2645 (January 1987)
- Peak ranking: No. 4 (January 1987)

Andrei Yurievich Sokolov (Russian: Андре́й Ю́рьевич Соколо́в; romanized: Andrey Yur'yevich Sokolov; born 20 March 1963, in Vorkuta, Komi ASSR, Russian SFSR, Soviet Union) is a Russian chess Grandmaster living in and playing for France. He was one of the leading players in the world in the late 1980s.

== Formative years ==
He learned the game from his father Yuri, a Soviet Army officer and Candidate Master. At 6 years old, inspiration arrived in the form of a book of Alekhine's games. At age 12, he attended one of the many chess schools that existed in and around Moscow and he occasionally frequented the legendary Pioneer Palace. Some major preparation followed in the years 1975–1982, mainly under the tutelage of renowned coach Vladimir Yurkov.

Alexey Suetin attended the same sports club (Trud) and as senior Moscow coach, observed the youngster's progress closely. Sokolov won the minor championship of Moscow in 1981, but fared less well in the major Open Championship a short while later. He had yet to learn the subtleties of positional play, but already there was much to admire. Suetin described him as "a practical-minded chess player ... most concentrated, deprived of any impulsiveness and very persistent in attaining his aims."

== Career ==
By 1982, the groundwork was paying off as he went on to win the Junior World Chess Championship, held in Copenhagen. A strong entry had included Joel Benjamin, Iván Morovic, Nigel Short and Niaz Murshed. At this time, Sokolov was an International Master with an Elo rating of 2450. At that time, FIDE automatically awarded the International Master title to the winner of the Junior Championship. (Later the rule would be changed to make the Junior Champion a grandmaster.) His Grandmaster status was achieved in 1984, a year of outstanding achievement for the 21-year-old as he rocked the chess world by winning the Championship of the Soviet Union at his first attempt. Impressive was his penultimate round effort against ex-champion Beliavsky who, playing white, quickly mounted a ferocious attack against Black's king position. It was however already a quality of Sokolov that he remain ice-cool under pressure. He not only repelled the attack, but launched a counter-offensive of his own and won a crucial game. It was also a year that saw him finish a creditable second at the strong Novi Sad tournament and advance his Elo rating up to 2550.

Representing the Soviet Union at the Thessaloniki 1984 and Dubai 1986 Chess Olympiads, his performances were assured, scoring close to 67% on each occasion and contributing to two team gold medals.

Sokolov's career highlight was the 1987 World Championship cycle, where he reached the final of the Candidates Tournament. After qualifying through the Interzonal and round-robin Candidates Tournament, he won matches against Rafael Vaganian (6–2), and Artur Yusupov (7½–6½). In the final however, he lost to Anatoly Karpov, 3½–7½. Having beaten Karpov at Bugojno 1986, he felt that his pre-match mood had been overly optimistic and he described his defeat as "very severe".

Nevertheless, in January 1987 his rating peaked at 2645 and he was listed as the fourth strongest player in the world (behind Kasparov, Anatoly Karpov and Yusupov; he had the same rating as Yusupov but was behind him on countback due to fewer games played). He even went on to defeat Karpov again at Belfort 1988, a World Cup event.

However, he was unable to repeat his success in later World Championship cycles. In the 1988 Candidates' matches, he unexpectedly lost his first-round match to Kevin Spraggett. In the 1990 Interzonal he scored 6½ out of 13, failing to qualified for the Candidates.

Exceptionally, in 1990, he scored a resurgent win at the Moscow Open (finishing ahead of Mikhail Tal, Rafael Vaganian, Alexey Vyzmanavin and Mikhail Krasenkov, among others). This preceded a period of lesser chess activity.

== Move to France ==
He moved to France and acquired French nationality in 2000. While he has not yet won the French Championship, he came close in 2003 when he tied first with Joël Lautier and Étienne Bacrot, losing out to Bacrot in a playoff. In 2005, he finished equal second with 14-year-old Maxime Vachier-Lagrave, behind Lautier.

There have been two appearances for the French Olympiad team (in 2002 and 2006) and he further represented his adopted country at the European Team Chess Championship of 2003, held in Plovdiv.

== Notable games ==
Sokolov vs. Portisch, Brussels 1988

Position: a8 black rook, e8 black rook, f8 black bishop, g8 black king, b7 black bishop, f7 black pawn, g7 black pawn, a6 black pawn, b6 black queen, d6 black pawn, h6 black pawn, b5 white pawn, d5 white pawn, e5 black knight, b4 black knight, c4 white knight, d4 white knight, e4 white pawn, a3 white rook, h3 white pawn, b2 white pawn, f2 white pawn, g2 white pawn, b1 white bishop, c1 white bishop, d1 white queen, e1 white rook, g1 white king

Position after 22. Nxc4

As a participant of the 1988–89 World Cup series, he competed at Brussels, Belfort, Reykjavík and Rotterdam, finishing an overall 11th from a field of 25 and winning a combined prize fund of $36,584. In the following game, played during the Brussels leg in 1989, Sokolov sacrifices a piece and then the exchange in order to create a powerful double threat of two passed pawns on one wing and a kingside attack on the other.

Sokolov vs. Lajos Portisch
1.e4 e5 2.Nf3 Nc6 3.Bb5 a6 4.Ba4 Nf6 5.0-0 Be7 6.Re1 b5 7.Bb3 d6 8.c3 0-0 9.h3 Bb7 10.d4 Re8 11.Ng5 Rf8 12.Nf3 Re8 13.Nbd2 Bf8 14.a4 h6 15.Bc2 exd4 16.cxd4 Nb4 17.Bb1 c5 18.d5 Nd7 19.Ra3 c4 20.Nd4 Ne5 21.axb5 Qb6 22.Nxc4 Nxc4 23.Rg3 Bc8 24.b3 Ne5 25.Be3 Ng6 26.f4 Qd8 27.f5 Ne5 28.Qd2 a5 29.Bxh6 Qh4 30.Kh2 Bd7 31.Bg5 Qh5 32.Rf1 g6 33.Nc6 Bxc6 34.dxc6 Rab8 35.fxg6 fxg6 36.c7 Rbc8 37.b6 Qh7 38.Rxf8+ Rxf8 39.Qxd6 Nbc6 40.Bf6 Rxf6 41.Qxf6 Qd7 42.b7 1–0
