= World Chess Championship 1990 =

Chess match between Garry Kasparov and Anatoly Karpov

	Defending champion	Challenger
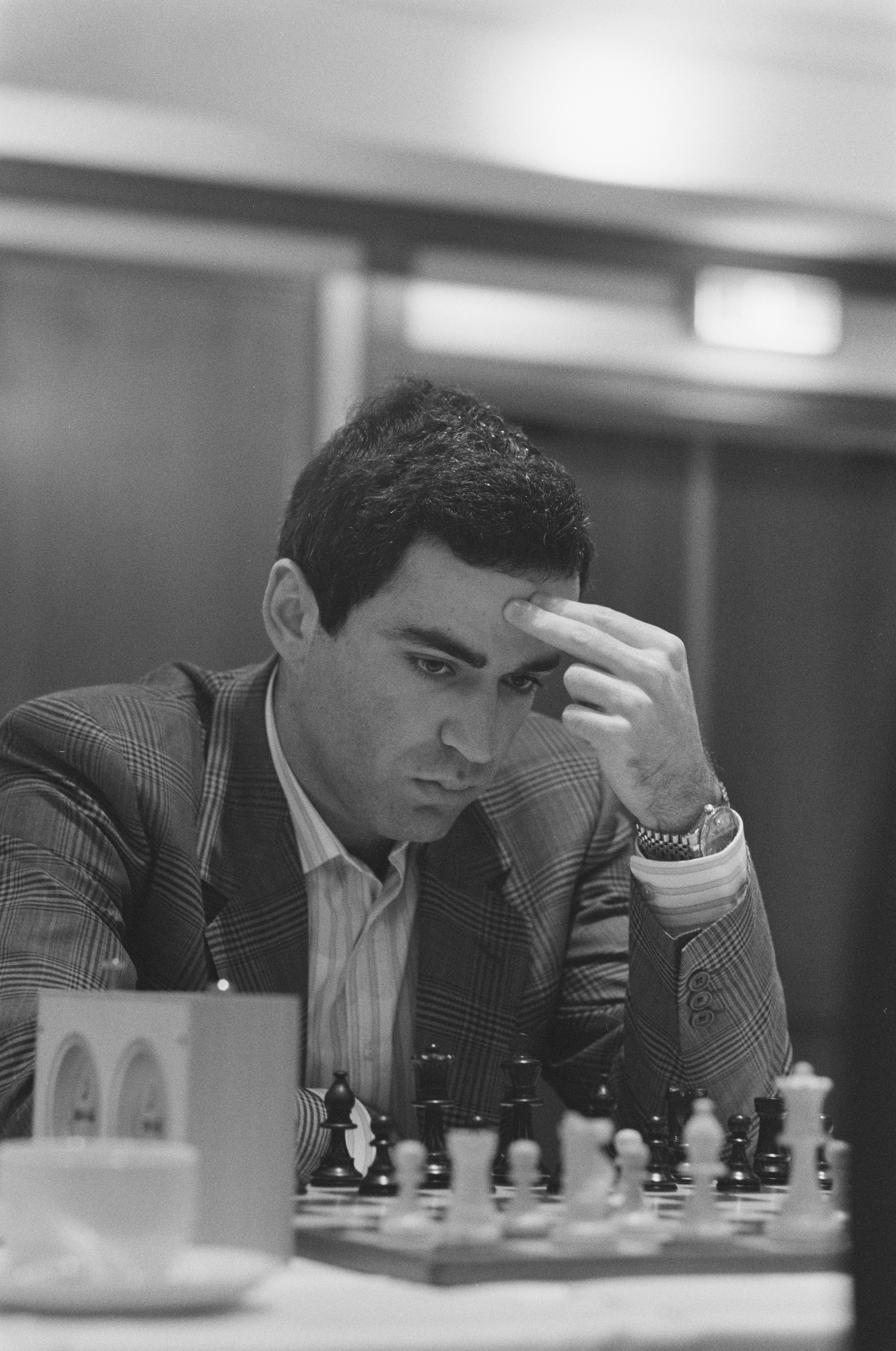
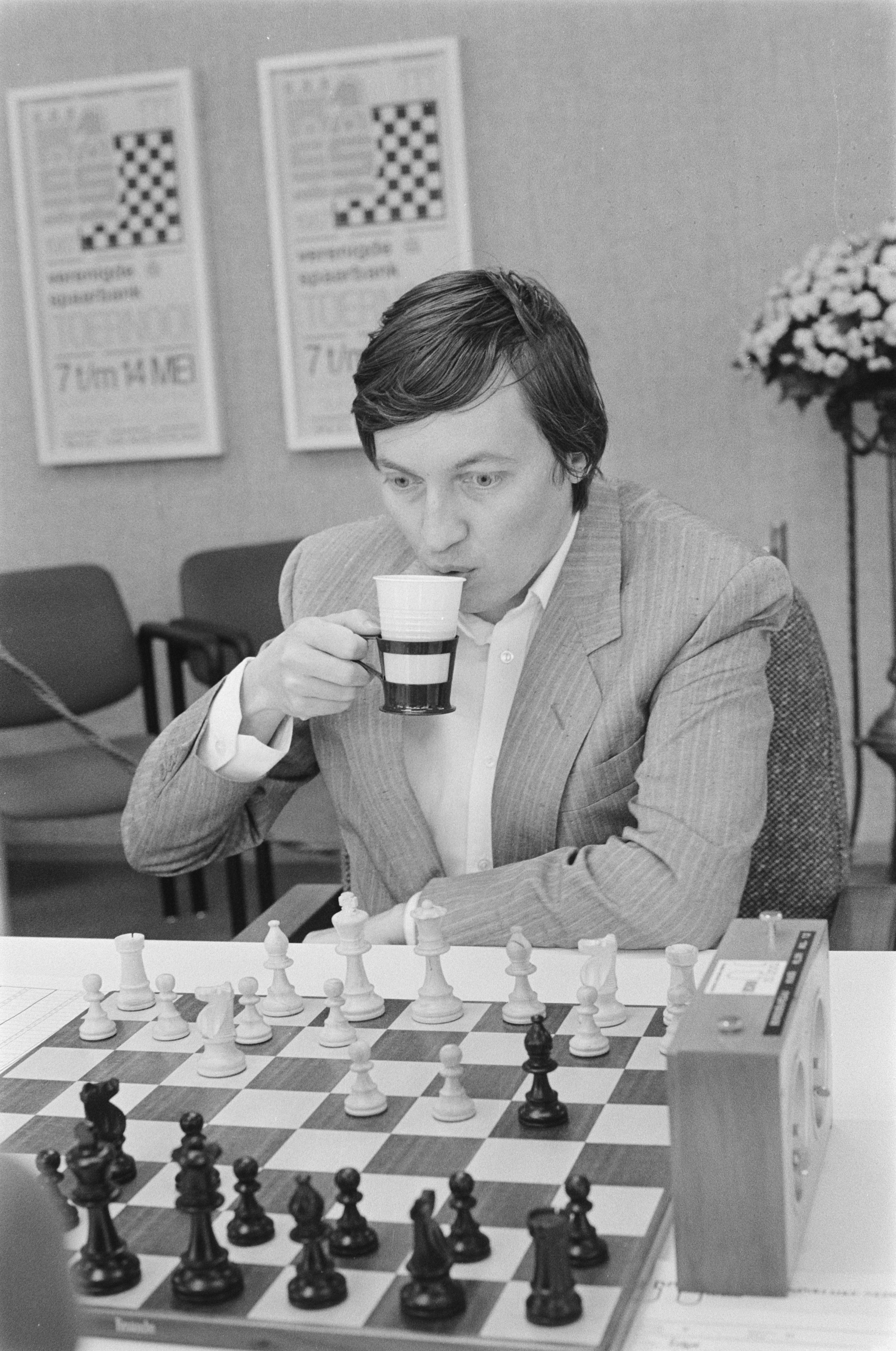
	Garry Kasparov	Anatoly Karpov
	(Russia) (Note: Although formally representing the Soviet Union, Kasparov used the Russian historical tricolour flag, used by the anti-Soviet opposition at the time of the USSR's collapse.) Garry Kasparov	(Soviet Union) Anatoly Karpov
12½	Scores	11½
	Born 13 April 1963; 27 years old	Born 23 May 1951; 39 years old
	Winner of the 1987 World Chess Championship	Winner of the Candidates Tournament
	Rating: 2800 (World No. 1)	Rating: 2730 (World No. 2)

The World Chess Championship 1990 was played between Garry Kasparov and Anatoly Karpov. It was the fifth and final Kasparov–Karpov championship match, and saw Kasparov win by a single point. The first twelve games were played in New York City from 8 October to 7 November and the other half was played in Lyon from 26 November to 30 December.

The players for the candidates tournament (the tournament to decide who will challenge the world championship) were selected as the top three winners of three interzonals, which were held in Subotica, Yugoslavia, Szirák, Hungary and Zagreb, Yugoslavia, respectively. The remaining players were the four runners up to the previous candidates tournament, a wild card (Kevin Spraggett), and Karpov, who qualified automatically by dint of having been the challenger for the previous world championship.

== Background ==
=== 1987 Interzonal tournaments ===
Three Interzonals were held in the summer of 1987, with 16 to 18 players playing in each and the top three scorers from each qualifying for the candidates tournament, in turn the winner of which would challenge the world championship.

June–July 1987 Interzonal, Subotica
		Rating	1	2	3	4	5	6	7	8	9	10	11	12	13	14	15	16	Total	Tie break
1	Gyula Sax (Hungary)	2570	-	1	½	½	½	1	1	½	½	0	1	½	1	½	1	1	10½	74.25
2	Nigel Short (England)	2615	0	-	½	½	1	1	½	1	½	1	½	1	½	1	½	1	10½	73.00
3	Jon Speelman (England)	2550	½	½	-	0	1	½	½	½	1	½	1	1	½	1	1	1	10½	70.75
4	Mikhail Tal (Soviet Union)	2605	½	½	1	-	½	½	1	½	½	½	1	1	½	1	0	1	10	72.50
5	Zoltán Ribli (Hungary)	2580	½	0	0	½	-	½	½	½	1	½	1	1	1	1	1	1	10	63.25
6	Amador Rodríguez Céspedes (Cuba)	2495	0	0	½	½	½	-	½	½	½	1	0	1	½	1	1	1	8½	
7	Slavoljub Marjanović (Yugoslavia)	2505	0	½	½	0	½	½	-	½	0	½	1	1	½	½	1	1	8	
8	Vasily Smyslov (Soviet Union)	2550	½	0	½	½	½	½	½	-	½	0	0	1	1	½	1	½	7½	52.00
9	Alexander Chernin (Soviet Union)	2570	½	½	0	½	0	½	1	½	-	1	0	0	1	0	1	1	7½	51.00
10	Petar Popović (Yugoslavia)	2540	1	0	½	½	½	0	½	1	0	-	1	0	0	½	½	1	7	
11	Alonso Zapata (Colombia)	2505	0	½	0	0	0	1	0	1	1	0	-	½	0	1	½	1	6½	
12	Thomas Ernst (Sweden)	2465	½	0	0	0	0	0	0	0	1	1	½	-	1	1	1	0	6	
13	Lev Alburt (United States)	2575	0	½	½	½	0	½	½	0	0	1	1	0	-	½	0	½	5½	
14	Xu Jun (China)	2495	½	0	0	0	0	0	½	½	1	½	0	0	½	-	1	½	5	
15	Devaki Prasad (India)	2425	0	½	0	1	0	0	0	0	0	½	½	0	1	0	-	½	4	
16	Ahmed Ibrahim Hamed (Egypt)	2310	0	0	0	0	0	0	0	½	0	0	0	1	½	½	½	-	3	

In the first tournament in Subotica, Sax, Short, and Speelman qualified. Lubomir Kavalek withdrew after six rounds; his results are not included in the totals for the other players. Robert Hübner was invited, but declined to participate. As a result, Ribli had a free day during the last round. To show his displeasure, he refused to take part in a playoff against Tal, which could have been important, if a reserve spot had opened up in the Candidates Tournament.

July–August 1987 Interzonal, Szirak
		Rating	1	2	3	4	5	6	7	8	9	10	11	12	13	14	15	16	17	18	Total	Tie break
1	Valery Salov (Soviet Union)	2575	-	½	½	½	1	1	½	1	½	0	½	1	1	½	1	1	1	1	12½	97.25
2	Jóhann Hjartarson (Iceland)	2550	½	-	½	½	½	½	1	1	½	1	1	½	0	1	1	1	1	1	12½	96.50
3	Lajos Portisch (Hungary)	2615	½	½	-	½	1	½	0	1	1	1	1	1	1	1	½	½	½	½	12	98.50
4	John Nunn (England)	2585	½	½	½	-	½	0	1	½	1	1	1	1	½	1	0	1	1	1	12	92.50
5	Alexander Beliavsky (Soviet Union)	2630	0	½	0	½	-	½	½	½	½	1	½	1	½	1	1	1	1	1	11	
6	Ulf Andersson (Sweden)	2600	0	½	½	1	½	-	½	1	½	½	½	½	1	1	½	½	½	1	10½	
7	Ljubomir Ljubojević (Yugoslavia)	2625	½	0	1	0	½	½	-	½	½	½	1	½	½	1	1	½	½	1	10	
8	Larry Christiansen (United States)	2575	0	0	0	½	½	0	½	-	½	1	½	1	1	0	1	½	1	1	9	
9	Joel Benjamin (United States)	2575	½	½	0	0	½	½	½	½	-	0	½	½	1	0	½	1	1	1	8½	61.75
10	Miodrag Todorcevic (Yugoslavia)	2475	1	0	0	0	0	½	½	0	1	-	1	0	½	0	1	1	1	1	8½	59.75
11	Mihail Marin (Romania)	2475	½	0	0	0	½	½	0	½	½	0	-	1	½	½	1	½	½	1	7½	52.75
12	Dragoljub Velimirović (Yugoslavia)	2520	0	½	0	0	0	½	½	0	½	1	0	-	1	½	1	0	1	1	7½	51.75
13	András Adorján (Hungary)	2540	0	1	0	½	½	0	½	0	0	½	½	0	-	1	½	½	1	½	7	55.00
14	Gilberto Milos (Brazil)	2495	½	0	0	0	0	0	0	1	1	1	½	½	0	-	½	1	0	1	7	49.75
15	Glenn Flear (England)	2480	0	0	½	1	0	½	0	0	½	0	0	0	½	½	-	½	1	1	6	
16	Jesús de la Villa (Spain)	2485	0	0	½	0	0	½	½	½	0	0	½	1	½	0	½	-	0	1	5½	
17	Slim Bouaziz (Tunisia)	2370	0	0	½	0	0	½	½	0	0	0	½	0	0	1	0	1	-	½	4½	
18	Denis Allan (Canada)	2310	0	0	½	0	0	0	0	0	0	0	0	0	½	0	0	0	½	-	1½	

In the Szirák tournament, Valery Salov and Jóhann Hjartarson finished at the top of the table, while Lajos Portisch and John Nunn tied for third. The last place in the Candidates Tournament was decided in a separate playoff in Budapest, with Portisch defeating Nunn 4–2.

August 1987 Interzonal, Zagreb
		Rating	1	2	3	4	5	6	7	8	9	10	11	12	13	14	15	16	17	Total	Tie break
1	Viktor Korchnoi (Switzerland)	2630	-	½	1	0	½	½	0	1	1	1	1	1	½	½	1	½	1	11	
2	Jaan Ehlvest (Soviet Union)	2540	½	-	½	½	1	1	0	½	1	0	½	1	1	1	1	½	0	10	80.75
3	Yasser Seirawan (United States)	2600	0	½	-	1	½	½	1	0	0	1	1	1	½	0	1	1	1	10	73.50
4	Jesús Nogueiras (Cuba)	2555	1	½	0	-	1	½	½	½	½	½	½	0	½	½	1	1	1	9½	71.00
5	Predrag Nikolić (Yugoslavia)	2620	½	0	½	0	-	½	0	½	1	½	1	½	1	1	½	1	1	9½	67.50
6	Julio Granda (Peru)	2525	½	0	½	½	½	-	½	½	½	½	½	0	1	1	1	1	1	9½	67.50
7	Eugenio Torre (Philippines)	2540	1	1	0	½	1	½	-	½	0	1	½	½	0	0	1	½	1	9	
8	Lev Polugaevsky (Soviet Union)	2595	0	½	1	½	½	½	½	-	½	½	1	½	½	½	0	½	1	8½	65.25
9	Vereslav Eingorn (Soviet Union)	2575	0	0	1	½	0	½	1	½	-	½	0	1	1	½	0	1	1	8½	61.25
10	Yehuda Gruenfeld (Israel)	2545	0	1	0	½	½	½	0	½	½	-	0	1	½	½	1	1	1	8½	59.50
11	József Pintér (Hungary)	2575	0	½	0	½	0	½	½	0	1	1	-	1	0	½	1	1	1	8½	59.25
12	Krunoslav Hulak (Yugoslavia)	2495	0	0	0	1	½	1	½	½	0	0	0	-	½	1	½	1	1	7½	
13	Ventzislav Inkiov (Bulgaria)	2485	½	0	½	½	0	0	1	½	0	½	1	½	-	½	½	½	½	7	
14	Tony Miles (England)	2585	½	0	1	½	0	0	1	½	½	½	½	0	½	-	0	0	1	6½	
15	Dragan Barlov (Yugoslavia)	2555	0	0	0	0	½	0	0	1	1	0	0	½	½	1	-	½	1	6	
16	Jörg Hickl (West Germany)	2455	½	½	0	0	0	0	½	½	0	0	0	0	½	1	½	-	1	5	
17	Fletcher Baragar (Canada)	2320	0	1	0	0	0	0	0	0	0	0	0	0	½	0	0	0	-	1½	

Viktor Korchnoi emerged as winner of the last tournament in Zagreb, ahead of Jaan Ehlvest and Yasser Seirawan. In an extra playoff in Havana in November, Nikolić took the place as reserve for the Candidates Tournament with 6 points, ahead of Granda (4) and Nogueiras (2). No reserve was needed, however.

=== 1988–90 Candidates Tournament ===
In addition to nine players from the Interzonals, the top four of the previous Candidates Tournament (Sokolov, Timman, Vaganian, and Yusupov) qualified directly for this tournament. The Canadian organizers of the preliminary matches (which were held in Saint John, New Brunswick) nominated one player, (Spraggett). Finally, Karpov, the challenger in the previous cycle, was seeded into the quarterfinals.

Preliminary matches Saint John, Jan–Feb 1988
(Hungary)	Lajos Portisch	3½
(Soviet Union)	Rafael Vaganian	2½
(Soviet Union)	Valery Salov	2½
(Netherlands)	Jan Timman	3½
(England)	Jon Speelman	4
(United States)	Yasser Seirawan	1
(England)	Nigel Short	3½
(Hungary)	Gyula Sax	1½
(Soviet Union)	Artur Yusupov	3½
(Soviet Union)	Jaan Ehlvest	1½
(Canada)	Kevin Spraggett	6½
(Soviet Union)	Andrei Sokolov	5½
(Iceland)	Jóhann Hjartarson	4½
(Switzerland)	Viktor Korchnoi	3½

Quarterfinals; Antwerp, London, Quebec, and Seattle, Aug 1988 – Feb 1989
(Hungary) Lajos Portisch	2½
(Netherlands) Jan Timman	3½
(England) Jon Speelman	3½
(England) Nigel Short	1½
(Soviet Union) Artur Yusupov	5
(Canada) Kevin Spraggett	4
(Iceland) Jóhann Hjartarson	1½
(Soviet Union) Anatoly Karpov	3½

Semifinals; London, Oct 1989
(Netherlands) Jan Timman	4½
(England) Jon Speelman	3½
(Soviet Union) Artur Yusupov	3½
(Soviet Union) Anatoly Karpov	4½

Final; Kuala Lumpur, Mar 1990
(Netherlands) Jan Timman	2½
(Soviet Union) Anatoly Karpov	6½

Karpov won, once again facing Kasparov for the fifth and final time in seven years. Karpov later alleged that a Dutch sponsor had offered to pay him to lose the match against Timman.

== 1990 Championship match ==
The first twelve games were played in New York City (8 October – 7 November), the other twelve taking place in Lyon, France (26 November – 30 December). Kasparov was considered the favourite to win the match, having defeated Karpov in the previous three world championships, and had reached a record rating of 2800.

As in previous matches, the champion had "draw odds" - if the match was tied 12-12, the champion (Kasparov) would retain the title. Pointing to the closeness of their previous matches, Karpov proposed that instead, they play on if there was a tie, with the winner being the first to win another game. Kasparov declined this alteration.

World Chess Championship Match 1990
	Rating	1	2	3	4	5	6	7	8	9	10	11	12	13	14	15	16	17	18	19	20	21	22	23	24	Total
Anatoly Karpov (Soviet Union)	2730	½	0	½	½	½	½	1	½	½	½	½	½	½	½	½	0	1	0	½	0	½	½	1	½	11½
Garry Kasparov (Russia)	2800	½	1	½	½	½	½	0	½	½	½	½	½	½	½	½	1	0	1	½	1	½	½	0	½	12½

Kasparov clinched the title after Game 22, when he led 12-10. The two final games were played, and Kasparov won the match 12½-11½.

Although still a Soviet citizen, Kasparov refused to play the Championship match under the flag of the USSR. Instead, he wanted to use the Russian flag (not the flag of the RSFSR, but the old tri-color) which, incidentally, would be re-adopted after the collapse of the Soviet Union a year later. Kasparov was indeed allowed to play with a small Russian tri-color at the table.

This would be Kasparov and Karpov's last world championship match against each other. Kasparov said of the match:

"Before the match I was planning a blitzkrieg and I predicted that Karpov would be crushed, but our fifth battle for the crown, as usual, turned into a hard fight and lasted the full 24 games. I would explain this by inadequacy of my preparation, including the phsical aspect. I simply lacked the nervous energy for carrying out of a blitzkrieg. […] Indeed, my play way too uneven, ubnalanced, and at times obviously poor. In a good half dozen games I missed a certain win, suddenly losing energy at decisive moments, and all three of my defeats were the result of blunders and inexplicable mental black-outs. […] Today, nearly twenty years later, after soberly assesing the unprecedented complexity and drama of the situation prior to the match, I wonder by what miracle my team nevertheless managed to cope with the challenges of those turbulent times. Despite all the difficulties and extreme fatigue, I was sustained by confidence in my playing superiority over the opponent (as in the 1986 match, not once was he able to take the lead). The fifth match was destined to become the last one in my lengthy battle with Karpov for the chess crown, although at the start of 1991, this was far from obvious.”

== Games ==
=== Game 1: Karpov-Kasparov, 1/2-1/2 ===
Karpov-Kasparov, game 1

Position: a8 black rook, e8 black rook, g8 black king, b7 black bishop, f7 black pawn, h7 black pawn, g6 black pawn, h6 black bishop, b5 black pawn, d5 black queen, c4 black knight, d4 white knight, f3 white pawn, b2 white pawn, f2 white bishop, g2 white pawn, h2 white pawn, a1 white rook, d1 white queen, e1 white rook, f1 white bishop, g1 white king

Position after 21.. axb5. Here the critical idea for Karpov was 22. b3!, which forces the knight to retreat to d6, but he instead played Rxa8.

The players played a highly theoretical opening, with 6. Be3 c6, known as the Byrne variation. Neither player was able to seize a convincing advantage. Several contemporary analysts, including chess computer Deep Thought, believed Karpov could've played for a small advantage with 22. b3, though he broke the tension instead by playing 22. Rxa6. After 30.. Ba2, Kasparov offered a draw, which Karpov accepted. They each had ten more moves to make before the time increase; Karpov had 7 minutes left and Kasparov had 15.

King's Indian Defence, Sämisch Variation (ECO E81)
1.d4 Nf6 2.c4 g6 3.Nc3 Bg7 4.e4 d6 5.f3 O-O 6.Be3 c6 7.Bd3 a6 8.Nge2 b5 9.O-O Nbd7 10.Rc1 e5 11.a3 exd4 12.Nxd4 Bb7 13.cxb5 cxb5 14.Re1 Ne5 15.Bf1 Re8 16.Bf2 d5 17.exd5 Nxd5 18.Nxd5 Qxd5 19.a4 Bh6 20.Ra1 Nc4 21.axb5 axb5 22.Rxa8 Rxa8 23.Qb3 Bc6 24.Bd3 Nd6 25.Qxd5 Bxd5 26.Nxb5 Nxb5 27.Bxb5 Bg7 28.b4 Bc3 29.Rd1 Bb3 30.Rb1 Ba2 1/2-1/2

=== Game 2: Kasparov-Karpov, 1-0 ===
Kasparov-Karpov, game 2

Position: c8 black bishop, e8 black rook, f8 black bishop, g8 black knight, f7 black pawn, h7 black king, a6 black rook, c6 black pawn, d6 black pawn, g6 black pawn, h6 black pawn, a5 black pawn, b5 black queen, b4 black knight, c4 white knight, d4 white pawn, e4 white pawn, g4 white knight, c3 white rook, e3 white bishop, f3 white pawn, h3 white pawn, b2 white pawn, g2 white pawn, b1 white bishop, c1 white queen, e1 white rook, g1 white king

Position after 24.. Ng8. This led to 25. Bxh6 Bxh6 26. Nxh6 Nxh6 27. Nxd6, forking the queen and rook. 25. Bxh6 Be7 would have still left Kasparov with an advantage, as he has a strong attack on the weakened black king.

Karpov played 9.. Bb7 in this game, which he had used to defeat Timman in the candidates final. However, he made an inaccuracy with 24.. Ng8. This allowed for an exchange on the h6 square, leading to the diversion of the bishop from the protection of d6, and Kasparov was able to fork the queen and rook. 22.. Kh7 surprised contemporary commentators, a move which Karpov spent 10 minutes thinking of. Many expected a queen retreat.

Ruy Lopez, Closed (ECO C92)
1.e4 e5 2.Nf3 Nc6 3.Bb5 a6 4.Ba4 Nf6 5.O-O Be7 6.Re1 b5 7.Bb3 d6 8.c3 O-O 9.h3 Bb7 10.d4 Re8 11.Nbd2 Bf8 12.a4 h6 13.Bc2 exd4 14.cxd4 Nb4 15.Bb1 bxa4 16.Rxa4 a5 17.Ra3 Ra6 18.Nh2 g6 19.f3 Qd7 20.Nc4 Qb5 21.Rc3 Bc8 22.Be3 Kh7 23.Qc1 c6 24.Ng4 Ng8 25.Bxh6 Bxh6 26.Nxh6 Nxh6 27.Nxd6 Qb6 28.Nxe8 Qxd4+ 29.Kh1 Qd8 30.Rd1 Qxe8 31.Qg5 Ra7 32.Rd8 Qe6 33.f4 Ba6 34.f5 Qe7 35.Qd2 Qe5 36.Qf2 Qe7 37.Qd4 Ng8 38.e5 Nd5 39.fxg6 fxg6 40.Rxc6 Qxd8 41.Qxa7+ Nde7 42.Rxa6 Qd1+ 43.Qg1 Qd2 44.Qf1 1-0

=== Game 3: Karpov-Kasparov, 1/2-1/2 ===
Instead of 15. O-O, Karpov could've been more active, with b4 or Ng5.

King's Indian (ECO E92)
1.d4 Nf6 2.c4 g6 3.Nc3 Bg7 4.e4 d6 5.Nf3 O-O 6.Be2 e5 7.Be3 Qe7 8.dxe5 dxe5 9.Nd5 Qd8 10.Bc5 Nxe4 11.Be7 Qd7 12.Bxf8 Kxf8 13.Qc2 Nc5 14.Rd1 Nc6 15.O-O Ne6 16.Nb6 axb6 17.Rxd7 Bxd7 18.Qd2 Be8 19.b3 e4 20.Ne1 f5 21.Bd1 Ne5 22.Nc2 Rxa2 23.Qd5 Ke7 24.Nb4 c6 25.Qxe6+ Kxe6 26.Nxa2 Nf7 27.Be2 Nd6 28.Nb4 Bc3 29.Nc2 f4 30.Rd1 h5 31.f3 e3 32.g3 g5 33.Bd3 h4 34.Kf1 c5 35.Ke2 b5 36.cxb5 Nxb5 37.Bc4+ Ke7 38.Rd5 Bf6 39.Rxc5 Nc3+ 40.Kf1 Bg6 41.Ne1 Kd6 42.Ra5 fxg3 43.hxg3 hxg3 44.Ng2 b5 45.Ra6+ Ke7 46.Ra7+ Ke8 47.Ra8+ Bd8 48.Nxe3 bxc4 49.Nxc4 g4 50.Kg2 Ne2 51.Ne5 gxf3 52.Kxf3 g2 53.Rxd8+ 1/2-1/2

=== Game 4: Kasparov-Karpov, 1/2-1/2 ===
Ruy Lopez, Closed (ECO C92)
1.e4 e5 2.Nf3 Nc6 3.Bb5 a6 4.Ba4 Nf6 5.O-O Be7 6.Re1 b5 7.Bb3 d6 8.c3 O-O 9.h3 Bb7 10.d4 Re8 11.Nbd2 Bf8 12.a4 h6 13.Bc2 exd4 14.cxd4 Nb4 15.Bb1 c5 16.d5 Nd7 17.Ra3 f5 18.exf5 Nf6 19.Ne4 Bxd5 20.Nxf6+ Qxf6 21.Bd2 Qxb2 22.Bxb4 Bf7 23.Re6 Qxb4 24.Rb3 Qxa4 25.Bc2 Rad8 26.Rbe3 Qb4 27.g3 a5 28.Nh4 d5 29.Qe2 Qc4 30.Bd3 Qc1+ 31.Kg2 c4 32.Bc2 Bxe6 33.Rxe6 Rxe6 34.Qxe6+ Kh8 35.Ng6+ Kh7 36.Qe2 Qg5 37.f6 Qxf6 38.Nxf8+ Kg8 39.Ng6 Qf7 40.Ne7+ Kf8 41.Ng6+ 1/2-1/2

=== Game 5: Karpov-Kasparov, 1/2-1/2 ===
King's Indian (ECO E92)
1.d4 Nf6 2.c4 g6 3.Nc3 Bg7 4.e4 d6 5.Nf3 O-O 6.Be2 e5 7.Be3 Na6 8.O-O c6 9.dxe5 dxe5 10.Qxd8 Rxd8 11.Rfd1 Re8 12.h3 Bf8 13.Nd2 b6 14.a3 Nc5 15.b4 Ne6 16.Nb3 Ba6 17.f3 Nh5 18.Bf2 Red8 19.Bf1 Nhf4 20.g3 Nh5 21.Kg2 f5 22.Rab1 Rac8 23.Rxd8 Rxd8 24.Rd1 Rxd1 25.Nxd1 fxe4 26.fxe4 c5 27.bxc5 Nxc5 28.Nxc5 Bxc5 29.Bxc5 bxc5 30.Nc3 Nf6 31.Kf3 Bb7 32.Bd3 Kf8 33.h4 h6 34.Bc2 Ke7 35.Ba4 a6 36.Ke3 1/2-1/2

=== Game 6: Kasparov-Karpov, 1/2-1/2 ===
Ruy Lopez, Closed (ECO C92)
1.e4 e5 2.Nf3 Nc6 3.Bb5 a6 4.Ba4 Nf6 5.O-O Be7 6.Re1 b5 7.Bb3 d6 8.c3 O-O 9.h3 Nd7 10.d4 Bf6 11.a4 Bb7 12.axb5 axb5 13.Rxa8 Qxa8 14.d5 Na5 15.Bc2 Nc4 16.b3 Ncb6 17.Na3 Ba6 18.Nh2 c6 19.dxc6 Qxc6 20.Bd2 Be7 21.Ng4 Ra8 22.Ne3 Nf6 23.Nf5 Bf8 24.Bg5 Nbd7 25.c4 bxc4 26.bxc4 Bxc4 27.Nxc4 Qxc4 28.Bb3 Qc3 29.Kh2 h6 30.Bxf6 Nxf6 31.Re3 Qc7 32.Rf3 Kh7 33.Ne3 Qe7 34.Nd5 Nxd5 35.Bxd5 Ra7 36.Qb3 f6 37.Qb8 g6 38.Rc3 h5 39.g4 Kh6 40.gxh5 Kxh5 41.Rc8 Bg7 42.Re8 1/2-1/2

=== Game 7: Karpov-Kasparov, 1-0 ===
King's Indian (ECO E92)
1.d4 Nf6 2.c4 g6 3.Nc3 Bg7 4.e4 d6 5.Nf3 O-O 6.Be2 e5 7.Be3 Na6 8.O-O Ng4 9.Bg5 f6 10.Bc1 Kh8 11.h3 Nh6 12.dxe5 fxe5 13.Be3 Nf7 14.Qd2 Nc5 15.Ng5 Nxg5 16.Bxg5 Bf6 17.Be3 Ne6 18.Bg4 h5 19.Bxe6 Bxe6 20.Nd5 Bh4 21.Rac1 Kh7 22.Rc3 Rf7 23.b3 c6 24.Nb4 Rd7 25.Rcc1 Bf6 26.f4 exf4 27.Bxf4 Qa5 28.Nd5 Qc5+ 29.Kh1 Bxd5 30.cxd5 Qd4 31.dxc6 bxc6 32.Rxc6 Re8 33.Rc4 Qxd2 34.Bxd2 Be5 35.Be3 Bg3 36.Rf3 h4 37.Bf2 Bxf2 38.Rxf2 Rde7 39.Rf4 g5 40.Rf6 Rxe4 41.Rxe4 Rxe4 42.Rxd6 Re7 43.Ra6 Kg7 44.Kg1 1-0

=== Game 8: Kasparov-Karpov, 1/2-1/2 ===
Ruy Lopez, Closed (ECO C92)
1.e4 e5 2.Nf3 Nc6 3.Bb5 a6 4.Ba4 Nf6 5.O-O Be7 6.Re1 b5 7.Bb3 d6 8.c3 O-O 9.h3 Nd7 10.d4 Bf6 11.a4 Bb7 12.Be3 Na5 13.Bc2 Nc4 14.Bc1 d5 15.dxe5 Ncxe5 16.Nxe5 Nxe5 17.axb5 axb5 18.Rxa8 Qxa8 19.f4 Ng6 20.e5 Bh4 21.Rf1 Be7 22.Nd2 Bc5+ 23.Kh2 d4 24.Qe2 dxc3 25.bxc3 Rd8 26.Ne4 Ba3 27.Bxa3 Bxe4 28.Qxe4 Qxa3 29.f5 Ne7 30.Qh4 f6 31.Qg3 Kf8 32.Kh1 Qc5 33.exf6 gxf6 34.Bb3 Nd5 35.Qh4 Kg7 36.Rd1 c6 37.Rd4 Qxc3 38.Rg4+ Kh8 39.Bxd5 Qa1+ 40.Kh2 Qe5+ 41.Rg3 cxd5 42.Qg4 Qc7 43.Qd4 Qd6 44.Kh1 Re8 45.Qg4 Qd7 46.Rd3 Re1+ 47.Kh2 Re4 48.Qg3 Re5 49.Ra3 Re8 50.Qf4 Qb7 51.Kh1 Qb8 52.Qh4 Qb6 53.Qb4 d4 54.Rg3 Qc7 55.Rd3 Qc1+ 56.Kh2 Qf4+ 57.Kg1 Qc1+ 58.Kh2 Qf4+ 59.Kg1 Rc8 60.Rd1 Rd8 61.Qxb5 Qe3+ 62.Kh1 d3 63.Qa5 Qd4 64.Qa1 Qb6 65.Qa2 Kg7 66.Qd2 Qc5 67.Rf1 Rd4 68.Rf3 Qd6 69.Re3 Ra4 70.Re1 h5 71.Rb1 Qd7 72.Qd1 Kh6 73.Qd2+ Kg7 74.Qe3 h4 75.Qf3 Kh6 76.Qe3+ Kg7 77.Qf3 d2 78.Qh5 Qf7 79.Qxf7+ Kxf7 80.Rd1 Rd4 81.Kg1 Rd5 82.Kf2 Rxf5+ 83.Ke2 Rg5 84.Kf2 1/2-1/2

=== Game 9: Karpov-Kasparov, 1/2-1/2 ===
Grunfeld (ECO D85)
1.d4 Nf6 2.c4 g6 3.Nc3 d5 4.cxd5 Nxd5 5.e4 Nxc3 6.bxc3 Bg7 7.Be3 c5 8.Qd2 cxd4 9.cxd4 Nc6 10.Rd1 Qa5 11.Qxa5 Nxa5 12.Nf3 O-O 13.Be2 Bd7 14.Bd2 b6 15.O-O Rfd8 16.Rc1 Bg4 17.d5 Nb7 18.h3 Bxf3 19.Bxf3 Nc5 20.Be3 Rac8 21.Bg4 Rb8 22.Rc4 h5 23.Bf3 e6 24.Rd1 exd5 25.exd5 Be5 26.g4 hxg4 27.hxg4 Nb7 28.Ra4 Na5 29.g5 Rbc8 30.Be2 Bd6 31.Kg2 Bc5 32.Bd2 Rxd5 33.Bf3 Rdd8 34.Bxa5 1/2-1/2

=== Game 10: Kasparov-Karpov, 1/2-1/2 ===
Petrov, Modern Attack (ECO C43)
1.e4 e5 2.Nf3 Nf6 3.d4 exd4 4.e5 Ne4 5.Qxd4 d5 6.exd6 Nxd6 7.Nc3 Nc6 8.Qf4 Nf5 9.Bb5 Bd6 10.Qe4+ Qe7 11.Bg5 f6 12.Bd2 Bd7 13.O-O-O Qxe4 14.Nxe4 Be7 15.g4 a6 16.Bc4 Nd6 17.Nxd6+ Bxd6 18.Rde1+ 1/2-1/2

=== Game 11: Karpov-Kasparov, 1/2-1/2 ===
King's Indian (ECO E92)
1.d4 Nf6 2.c4 g6 3.Nc3 Bg7 4.e4 d6 5.Nf3 O-O 6.Be2 e5 7.Be3 exd4 8.Nxd4 Re8 9.f3 c6 10.Qd2 d5 11.exd5 cxd5 12.O-O Nc6 13.c5 Rxe3 14.Qxe3 Qf8 15.Nxc6 bxc6 16.Kh1 Rb8 17.Na4 Rb4 18.b3 Be6 19.Nb2 Nh5 20.Nd3 Rh4 21.Qf2 Qe7 22.g4 Bd4 23.Qxd4 Rxh2+ 24.Kxh2 Qh4+ 1/2-1/2

=== Game 12: Kasparov-Karpov, 1/2-1/2 ===
Ruy Lopez, Closed (ECO C92)
1.e4 e5 2.Nf3 Nc6 3.Bb5 a6 4.Ba4 Nf6 5.O-O Be7 6.Re1 b5 7.Bb3 d6 8.c3 O-O 9.h3 Nd7 10.d4 Bf6 11.a4 Bb7 12.Na3 exd4 13.cxd4 Na5 14.Ba2 b4 15.Nc4 Nxc4 16.Bxc4 Re8 17.Qb3 Rxe4 18.Bxf7+ Kh8 19.Be3 Re7 20.Bd5 c6 21.Be6 Nf8 22.Bg4 a5 23.Rac1 Ng6 24.Bh5 Rc8 25.Bg4 Rb8 26.Qc2 Rc7 27.Qf5 Ne7 28.Qd3 Nd5 29.Bd2 c5 30.Be6 Nb6 31.dxc5 dxc5 32.Qxd8+ Rxd8 33.Bf4 Re7 34.Ng5 Bd5 35.Bxd5 Rxd5 36.Rxe7 Bxe7 37.Re1 1/2-1/2

=== Game 13: Karpov-Kasparov, 1/2-1/2 ===
Grunfeld (ECO D85)
1.d4 Nf6 2.c4 g6 3.Nc3 d5 4.cxd5 Nxd5 5.e4 Nxc3 6.bxc3 Bg7 7.Be3 c5 8.Qd2 O-O 9.Rc1 Qa5 10.Nf3 e6 11.d5 exd5 12.exd5 Re8 13.Be2 Bf5 14.O-O Nd7 15.h3 Nb6 16.g4 Bd7 17.c4 Qxd2 18.Nxd2 Na4 19.Bf3 Nc3 20.Rxc3 Bxc3 21.Ne4 Rxe4 22.Bxe4 Re8 23.Bd3 b6 24.Kg2 f5 25.gxf5 Bxf5 26.Bxf5 gxf5 27.Rd1 Kf7 28.Rd3 Bf6 29.Ra3 a5 30.Rb3 Bd8 31.Rc3 Bc7 32.a4 Kf6 33.Kf1 f4 34.Bc1 Kf5 35.Rc2 Rg8 36.Re2 Be5 37.Bb2 Bd4 38.Bxd4 cxd4 39.Re7 d3 40.Ke1 Rc8 41.Kd2 Rxc4 42.Kxd3 1/2-1/2

=== Game 14: Kasparov-Karpov, 1/2-1/2 ===
Kasparov played the Scotch Game, which was a major surprise.

Scotch Game (ECO C45)
1.e4 e5 2.Nf3 Nc6 3.d4 exd4 4.Nxd4 Nf6 5.Nxc6 bxc6 6.e5 Qe7 7.Qe2 Nd5 8.c4 Ba6 9.b3 O-O-O 10.g3 Re8 11.Bb2 f6 12.Bg2 fxe5 13.O-O h5 14.Qd2 Nf6 15.Qa5 Bb7 16.Ba3 Qe6 17.Bxf8 Rhxf8 18.Qxa7 Qg4 19.Na3 h4 20.Nc2 h3 21.Bh1 Ne4 22.a4 Nc3 23.Rae1 Ne2+ 24.Rxe2 Qxe2 25.Nb4 d5 26.cxd5 cxd5 27.Bxd5 Bxd5 28.Nxd5 Qc2 29.Qa6+ Kd7 30.Ne3 Qe4 31.Rc1 Rb8 32.Qf1 Rxb3 33.Qxh3+ Kd8 34.Qh5 Kc8 35.Qd1 Rxe3 36.fxe3 Qxe3+ 37.Kh1 Qe4+ 38.Kg1 Qe3+ 39.Kh1 Qe4+ 40.Kg1 Rd8 41.Qc2 1/2-1/2

=== Game 15: Karpov-Kasparov, 1/2-1/2 ===
Grunfeld (ECO D85)
1.d4 Nf6 2.c4 g6 3.Nc3 d5 4.cxd5 Nxd5 5.e4 Nxc3 6.bxc3 Bg7 7.Be3 c5 8.Qd2 O-O 9.Nf3 Qa5 10.Rc1 e6 11.Bh6 Nc6 12.h4 cxd4 13.Bxg7 Kxg7 14.cxd4 Qxd2+ 15.Kxd2 Rd8 16.Ke3 Bd7 17.Rb1 Rab8 18.Bd3 Ne7 19.h5 f6 20.hxg6 hxg6 21.Rh2 b6 22.g4 e5 23.dxe5 Bxg4 24.exf6 Kxf6 25.Nd4 Rb7 26.f3 Rbd7 27.Rb4 Be6 28.Rc2 a5 29.Ra4 g5 30.Bb5 Rd6 31.Be2 Bd7 32.Rac4 Re8 33.Rb2 Nd5+ 1/2-1/2

=== Game 16: Kasparov-Karpov, 1-0 ===
Scotch Game (ECO C45)
1.e4 e5 2.Nf3 Nc6 3.d4 exd4 4.Nxd4 Nf6 5.Nxc6 bxc6 6.e5 Qe7 7.Qe2 Nd5 8.c4 Nb6 9.Nd2 Qe6 10.b3 a5 11.Bb2 Bb4 12.a3 Bxd2+ 13.Qxd2 d5 14.cxd5 cxd5 15.Rc1 O-O 16.Rxc7 Qg6 17.f3 Bf5 18.g4 Bb1 19.Bb5 Rac8 20.Rxc8 Rxc8 21.O-O h5 22.h3 hxg4 23.hxg4 Bc2 24.Qd4 Qe6 25.Rf2 Rc7 26.Rh2 Nd7 27.b4 axb4 28.axb4 Nf8 29.Bf1 Bb3 30.Bd3 Bc4 31.Bf5 Qe7 32.Qd2 Rc6 33.Bd4 Ra6 34.Bb1 Ra3 35.Rh3 Rb3 36.Bc2 Qxb4 37.Qf2 Ng6 38.e6 Rb1+ 39.Bxb1 Qxb1+ 40.Kh2 fxe6 41.Qb2 Qxb2+ 42.Bxb2 Nf4 43.Rh4 Nd3 44.Bc3 e5 45.Kg3 d4 46.Bd2 Bd5 47.Rh5 Kf7 48.Ba5 Ke6 49.Rh8 Nb2 50.Re8+ Kd6 51.Bb4+ Kc6 52.Rc8+ Kd7 53.Rc5 Ke6 54.Rc7 g6 55.Re7+ Kf6 56.Rd7 Ba2 57.Ra7 Bc4 58.Ba5 Bd3 59.f4 exf4 60.Kxf4 Bc2 61.Ra6+ Kf7 62.Ke5 Nd3+ 63.Kxd4 Nf2 64.g5 Bf5 65.Bd2 Ke7 66.Kd5 Ne4 67.Ra7+ Ke8 68.Be3 Nc3+ 69.Ke5 Kd8 70.Bb6+ Ke8 71.Rc7 Ne4 72.Be3 Ng3 73.Bf4 Nh5 74.Ra7 Kf8 75.Bh2 Ng7 76.Bg1 Nh5 77.Bc5+ Kg8 78.Kd6 Kf8 79.Bd4 Bg4 80.Be5 Bf5 81.Rh7 Kg8 82.Rc7 Kf8 83.Kc6 Kg8 84.Re7 Kf8 85.Bd6 Kg8 86.Re8+ Kf7 87.Re7+ Kg8 88.Be5 Kf8 89.Ra7 Bg4 90.Kd6 Bh3 91.Ra3 Bg4 92.Re3 Bf5 93.Kc7 Kf7 94.Kd8 Bg4 95.Bb2 Be6 96.Bc3 Bf5 97.Re7+ Kf8 98.Be5 Bd3 99.Ra7 Be4 100.Rc7 Bb1 101.Bd6+ Kg8 102.Ke7 1-0

=== Game 17: Karpov-Kasparov, 1-0 ===
Grunfeld (ECO D85)
1.d4 Nf6 2.c4 g6 3.Nc3 d5 4.cxd5 Nxd5 5.e4 Nxc3 6.bxc3 Bg7 7.Be3 c5 8.Qd2 O-O 9.Nf3 Bg4 10.Ng5 cxd4 11.cxd4 Nc6 12.h3 Bd7 13.Rb1 Rc8 14.Nf3 Na5 15.Bd3 Be6 16.O-O Bc4 17.Rfd1 b5 18.Bg5 a6 19.Rbc1 Bxd3 20.Rxc8 Qxc8 21.Qxd3 Re8 22.Rc1 Qb7 23.d5 Nc4 24.Nd2 Nxd2 25.Bxd2 Rc8 26.Rc6 Be5 27.Bc3 Bb8 28.Qd4 f6 29.Ba5 Bd6 30.Qc3 Re8 31.a3 Kg7 32.g3 Be5 33.Qc5 h5 34.Bc7 Ba1 35.Bf4 Qd7 36.Rc7 Qd8 37.d6 g5 38.d7 Rf8 39.Bd2 Be5 40.Rb7 1-0

=== Game 18: Kasparov-Karpov, 1-0 ===
Ruy Lopez, Closed (ECO C92)
1.e4 e5 2.Nf3 Nc6 3.Bb5 a6 4.Ba4 Nf6 5.O-O Be7 6.Re1 b5 7.Bb3 d6 8.c3 O-O 9.h3 Nd7 10.d4 Bf6 11.a4 Bb7 12.Na3 exd4 13.cxd4 Nb6 14.Bf4 bxa4 15.Bxa4 Nxa4 16.Qxa4 a5 17.Bd2 Re8 18.d5 Nb4 19.Bxb4 axb4 20.Qxb4 Rb8 21.Qc4 Qc8 22.Nd4 Ba6 23.Qc3 c5 24.dxc6 Bxd4 25.Qxd4 Qxc6 26.b4 h6 27.Re3 Re6 28.f3 Rc8 29.Rb3 Bb5 30.Rb2 Qb7 31.Nc2 Qe7 32.Qf2 Rg6 33.Ne3 Qe5 34.Rbb1 Bd7 35.Ra5 Qe7 36.Ra7 Qd8 37.Nd5 Kh7 38.Kh2 Rb8 39.f4 Re6 40.Qd4 Qe8 41.Re1 Bc6 42.Qd3 Qf8 43.Rc1 Bxd5 44.exd5+ Rg6 45.Qf5 Kg8 46.Rac7 Rf6 47.Qd7 Rd8 48.Qxd8 Qxd8 49.Rc8 Qf8 50.R1c4 Rf5 51.Rxf8+ Kxf8 52.Rd4 h5 53.b5 Ke7 54.b6 Kd7 55.g4 hxg4 56.hxg4 Rf6 57.Rc4 1-0

=== Game 19: Karpov-Kasparov, 1/2-1/2 ===
King's Indian (ECO E92)
1.d4 Nf6 2.c4 g6 3.Nc3 Bg7 4.e4 d6 5.Nf3 O-O 6.Be2 e5 7.Be3 c6 8.d5 Ng4 9.Bg5 f6 10.Bh4 Na6 11.Nd2 Nh6 12.a3 Nf7 13.f3 Bh6 14.Bf2 f5 15.Qc2 Bd7 16.b4 c5 17.Rb1 b6 18.Nf1 Bf4 19.g3 Bh6 20.h4 Nc7 21.g4 fxg4 22.fxg4 Bf4 23.Ne3 Ne8 24.Ncd1 h6 25.h5 g5 26.Rg1 Nf6 27.Rg2 Qc8 28.Kf1 Nd8 29.Kg1 Nb7 30.Kh1 cxb4 31.axb4 a5 32.Nf5 Bxf5 33.exf5 axb4 34.Rxb4 Nc5 35.Rxb6 Nce4 36.Rc6 Qb7 37.Be1 Ra1 38.Bf3 Nc5 39.Bc3 Rc1 1/2-1/2

=== Game 20: Kasparov-Karpov, 1-0 ===
Ruy Lopez, Closed (ECO C92)
1.e4 e5 2.Nf3 Nc6 3.Bb5 a6 4.Ba4 Nf6 5.O-O Be7 6.Re1 b5 7.Bb3 d6 8.c3 O-O 9.h3 Bb7 10.d4 Re8 11.Nbd2 Bf8 12.a4 h6 13.Bc2 exd4 14.cxd4 Nb4 15.Bb1 c5 16.d5 Nd7 17.Ra3 f5 18.Rae3 Nf6 19.Nh2 Kh8 20.b3 bxa4 21.bxa4 c4 22.Bb2 fxe4 23.Nxe4 Nfxd5 24.Rg3 Re6 25.Ng4 Qe8 26.Nxh6 c3 27.Nf5 cxb2 28.Qg4 Bc8 29.Qh4+ Rh6 30.Nxh6 gxh6 31.Kh2 Qe5 32.Ng5 Qf6 33.Re8 Bf5 34.Qxh6+ Qxh6 35.Nf7+ Kh7 36.Bxf5+ Qg6 37.Bxg6+ Kg7 38.Rxa8 Be7 39.Rb8 a5 40.Be4+ Kxf7 41.Bxd5+ 1-0

=== Game 21: Karpov-Kasparov, 1/2-1/2 ===
King's Indian, Samisch, Orthodox (ECO E87)
1.d4 Nf6 2.c4 g6 3.Nc3 Bg7 4.e4 d6 5.f3 O-O 6.Be3 e5 7.d5 Nh5 8.Qd2 f5 9.O-O-O a6 10.Bd3 c5 11.dxc6 Nxc6 12.Nd5 Be6 13.Bb6 Qd7 14.Ne2 Rac8 15.Kb1 Qf7 16.Rhe1 Kh8 17.Bc2 Nf6 18.Bd3 Nd7 19.Bg1 Nc5 20.Nb6 Rcd8 21.Nc3 Nd4 22.Ncd5 Bxd5 23.Nxd5 fxe4 24.fxe4 b5 25.Rf1 Qd7 26.cxb5 axb5 27.Rxf8+ Rxf8 28.h3 Qd8 29.Bxd4 exd4 30.Qe2 Qh4 31.Rf1 Re8 32.Rf4 Qg5 33.a3 h5 34.Ka2 b4 35.axb4 Ra8+ 36.Kb1 Nb3 37.Kc2 Na1+ 38.Kb1 Nb3 39.Qf2 Qd8 40.Rf7 Qe8 41.b5 Ra1+ 42.Kc2 Nc5 43.Rxg7 Kxg7 44.Qxd4+ Qe5 45.Qxe5+ dxe5 46.b6 Rg1 47.Ne3 Re1 48.Nc4 Rg1 49.Ne3 Re1 50.Nc4 Rg1 51.b4 Rxg2+ 52.Kc3 Na4+ 53.Kb3 Nxb6 54.Nxb6 Rg3 55.Kc3 Rxh3 56.b5 h4 57.Nc4 Rxd3+ 58.Kxd3 h3 59.b6 h2 60.b7 h1=Q 61.b8=Q Qf1+ 62.Kc3 Qc1+ 63.Kb3 Qd1+ 64.Ka2 Qa4+ 65.Na3 Qxe4 66.Qc7+ Kh6 67.Nc4 Qd5 68.Kb2 e4 69.Qf4+ Kg7 70.Kc3 Qd3+ 71.Kb4 Qd4 72.Qh4 Kf7 73.Kb5 Qd5+ 74.Kb4 Qd4 75.Qh7+ Qg7 76.Qh1 Qd4 77.Qh4 Kg8 78.Qf4 Kg7 79.Qc1 Kf6 80.Kb5 Qd5+ 81.Kb4 Qd4 82.Kb5 Qd5+ 83.Kb6 Qd4+ 84.Kc6 Ke6 85.Ne3 Qa4+ 86.Kb6 Qb4+ 1/2-1/2

=== Game 22: Kasparov-Karpov, 1/2-1/2 ===
Ruy Lopez, Closed (ECO C92)
1.e4 e5 2.Nf3 Nc6 3.Bb5 a6 4.Ba4 Nf6 5.O-O Be7 6.Re1 b5 7.Bb3 d6 8.c3 O-O 9.h3 Bb7 10.d4 Re8 11.Nbd2 Bf8 12.a4 h6 13.Bc2 exd4 14.cxd4 Nb4 15.Bb1 c5 16.d5 Nd7 17.Ra3 f5 18.exf5 Bxd5 19.Ne4 Bf7 20.axb5 d5 21.Nc3 Rxe1+ 22.Nxe1 d4 23.Na2 Nxa2 24.Bxa2 c4 25.Rxa6 Nc5 26.Rxa8 Qxa8 27.Bb1 d3 28.Be3 Qa5 29.b3 Nxb3 30.Nxd3 cxd3 31.Bxd3 Nc5 32.Bf1 Qc7 33.Qg4 Kh7 34.Bc4 Bxc4 35.Qxc4 Qe5 36.Qf7 Bd6 37.g3 Qe7 38.Qg6+ Kh8 39.Bd4 Be5 40.Bxc5 Qxc5 41.Qe8+ Kh7 42.Qg6+ Kh8 43.Qe8+ 1/2-1/2

=== Game 23: Karpov-Kasparov, 1-0 ===
King's Indian, Samisch, Orthodox (ECO E87)
1.d4 Nf6 2.c4 g6 3.Nc3 Bg7 4.e4 d6 5.f3 O-O 6.Be3 e5 7.d5 Nh5 8.Qd2 Qh4+ 9.g3 Qe7 10.O-O-O f5 11.exf5 gxf5 12.Nh3 Na6 13.Rg1 Nf6 14.Nf2 Kh8 15.Be2 Bd7 16.Bg5 Nc5 17.g4 e4 18.fxe4 fxe4 19.Be3 Na4 20.g5 Nxc3 21.bxc3 Ng8 22.Ng4 c5 23.dxc6 Bxc6 24.h4 d5 25.cxd5 Bxd5 26.Qxd5 Rac8 27.Qd6 Rxc3+ 28.Kb1 Qf7 29.Bd4 1-0

=== Game 24: Kasparov-Karpov, 1/2-1/2 ===
English (ECO A17)
1.Nf3 Nf6 2.c4 e6 3.Nc3 Bb4 4.Qc2 O-O 5.a3 Bxc3 6.Qxc3 b6 7.b4 d6 8.Bb2 Bb7 9.g3 c5 10.Bg2 Nbd7 11.O-O Rc8 12.d3 Re8 13.e4 a6 14.Qb3 b5 15.Nd2 Rb8 16.Rfc1 Ba8 17.Qd1 Qe7 18.cxb5 axb5 19.Nb3 e5 20.f3 h5 21.bxc5 dxc5 22.a4 h4 23.g4 c4 24.dxc4 bxa4 25.Ba3 Qd8 26.Nc5 Bc6 27.Nxa4 Nh7 28.Nc5 Ng5 29.Nxd7 Bxd7 30.Rc3 Qa5 31.Rd3 Ba4 32.Qe1 Qa6 33.Bc1 Ne6 34.Rda3 Nc5 35.Be3 Qd6 36.Rxa4 1/2-1/2
