= Dragan Barlov =

Serbian chess grandmaster (born 1957)

Personal information
- Born: 30 January 1957 (age 69) Kragujevac, Serbia

Chess career
- Country: Yugoslavia → Serbia
- Title: Grandmaster (1986)
- Peak rating: 2555 (July 1987)

Dragan Barlov (Serbian: Драган Барлов, born 30 January 1957) is a Serbian chess grandmaster having earned the title in 1986. He won the Yugoslav Chess Championship title in 1986 and earned a silver medal in the European Team Chess Championships in 1989.

== Biography ==
Dragan Barlov was one of the leading chess players in Yugoslavia in the 1980s. In 1986, he won Yugoslav Chess Championship. Additionally he has won two bronze medals in the same tournament (1982, 1989). In 1987 in Zagreb Dragan Barlov participated in the World Chess Championship Interzonal Tournament where ranked in 15th place.

Dragan Barlov has won many international chess tournaments, including winning or sharing first place in Hallsberg (1975), Zürich (1983), Nuremberg (1990), Caorle (1991), Poio (2002), Las Palmas (1993 - B tournament, 2008).

Dragan Barlov played for Yugoslavia in the Chess Olympiads:

- In 1986, at first reserve board in the 27th Chess Olympiad in Dubai (+4, =2, -3),
- In 1990, at first reserve board in the 29th Chess Olympiad in Novi Sad (+2, =3, -2).

Dragan Barlov played for Yugoslavia in the European Team Chess Championship:

- In 1989, at sixth board in the 9th European Team Chess Championship in Haifa (+4, =2, -1) and won team silver medal.

Dragan Barlov played for Yugoslavia in the Men's Chess Balkaniads:

- In 1982, at fifth board in the 14th Chess Balkaniad in Plovdiv (+4, =1, -0) and won team silver and individual gold medals,
- In 1988, at fourth board in the 19th Chess Balkaniad in Kaštel Stari (+0, =5, -1) and won team silver and individual bronze medals.

In 1982, he was awarded the FIDE International Master (IM) title and received the FIDE Grandmaster (GM) title four years later.
