= Fletcher Baragar =

Canadian chess player

Personal information
- Born: 26 October 1955 (age 70)

Chess career
- Country: Canada
- Title: FIDE Master (1987)
- Peak rating: 2320 (January 1987)

Fletcher Baragar (born 26 October 1955) is a Canadian chess player who holds the title of FIDE Master (FM) (1987). He is a professor of economics.

== Biography ==
In 1987 in Zagreb, Fletcher Baragar participated in the World Chess Championship Interzonal Tournament, where he ranked in 17th place. He won the Manitoba Open Chess Championship and Manitoba Chess Championship in 1994 and 1996.

Fletcher Baragar played for Canada in the World Student Team Chess Championship:

- in 1977, at the second board in the 22nd World Student Team Chess Championship in Mexico City (+3, =2, -4).

Fletcher Baragar played for Canada in the World Youth U26 Team Chess Championships:

- in 1978, at the second reserve board in the 1st World Youth U26 Team Chess Championship in Mexico City (+4, =2, -2),
- in 1980, at the second reserve board in the 2nd World Youth U26 Team Chess Championship in Mexico City (+3, =2, -2).

Fletcher Baragar worked as Economics and Society Stream Professor of the University of Manitoba. His interests and areas of specialization include Marxian economics, the history of economic thought, and macroeconomics.
