= Ahmed Ibrahim Hamed =

Egyptian chess player (born 1954)

Personal information
- Born: 12 January 1954 (age 72)

Chess career
- Country: Egypt
- Title: International Master (1987)
- Peak rating: 2349 (January 1999)

Ahmed Ibrahim Hamed (born 12 January 1954) is an Egyptian chess International Master (1987).

== Chess career ==
From the early 1980s to the end of 1990s, Hamed was one of Egypt's leading chess players. In 1987 in Subotica he participated in the World Chess Championship Interzonal Tournament where ranked in 16th place.

Hamed played for Egypt in the Chess Olympiads:

- In 1980, at second reserve board in the 24th Chess Olympiad in La Valletta (+1, =0, -3),
- In 1984, at first reserve board in the 26th Chess Olympiad in Thessaloniki (+5, =3, -3),
- In 1990, at first reserve board in the 29th Chess Olympiad in Novi Sad (+3, =1, -4),
- In 1998, at second reserve board in the 33rd Chess Olympiad in Elista (+3, =2, -2).

Hamed was awarded the International Master (IM) title in 1987.
