= Robin Swinkels =

Dutch chess grandmaster (born 1989)

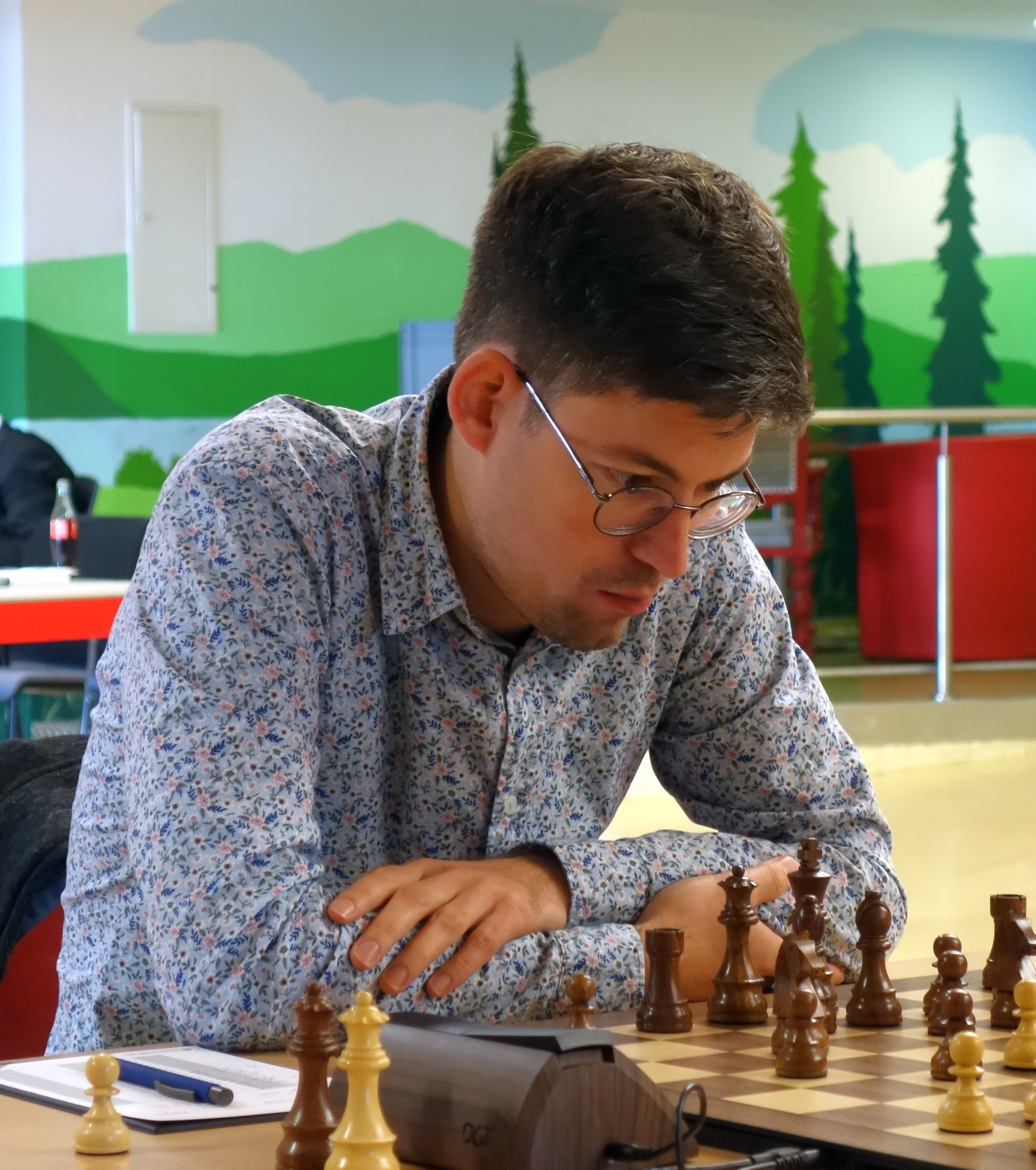
- Swinkels in 2023

Personal information
- Born: April 6, 1989 (age 37) Asten, Netherlands

Chess career
- Country: Netherlands
- Title: Grandmaster (2009)
- FIDE rating: 2481 (July 2026)
- Peak rating: 2536 (October 2013)

Robin Swinkels (born April 6, 1989) is a Dutch chess grandmaster.

== Chess career ==
In July 2008, he played an underwater chess match against Hans Böhm as part of the Curaçao Chess Festival.

In January 2010, he participated in the Tata Steel Chess Tournament, where he defeated Benjamin Bok, Nils Grandelius, Mariya Muzychuk, Sjoerd Plukkel, and Soumya Swaminathan.

In 2017, he played for DJK Aachen in the Chess Bundesliga, where he defeated Alexander Belezky in the first round.

He was one of the four players who qualified for the finals in the 2021 Dutch Chess Championship, though was defeated by eventual winner Max Warmerdam.
