= Stefan Mohr =

German chess player (born 1967)

Stefan Mohr (born 22 October 1967) is a German chess grandmaster (GM). Mohr earned the GM title in 1989. He shared third place at Budapest 1989. He was also second board reserve for the bronze medal winning German team at the 1989 European Team Chess Championship.
