= Michał Olszewski (chess player) =

Polish chess grandmaster (born 1989)

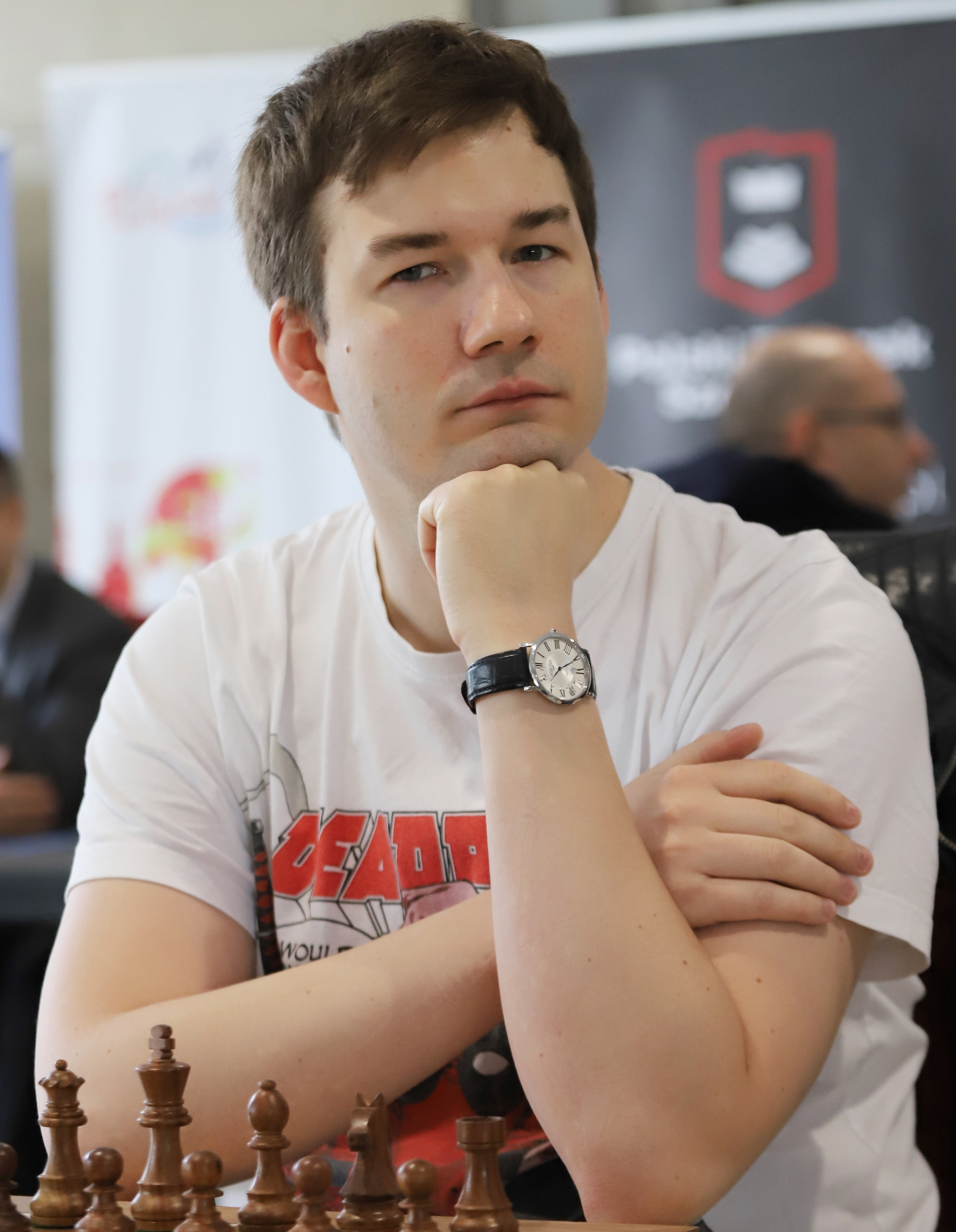
- Olszewski in 2021

Personal information
- Born: September 23, 1989 (age 36) Warsaw, Poland

Chess career
- Country: Poland
- Title: Grandmaster (2009)
- FIDE rating: 2509 (July 2026)
- Peak rating: 2571 (April 2015)

Michał Olszewski (born 1989 in Warsaw) is a Polish chess player holding the title of Grandmaster. He won the bronze medal at the 2009 World Junior Chess Championship played in Argentina.
