= Luc Winants =

Belgian chess grandmaster (1963–2023)

Personal information
- Born: 1 January 1963 Watermael-Boitsfort, Belgium
- Died: 7 February 2023 (aged 60)

Chess career
- Country: Belgium
- Title: Grandmaster (1998)
- Peak rating: 2574 (March 2016)

Luc Winants (1 January 1963 – 7 February 2023) was a Belgian chess player. He became an International Master in 1986 and an International Grandmaster in 1998. At the time of his death, he had an Elo rating of 2512.

== Biography ==
Winants earned the title of International Master in 1986 from FIDE with standards met at the 26th Chess Olympiad in Thessaloniki and the Belgian Chess Championship in Anderlecht in 1986. He became a Grandmaster two years later. He took part in eight Chess Olympiad tournaments with the Belgian national team, concluding in 2012 and 2014. He took second prize at the Cappelle-la-Grande Open in 2002. In addition to his career in tournaments, he wrote a weekly column on chess in La Libre Belgique.

Winants died on 7 February 2023, at the age of 60.
