= Sven Kivisildnik =

Estonian writer, politician, and journalist (born 1964)

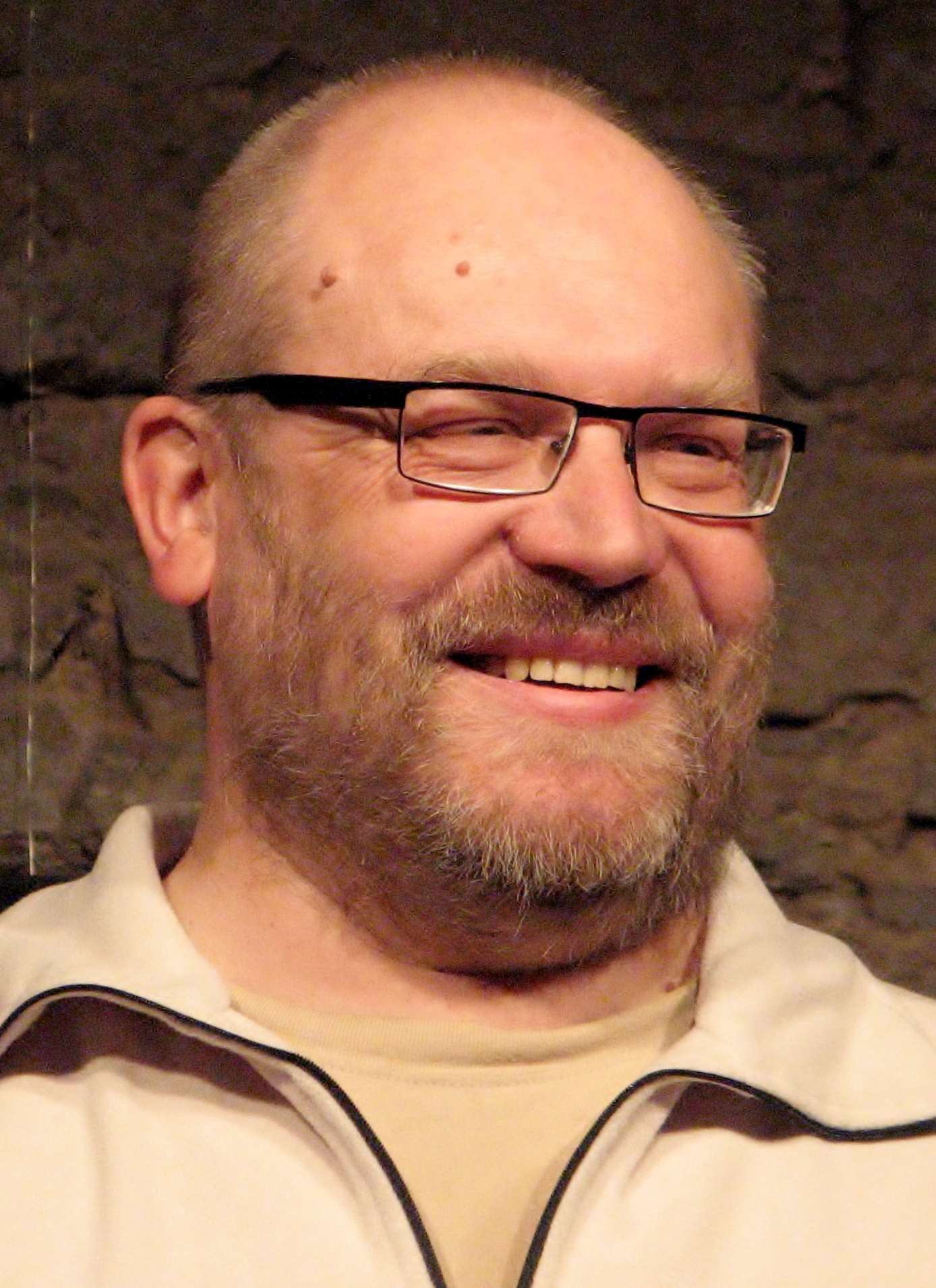
- Kivisildnik in 2014

Member of the Pärnu City Council
- Incumbent
- Assumed office 4 October 2022

Chairman of the Estonian Independence Party
- In office 2015–2022

Vice Chairman of the Estonian Independence Party
- In office 2009–2015

Secretary General of Estonian Independence Party
- In office 2006–2009

Personal details
- Born: Sven Sildnik; 3 January 1964 (age 62) Rakvere, then part of Estonian SSR, Soviet Union
- Party: Estonian Conservative People's Party (2022–present)
- Other political affiliations: Estonian Independence Party (until 2022)
- Education: University of Tartu

Sven Kivisildnik (born Sven Sildnik; 3 January 1964) is an Estonian writer, journalist and politician.

== Biography ==
Kivisildnik was born 3 January 1964 in Rakvere, Estonian SSR.

He has studied journalism at University of Tartu. He is a member of two literary groups: Hirohall and Estonian Kostabi-Society.

He is managing the publishing house Jumalikud Ilmutused.

He was Secretary General of the Estonian Independence Party (EIB) from 2006 to 2009 and was Vice Chairman from 2009 to 2015.

At the general meeting of the party held on 18 April 2015, he was elected chairman of the party.

On 4 October 2022 he joined the Estonian Conservative People's Party and was elected to the Pärnu City Council.

Awards:

- 2007: annual poetry award of the Estonian Cultural Endowment

== Works ==
- "Märg Viktor" (1989)
- "Dawa vita" (1991)
- "Nagu härjale punane kärbseseen" (1996)
- "Loomade peal katsetatud inimene" (1997)
- "Kutse" (1997)
- "Päike, mida sa õhtul teed" (2003)
- "Rahvuseepos Kalevipoeg ehk Armastus" (2003)
- "Null tolerants" (2004)
- "Otsin naist: koledatel, vaestel, vanadel ja kiimalistel mitte tülitada" (2004)
- "Poeem Puutinile" (2004)
- "Valitud teosed I, jutustused ja romaanid 1984–2004" (2004)
- "Vägistatud jäämägi" (2006)
