= Jaan Ehlvest =

Estonian-American chess grandmaster (born 1962)

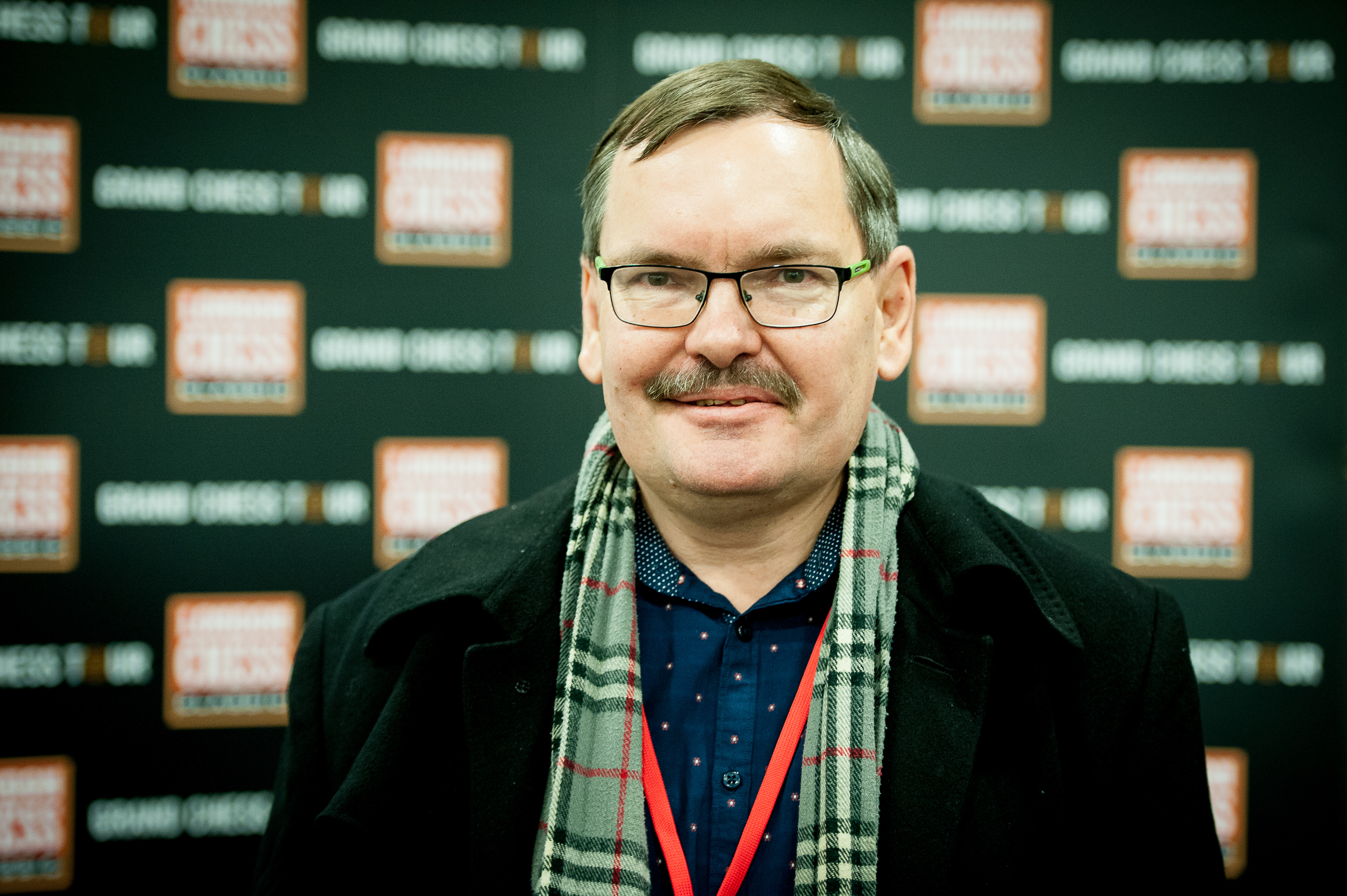

Personal information
- Born: 14 October 1962 (age 64) Tallinn, then part of Estonian SSR, Soviet Union

Chess career
- Country: Soviet Union (before 1991); Estonia (1991–2006); United States (after 2006)
- Title: Grandmaster (1987)
- FIDE rating: 2534 (November 2026)
- Peak rating: 2660 (January 1996)
- Peak ranking: No. 6 (July 1990)

Jaan Ehlvest (born 14 October 1962) is an Estonian-American chess player. He was awarded the title Grandmaster by FIDE in 1987. Ehlvest was Estonian champion in 1986. Since 2006, he has represented the United States.

He was named Estonian Athlete of the Year in 1987 and 1989. From July 1990 to July 1991, he was among the top 10 on the FIDE world rankings, peaking at number 5 in the list of January 1991.

== Career ==
Ehlvest's tournament victories include the 1980 USSR Junior Chess Championship, the 1983 European Junior Championship, the 1986 Estonian Championship, the 1994 New York Open, and the 2003 World Open in Philadelphia, Pennsylvania. In 1989, Ehlvest placed fourth in the GMA Chess World Cup series. In 1997 and 2000, Ehlvest tied for first place at the U.S. Masters Chess Championship.

He was a member of the gold medal-winning Soviet Union team at the 28th Chess Olympiad in Thessaloniki 1988 and played for Estonia in the Chess Olympiads of 1992–2004.. When SK Rockaden won the 2001 Swedish championship they fielded Ehlvest..

In 2006, unsatisfied with the lack of support from the Estonian Chess Federation, Ehlvest decided to move to the United States; since then, he has been a member of the USCF and competed internationally for the US.

In March 2007, Ehlvest accepted an invitation to play an eight-game match against the chess program Rybka, one of the strongest chess programs in existence. He was playing Black in all games, but was given pawn odds (Rybka was playing each game a pawn down; a different white pawn was removed in each game). He lost the match by 2½:5½ (+1−4=3). In a following rematch, the pawn odds were removed, Ehlvest was given White in every game, twice the time on the clock, and significant computational handicaps were placed on the machine. Ehlvest lost decisively, 1½:4½.

In 2008 he won the Pan American-Continental Championship, which took place in Boca Raton, Florida.

== Personal life ==
Ehlvest's younger brother, Jüri Ehlvest, was a well-known writer in Estonia.

Ehlvest studied psychology at Tartu State University (now, University of Tartu). In 2004, Ehlvest published his autobiography, The Story of a Chess Player. While U.S. citizen, he spends most of his time in Estonia.

Awards and achievements
Preceded by Heino Puuste	Estonian Sportsman of the Year; 1987	Succeeded by Allar Levandi
Preceded by Allar Levandi	Estonian Sportsman of the Year; 1989	Succeeded by Jüri Jaanson
