= World Chess Championship 2026 =

Upcoming chess match between Gukesh Dommaraju and Javokhir Sindarov

- Fondation Martin Bodmer, Cologny, Switzerland
- 24 November – 12 December 2026
	Defending champion	Challenger
	(India) Gukesh Dommaraju	(Uzbekistan) Javokhir Sindarov
	Born 29 May 2006; 20 years old	Born 8 December 2005; 20/21 years old
	Winner of the World Chess Championship 2024	Winner of the Candidates Tournament 2026
	Rating: 2710 (World No. 26)	Rating: 2782 (World No. 4)

The World Chess Championship 2026 is an upcoming chess match to determine the World Chess Champion. It will be played between the defending champion, Gukesh Dommaraju, and the challenger, Javokhir Sindarov, the winner of the Candidates Tournament 2026. The match is set to take place between 24 November and 12 December 2026 in Cologny, Geneva, Switzerland.

== Defending champion ==
After defeating Ding Liren in the 2024 championship match, Gukesh has been noted for his poor form in both classical and faster time controls. After achieving a peak rating of 2794, he went on to lose 43 rating points altogether in 2025 by placing 41st at the 2025 FIDE Grand Swiss Tournament and by exiting in the 3rd round of the 2025 Chess World Cup as the first seed of the latter event. His form has garnered criticism from former world champions Magnus Carlsen and Garry Kasparov, as the latter highlighted the differences in strength between the reign of Gukesh compared to other world champions, including himself. Carlsen further expanded on his criticism in an interview with chess.com in September 2026, stating that, given Gukesh's form, Sindarov was "a pretty significant favorite" and that "[Gukesh's] evaluations are way too optimistic. That makes him take way more chances than he should. I think especially now his confidence hasn’t been too high, he just tries to do a little bit too much". However, Gukesh's opponent Sindarov fended off external opinions on Gukesh's form, stating in an interview with Reuters that "he is very strong. I played with him a few times and I really feel he is a very strong player". He also referenced Ding's resurging performance in the 2024 championship match, highlighting that "recent form offered little indication of how the championship would unfold".

After a rough stretch of results in 2026 at the Tata Steel Masters and that year's Prague Chess Masters, where he finished in joint-last place with 3½/9 points, Gukesh announced his withdrawal from the classical events of the 2026 Grand Chess Tour. In June 2026, Gukesh reflected on his form in an interview with Hindustan Times where he described it as an "elephant in the room" and that the situation overall was "not looking great". He further expanded on these statements by stating that he is now "trying to find a more internal source of motivation, one less dependent on results". He then finished last at both Norway Chess 2026 and Chennai Grand Masters 2026, to end on a rating of 2703. Despite the setbacks, both Viswanathan Anand and Srinath Narayanan highlighted before the conclusion of the latter tournament that the upcoming Chess Olympiad will be an important factor towards regaining his form.

Playing on board 4 for India and looking to defend the contingent's open event Olympiad title from the 2024 edition, Gukesh's form improved as he notably scored a win in the decider match against Germany's Alexander Donchenko in round 9 of the event and subsequently maintained India's contention for the gold medal by defeating Sindarov's compatriot Ortik Nigmatov in the penultimate round. Heading into the final round of the event with an undefeated record, Gukesh went on to lose his game against Hungary's Gleb Dudin, though the Indian team secured a 2nd place finish at the open event over Germany by tiebreaks.

Heading into the world championship match with a classical rating of 2710, Gukesh surpassed Ding to become the lowest-rated reigning World Chess Champion since the introduction of the Elo rating system in 1971, and the 22-position gap in the rating list between Gukesh and Sindarov is the widest of any championship match since the title was reunified in 2006.

== Candidates Tournament ==
The challenger, Javokhir Sindarov, qualified by winning the Candidates Tournament 2026, which was held at the Cap Saint Georges Hotel and Resort in Pegeia, Cyprus, between 28 March and 16 April.

The eight players to qualify to the Candidates Tournament were:

Qualification method	Player	Age	Rating	World ranking
Qualification method	Player	(March 2026)		
2024 FIDE Circuit winner	(United States) Fabiano Caruana	34	2795	3
Top two finishers of the 2025 FIDE Grand Swiss	(Netherlands) Anish Giri (winner)	32	2753	8
Top two finishers of the 2025 FIDE Grand Swiss	(Germany) Matthias Blübaum (runner-up)	29	2698	33
Top three finishers of the 2025 FIDE World Cup	(Uzbekistan) Javokhir Sindarov (winner)	20	2745	13
Top three finishers of the 2025 FIDE World Cup	(China) Wei Yi (runner-up)	27	2754	7
Top three finishers of the 2025 FIDE World Cup	(FIDE) Andrey Esipenko (Note: Esipenko is Russian. However, he plays under the FIDE flag because FIDE has banned the display of the Russian flag in international chess competitions since 27 February 2022, in response to the ongoing Russian invasion of Ukraine.) (third place)	24	2698	34
2025 FIDE Circuit winner	(India) R Praggnanandhaa	21	2741	14
Highest average rating (Aug 2025 – Jan 2026) (Note: Provided the player has played at least 40 games rated for the February 2025 through January 2026 standard rating lists, including at least 15 in any of the six consecutive lists from August 2025 to January 2026.)	(United States) Hikaru Nakamura	38	2810	2

Unlike other Candidates Tournaments, and any FIDE World Championship cycle (except 1999–2004 during the split-title period), there was no automatic spot for the runner-up of the previous Championship (Ding Liren). To compensate, the 2024 championship was considered an eligible tournament for the FIDE Circuit, with the runner-up obtaining special bonus points for the 2025 FIDE Circuit based on his score.

=== Results ===
Standings of the 2026 Candidates Tournament
Rank	Player	Score	SB	Wins	Qualification	JS		AG		FC		WY		HN		MB		RP		AE	
1	Javokhir Sindarov (UZB)	10 / 14	64.75	6	Advanced to title match			½	½	1	½	½	1	½	1	½	½	1	1	1	½
2	Anish Giri (NED)	8.5 / 14	56.5	4		½	½			½	1	½	½	½	½	½	1	1	0	½	1
3	Fabiano Caruana (USA)	7.5 / 14	48	4		½	0	0	½			1	½	1	0	1	½	½	½	½	1
4	Wei Yi (CHN)	7 / 14	44.75	2		0	½	½	½	½	0			½	½	½	½	½	½	1	1
5	Hikaru Nakamura (USA)	6.5 / 14	44.5	1		0	½	½	½	1	0	½	½			½	½	½	½	½	½
6	Matthias Blübaum (GER)	6 / 14	42	0		½	½	0	½	½	0	½	½	½	½			½	½	½	½
7	R Praggnanandhaa (IND)	6 / 14	40	1		0	0	1	0	½	½	½	½	½	½	½	½			½	½
8	Andrey Esipenko (FIDE)	4.5 / 14	31.5	0		½	0	0	½	0	½	0	0	½	½	½	½	½	½		

Source: FIDE
Rules for classification: For first place: tie-break games. For subsequent spots: (1) results in tie-break games for first place, if any; (2) Sonneborn–Berger score (SB); (3) total number of wins; (4) head-to-head score among tied players; (5) drawing of lots.
Note: Numbers in the crosstable in a white background indicate the result playing the respective opponent with the white pieces (black pieces if on a black background). This does not give information which of the two games was played in the first half of the tournament, and which in the second.

== Championship match ==
=== Organisation ===
Bids for the hosting of the World Championship were to be presented to FIDE no later than 31 May 2026, but the deadline was later extended to 21 June. Acting president of FIDE Viswanathan Anand revealed that several countries, including India, the United States, and Cyprus expressed interest in hosting the event. It was then announced on 28 July that Geneva, Switzerland was originally chosen to host the match from 24 November to 12 December 2026, which marked the first time since 2004 that a world chess championship match will take place in Switzerland. It was later revealed, however, that the Fondation Martin Bodmer, located in Cologny was chosen as the venue to host the match.

Software company Salesforce was announced as the main sponsor of the match, with Freedom Holding owned by incumbent president of FIDE Timur Turlov serving as the general partner.

=== Prize fund ===
The prize fund allocated for the event is US$2.5 million, unchanged from 2024. Each player would receive US$200,000 for each game won (including forfeits), and the remainder of the money will be distributed equally except if the score is 7.5–6.5 after 13 decisive games or 8–6 after 14 rounds, in which case the winner would receive US$1.3 million and the runner-up would receive US$1.2 million, which is the same amount of money the winner and runner-up would receive if the tournament went to tie-breaks.

=== Format ===
Each of the 14 classical games shall be played with 120 minutes for each player since the first move, with 30 minutes added on each player's clock after black's 40th move, and 30 seconds added on each player's clock per move from 41st move. Drawing of colors shall take place at the opening ceremony or before as decided by FIDE. The colors drawn for the first game apply to all odd-ordered games and are reversed for all even ordered games.

Players are not allowed to agree upon a draw before black's 40th move. Any draw occurred before black's 40th move is permitted only if it is due to threefold repetition or stalemate and if approved by the Chief Arbiter or Deputy Arbiter.

==== Tiebreaks ====
If the score after 14 classical games remains equal (7 each), a set of 4 rapid games shall be played with the time control of 15 minutes each player + 10 seconds of increment each player per move. If the score remains equal, a set of 2 rapid games shall be played with 10 minutes each player + 5 seconds of increment each player per move. If draw still remains, a set of 2 blitz games shall be played with the time control of 3 minutes each player + 2 seconds of increment each player per move. If draw still remains, a series of single game elimination matches shall be played in the same blitz format with the first game's colour drawn and reversed after each game until a decisive result occurs.

=== Previous head-to-head record ===
Prior to the match, Gukesh and Sindarov had played against each other three times in classical time controls. Sindarov won two games, one notably with the white pieces four years prior during the 2022 edition of the Sharjah Masters. Their most recent pre-championship game was during the 2026 Tata Steel Masters, which ended in a 78-move draw.

Head-to-head record
		Gukesh wins	Draw	Sindarov wins	Total
Classical	Gukesh (white) – Sindarov (black)	0	0	1	1
Classical	Sindarov (white) – Gukesh (black)	0	1	1	2
Classical	Total	0	1	2	3
Blitz / rapid / exhibition		1	1	2	4
Total		1	2	4	7

=== Seconds ===
In the pre-match press conference, Sindarov named longtime coach Roman Vidonyak, Nikita Vitiugov, and Mukhiddin Madaminov, who served as his main second for the 2025 Chess World Cup and the 2026 Candidates Tournament, as part of his team for the event. Gukesh retained his coach Grzegorz Gajewski and mental conditioning coach Paddy Upton from the 2024 match for his first title defence.

=== Schedule ===
The table below states the dates of the events. All the games (except tie-breaks, if taken place, whose time is yet to be decided) shall start at 15:00 CET (UTC+1:00). If a player scores 7.5 or 8 points before 14 games are played, then he shall be declared the winner and the rest of the games shall not be played.

Date	Event
Sunday, 22 November	Media day and opening ceremony
Monday, 23 November	Media day and technical meeting
Tuesday, 24 November	Game 1
Wednesday, 25 November	Game 2
Thursday, 26 November	Game 3
Friday, 27 November	Rest day
Saturday, 28 November	Game 4
Sunday, 29 November	Game 5
Monday, 30 November	Game 6
Tuesday, 1 December	Rest day
Wednesday, 2 December	Game 7
Thursday, 3 December	Game 8
Friday, 4 December	Game 9 (If required)
Saturday, 5 December	Rest day
Sunday, 6 December	Game 10 (If required)
Monday, 7 December	Game 11 (If required)
Tuesday, 8 December	Game 12 (If required)
Wednesday, 9 December	Rest day
Thursday, 10 December	Game 13 (If required)
Friday, 11 December	Game 14 (If required)
Saturday, 12 December	Tie-breaks (If required), Closing ceremony

If the match ends in less than fourteen games, then the closing ceremony may be moved forward.

=== Results ===
World Chess Championship 2026
	Rating	Match games														Points
	Rating	1	2	3	4	5	6	7	8	9	10	11	12	13	14	Points
Javokhir Sindarov (UZB)	2782															
Gukesh Dommaraju (IND)	2710															

== See also ==
- Women's World Chess Championship 2027
