= Amish (disambiguation) =

The Amish are an Anabaptist Christian denomination and its offshoots.

Amish may also refer to:

- Amish, Iowa, United States
- The Amish (film), a 2012 documentary film

== People with the given name ==
- Amish Devgan, Indian journalist
- Amish Saheba, Indian cricket umpire and player
- Amish Shah, American politician and physician
- Amish Sidhu, Indian cricketer
- Amish Tripathi, Indian author

== See also ==
- Amisha, Indian feminine given name
