= Anish Giri =

Dutch chess grandmaster (born 1994)

- Giri at the 2026 Chess Olympiad

Personal information
- Born: Anish Kumar Giri; 28 June 1994 (age 32) Saint Petersburg, Russia
- Spouse: Sopiko Guramishvili (m. 2015)
- Children: 3

Chess career
- Country: Russia (until 2009); Netherlands (since 2009)
- Title: Grandmaster (2009)
- FIDE rating: 2747 (November 2026)
- Peak rating: 2798 (October 2015)
- Ranking: No. 11 (November 2026)
- Peak ranking: No. 3 (January 2016)

Anish Kumar Giri (born 28 June 1994) is a Dutch chess grandmaster. A former chess prodigy, he completed the requirements for the grandmaster title in 2009 at the age of 14 years, 7 months and 2 days. Giri is a five-time Dutch champion (2009, 2011, 2012, 2015, and 2023), and has represented the Netherlands at eight consecutive Chess Olympiads (2010–2026).

As of April 2026, Giri is the No. 1 ranked player in the Netherlands, having switched from Russia in 2009. He has also won major international tournaments, most notably the 2023 Tata Steel Chess Tournament becoming the fourth Dutch player since 1968 (after Gennadi Sosonko, Jan Timman, and Jorden van Foreest), and 14th Dutch player overall, to do so. After previously qualifying for and competing in the 2016 and 2020 Candidates Tournaments by having one of the highest average ratings, Giri won the FIDE Grand Swiss Tournament 2025 in September 2025, qualifying him for the Candidates Tournament 2026.

== Early life ==
Giri was born in Saint Petersburg on 28 June 1994 to a Russian mother, Olga, and Nepalese-Indian father, Sanjay Giri. His paternal grandmother is Indian.

He moved to Sapporo, Japan, with his parents in 2002 and lived there until 2008. Since February 2008, Giri and his family have lived in the Dutch town of Rijswijk, where his father worked at a research and consulting foundation. In June 2013, Giri graduated from Grotius College in Delft.

== Chess career ==
Giri began playing chess with his mother at age six. By age 11, he was rated above 2100 (mid-level expert; just below master) and continued to grow stronger. Giri's first club was a local youth sport club DYUSSH-2 in Saint Petersburg, where his trainers were Asya Kovalyova and Andrei Praslov. He was a member of the Japan Chess Association and Sapporo Chess Club during his stay in Japan. In 2004, he won the Sapporo Chess Championship.

Giri developed quickly as a junior, his rating increasing rapidly between April 2006 and July 2010 from 2114 to 2672. Giri worked with trainer Vladimir Chuchelov between 2009–2012 and resumed in 2017. Giri also worked with Vladimir Tukmakov between 2013 and 2016.

=== 2007–2008 ===
Giri shared first place in the Russian Higher League Under-14s Boys Championship scoring 6½/9, winning the Saint Petersburg Boys Under 16s and coming third in the Under 18s event in 2007. The next year saw him share first at the Blokadny Saint Petersburg Open and win the Petrograd Winter Open scoring 8½/9. He followed with his first Grandmaster norm, achieved at the Intomart GfK Open sharing first with 7/9 in April 2008, sharing second at Kunsthalle GM Open and reaching his second Grandmaster norm at Groningen by sharing fourth place with 6½/9.

=== 2009 ===
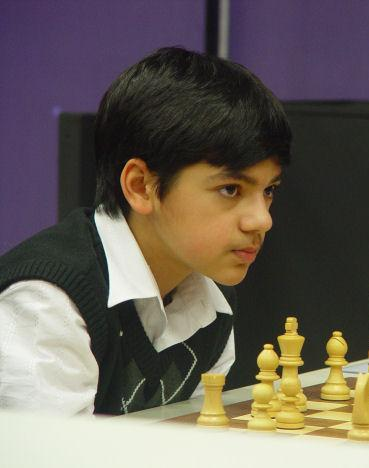
Giri at the 2009 Corus Chess Tournament in Wijk aan Zee

Giri's first appearance at a major tournament came in his shared second place at Corus Chess Group C in January 2009 giving him his third GM norm, his Grandmaster status being confirmed in June. He also shared second at the Dutch Open, won the Dutch Championship and shared second at the Unive tournament.

=== 2010 ===
His performance in the previous year's Corus Chess Group C earned him a spot in Group B in 2010. He won the tournament with a score of 9/13, half a point ahead of Arkadij Naiditsch. Despite a disappointing result in the European Individual Championships, he drew a match with Nigel Short and won the Sigeman & Co tournament scoring 4½/5, coming second in the Dutch Championships behind Erwin L'Ami and was one of the best scorers for the Rising Stars team during the NH tournament against the Experienced team, but was unable to qualify for the Melody Amber tournament, losing on tiebreaks against Hikaru Nakamura.

It was revealed in May 2010 that Giri had aided Viswanathan Anand in preparation for the World Chess Championship 2010 against challenger Veselin Topalov. Anand won the match 6½–5½ to retain the title.

=== 2011 ===
At his debut appearance at Tata Steel in 2011 he scored 6½/13 (+2–2=9) and defeated Magnus Carlsen with Black in 22 moves. He also became Dutch champion for the second time and shared first place at Sigeman & Co with Wesley So and Hans Tikkanen.

=== 2012–2013 ===
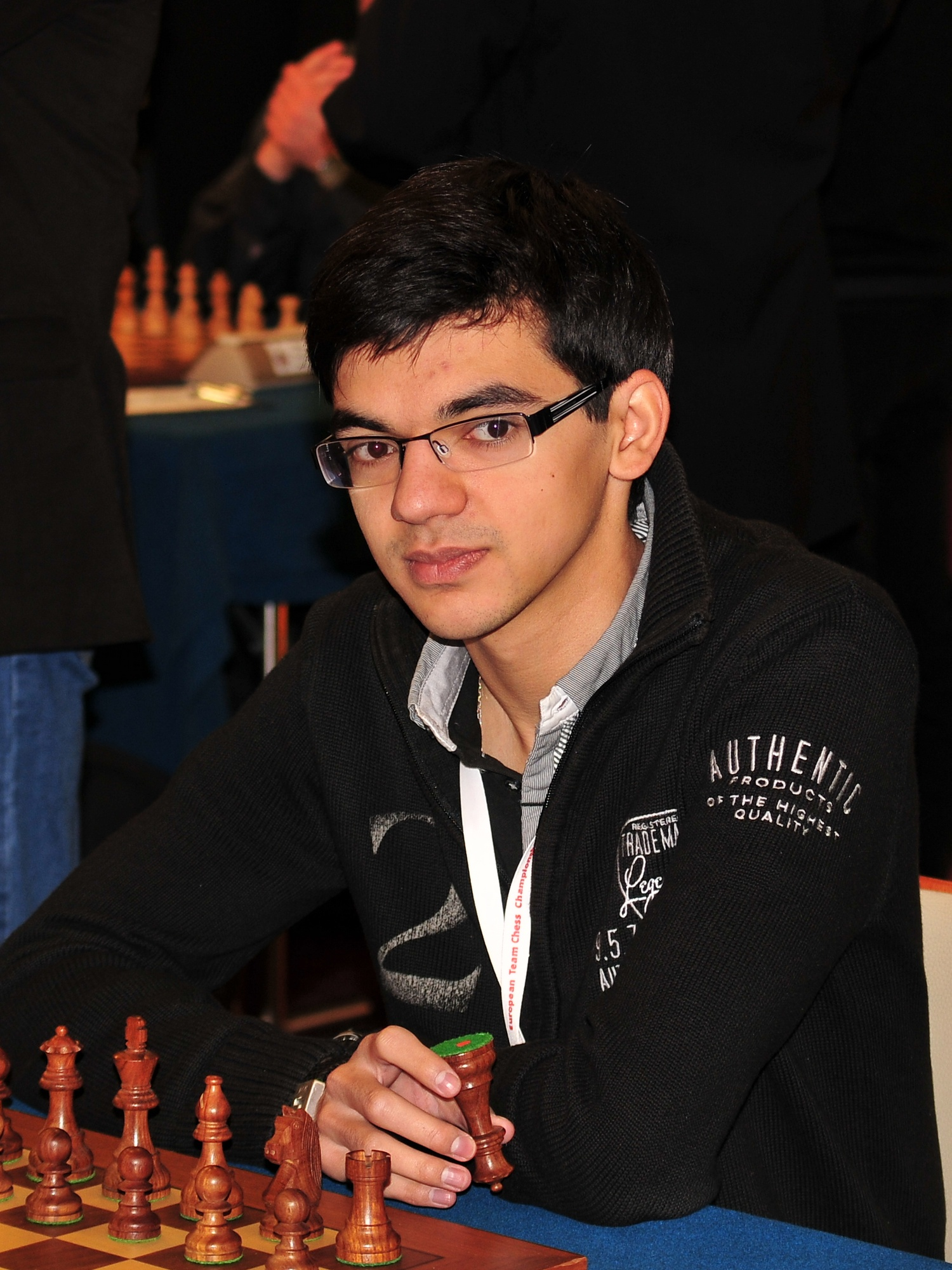
Giri at the 2013 European Chess Team Championship

Despite being the lowest ranked player, Giri won the 2012 Reggio Emilia chess tournament, claimed his third Dutch championship and shared third place at the strong Biel Chess Festival. His solid improvement continued with fourth place at the Reykjavik Open and a match victory against Vassily Ivanchuk at Leon in 2013. Giri took part in the 2012/13 FIDE Grand Prix cycle, but failed to qualify for the Candidates Tournament.

=== 2014–2015 ===
In 2014, Giri shared second place at the Tata Steel tournament and won individual bronze for his first board performance at the 41st Chess Olympiad in Tromsø and finished second at the strong Qatar Masters Open.

In February 2015, Giri briefly crossed the 2800 mark in the live FIDE ratings by beating Peter Svidler at the FIDE Grand Prix in Tbilisi, but did not maintain the ranking level until the end of the month to appear in the official ratings. Giri participated in the 2014/15 FIDE Grand Prix cycle, but again failed to qualify for the Candidates Tournament.

=== 2016 ===
In March 2016, Giri participated in the Candidates Tournament 2016 in Moscow after qualifying (for the first time) as one of the two players with the highest average ratings for 2015. At the tournament, he drew all 14 games and was the only player in the tournament to go undefeated. He went to the tournament with his wife Sopiko Guramishvili and his coach Vladimir Tukmakov.

Since 2016, Giri has been sponsored by the proprietary trading firm Optiver.

=== 2017 ===
Giri at the 2017 Reykjavik Open

Giri finished sixth in Norway Chess with a score of 4½/9, scoring wins against Maxime-Vachier Lagrave and Anand but lost a "crash and burn" game in 17 moves versus Vladimir Kramnik. In April 2017, Giri won the Reykjavik Open with a score of 8½/10 (+7–0=3). He placed fourth in Your Next Move (Rapid and Blitz), Leuven, winning €15,000, his only appearance on the Grand Chess Tour of that year. In the FIDE Grand Prix, he placed ninth in Moscow, fifth in Geneva and thirteenth in La Palma, ending up twelfth overall. He reached the fourth round Section 3 of the Chess World Cup, losing to Vassily Ivanchuk in a tie-break. He won the European Club Cup as part of team Globus, alongside, among others, Kramnik, Alexander Grischuk and Sergey Karjakin.

=== 2018 ===
Giri started off 2018 by placing joint-first with Carlsen on a score of 9/13 (+5–0=8) at the 80th Tata Steel Masters. He was defeated in the blitz tie-break by Carlsen 1½–½.

In April 2018, he participated in the fifth edition of Shamkir Chess, finishing sixth with a score of 4½/9 (+1–1=7).

In July 2018, he competed in the 46th Dortmund Sparkassen Chess Meeting, placing second with a score of 4/7 (+2–1=4).

In November 2018, he shared first in the 2nd Dute Cup in Shenzhen, together with Vachier-Lagrave and Ding Liren and took second place on tie-break.

=== 2019 ===
Giri competed in the 81st Tata Steel Masters in January 2019, placing clear second with 8½/13 (+5−1=7), losing to Ian Nepomniachtchi in the first round.

In March 2019, Giri won the 3rd edition of the Shenzhen Masters (Dute Cup), placing clear first with 6½/10 (+3−0=7).

In May, Giri participated in the Moscow FIDE Grand Prix tournament, which is part of the qualification cycle for the 2020 World Chess Championship. The tournament was a 16-player event, and he was eliminated from the tournament after an upset loss to the lowest ranked player, GM Daniil Dubov in the first round.

In December 2019, Giri qualified for the Candidates Tournament 2020 as a player with the highest FIDE rating for the 12 months period (January–December 2019). In the rating list, Giri led Vachier-Lagrave by an average of 6 points.

=== 2020–2022 ===
Giri played in the Candidates Tournament 2020 which was suspended at the halfway point due to the COVID-19 pandemic. At the time he was on shared third place, with 3½/7, one point behind the two leaders. His second during the event was Erwin l'Ami. With two rounds to go, Anish had great chances to win the Candidates with 7.5/12. At the continuation of the Candidates Tournament in April 2021, he finished shared on third place with 7½/14, together with Fabiano Caruana.

From 12 to 14 June 2020, Giri participated in the MrDodgy Invitational. He managed to win first place in this event, beating GM David Navara 7–2 in the finals.

At the 83rd Tata Steel Masters held in January, Giri shared first place with Jorden van Foreest on a score of 8½/13 (+4-0=9). The tie-break involved two blitz games, followed by an armageddon game if scores were level after blitz. They drew both blitz tie-breaks and Giri lost the armageddon game when he ran out of time, despite van Foreest blundering a pawn and then a bishop in the frantic time scramble. Giri finished as the runner-up of the tournament.

Giri won the 2021 Magnus Carlsen Invitational, a non-FIDE-rated online tournament, after defeating Ian Nepomniachtchi in the finals in tie-breaks.

From 12 to 16 May 2021, Giri participated in the second edition of the MrDodgy Invitational, a blitz tournament. The top-seeded Giri defeated Baadur Jobava in the finals to clinch first place for the second time in a row.

At the Chess World Cup 2021, the 4th seeded Giri was defeated in an upset by 68th seed Nodirbek Abdusattorov.

In September 2021, Anish Giri won the Tolstoy Cup tournament organized by the State Leo Tolstoy Museum-Estate 'Yasnaya Polyana' and the Chess Federation of Russia.

Through February and March 2022, Giri played in the FIDE Grand Prix 2022. In the second leg, he won his pool with a 4/6 result but lost to Dmitry Andreikin 2½–1½ in the semifinals. In the third leg, he finished last in Pool D with a result of 2½/6, finishing 11th in the standings with seven points.

=== 2023 ===
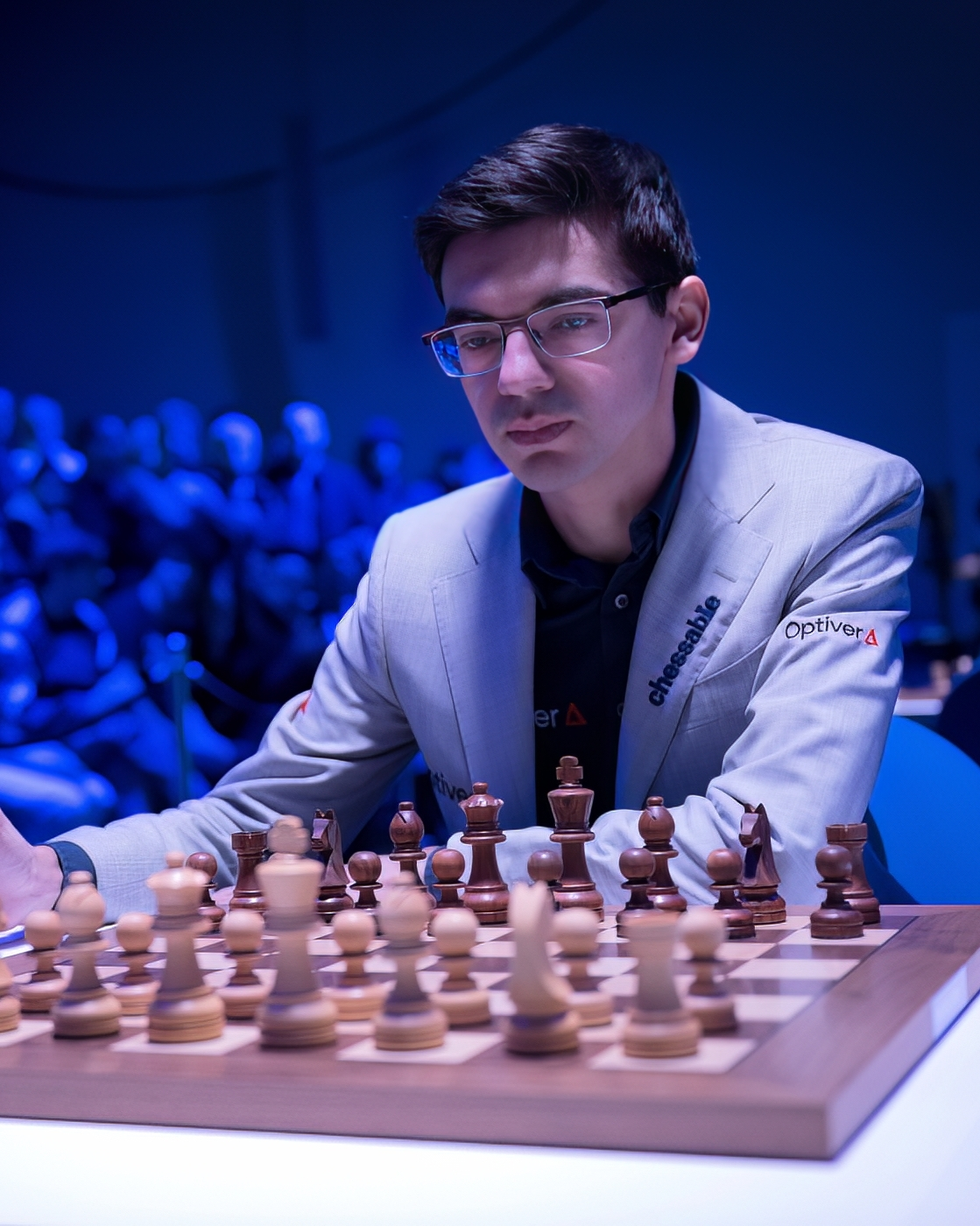
Giri at the 2023 Tata Steel Chess Tournament in Wijk aan Zee

At the Tata Steel Chess Tournament 2023, Giri beat World Chess Champion Magnus Carlsen in classical chess for the first time in 12 years. Giri also defeated Ding Liren, who would eventually win the World Championship later that year, and finished the tournament by defeating the Hungarian Grandmaster Richárd Rapport in the last round. His victory against Ding contributed to Ding's rating dropping below 2800, which left only Magnus Carlsen with a rating above 2800. Giri went on to win the event. Giri once again defeated Ding during the Superbet Chess Classic Romania leg of the Grand Chess Tour 2023, their first game since Ding's victory in the World Chess Championship 2023.

At the 2023 Dutch championship, Giri claimed his 5th championship title by defeating Jorden van Foreest in rapid tiebreaks following draws in the classical portion of the match.

At the Chess World Cup 2023, the 5th seeded Giri was upset by the 69th seeded Nijat Abasov in the third round in tiebreaks. He had defeated Arseniy Nesterov in the second round in tiebreaks, and he had a tie in the first round.

=== 2024 ===
Anish Giri finished joint first place in the Tata Steel tournament with 8.5 points from 13 games (5 wins, 7 draws, 1 loss) but lost to the eventual runner-up Gukesh D in the tiebreaker semifinals.

Giri then took part in the returning Shenzhen Masters, which he had won in 2019, but finished 7th out of 8 players with 2.5/7, losing 3 games and winning one against GM Vladislav Artemiev in round 1, thus losing 17 rating points and dropping out of the Top 10.

=== 2025 ===
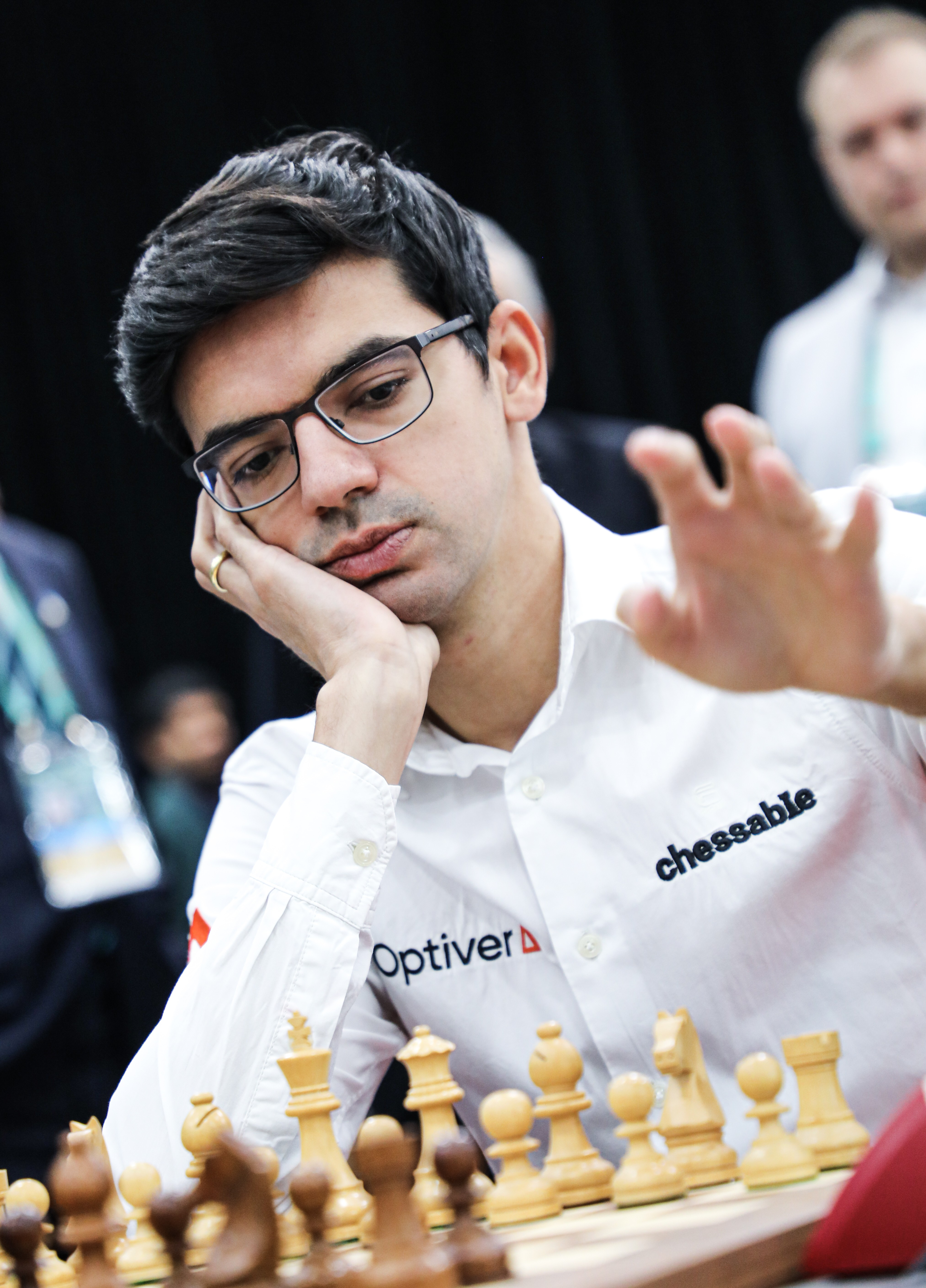
Giri at the 2025 FIDE Grand Swiss

Anish Giri finished at joint 5th place in the Tata Steel Chess Tournament 2025, scoring 7 points from 13 games (2 wins, 1 loss and 10 draws). He finished 2nd in Prague International Chess Festival 2025.

In April, Giri was announced as the first chess player to be signed by European esports organization Team Secret. As part of the deal, Giri will represent the organization during the Champions Chess Tour 2025.

In May, Giri won clear first place in the Sharjah Masters tournament with a score of 7/9.

In September, Giri won outright first place in the Grand Swiss Tournament in Samarkand, Uzbekistan with a score of 8 out of 11 points, qualifying for the FIDE Candidates Tournament 2026.

=== 2026 ===
In March–April Anish participated in the Candidates Tournament 2026, He lost his 1st-round game to Praggnanandhaa R but bounced back with a win against Esipenko in round 4, he then won his round 8 game to Praggnanandhaa to find himself on +1 tied with Caruana for 2nd place and trailing Sindarov on a +5, Anish then won his direct encounter with Fabiano in round 9, he drew his next five games and won the round 14 game to Blübaum, Anish finished the Tournament on 2nd place with the score 8.5/14, only behind 1st place Sindarov at 10/14.

In May, Giri placed 5th= in the GCT Super Chess Classic Romania with 4.5/9 (+1-1=7).

In June, Giri played for Hexamind Chess Team on board 3 in the FIDE World Team Rapid Chess Championship, scoring 5.5/11 (+1-1=9). Hexamind Chess Team placed 3rd. Giri also played on board 3 in the FIDE World Team Blitz Chess Championship. Hexamind Chess Team placed 4th.

In June–July, Giri placed 7th in the GCT Rapid and Blitz Croatia with 4/9 (+1-2=6).

In July, Giri was defeated by Hans Niemann 9.5-3.5 in an online blitz match on Endgame.ai (+1-7=5).

In August, Giri placed 8th in the GCT Saint Louis Rapid & Blitz, scoring 15.5/27. Giri placed 9th in the Sinquefield Cup, scoring 4/9 (+1-2=6).

In September, Giri played on board 1 for the Netherlands in the 46th FIDE Chess Olympiad, scoring 7.5/11 (+6-2=3). The team placed 16th.

In November, Giri participated in the Total Chess World Championship 2026. He scored 5/9 (+2-1=6) in the Blitz Swiss, which served as a tiebreaker for the group stage. Giri won Group C with 15 points and qualified to the top knockout bracket. He defeated Maxime Vachier-Lagrave in their match and went on to face Alireza Firouzja in the final. Their match went down to the armageddon where a draw was agreed in a lost position for Giri with the white pieces. As Firouzja had successfully avoided a loss with black he won the tournament, with Giri placing second.

== Team chess ==
=== Chess Olympiads ===
Giri has represented the Netherlands at eight Chess Olympiads earning three individual bronze medals and scoring a total of 57½ points from 82 games (+38-5=39).

Olympiad	Board	Individual result	Team result
Khanty-Mansiysk 2010	Fourth	8/11 (Bronze)	15th
Istanbul 2012	First	4/7	6th
Tromsø 2014	First	8/11 (Bronze)	12th
Baku 2016	First	7/11	36th
Batumi 2018	First	8½/11 (Bronze)	40th
Chennai 2022	First	6½/9	11th
Budapest 2024	First	8/11	21st
Samarkand 2026	First	7½/11	16th

=== Other team results ===
Giri has also competed in a World Team Championship, two European Team Championships and a World Cities Championship, earning a team gold medal in the World Cities Championship:

Event	Board	Individual result	Team result
2011 European Team Championship	Fourth	5/9 (7th)	6th
2012 World Cities Championship	First	5/7	Gold
2013 European Team Championship	First	6½/9 (7th)	11th
2013 World Team Championship	First	5/9 (5th)	6th

Giri has played for numerous clubs in team tournaments including SK Turm Emsdetten since 2008 in the Chess Bundesliga, HSG (Hilversum Chess Society), the Delftsche SchaakClub (Delft Chess Club), HMC Calder and En Passant. He used to play in Spanish league for chess club Sestao Naturgas Energia. He used to play in the French league (TOP-16) for l'Echiquier Châlonnais and Russian league for SHSM-64 (Moscow). He has participated and won the prestigious European Club Cup with Azeri SOCAR and Russian Siberia.

== Playing style ==
Giri's playstyle has been described as "solid and conservative" in chess terms. This makes him very difficult to defeat, but also leads to him often losing the chance to convert an advantage into a victory. Nonetheless, his peers acknowledge his strengths as a player, with Grandmaster Arkadij Naiditsch opining that beating Magnus Carlsen is easier than beating Giri.

== Notable games ==
Giri vs Magnus Carlsen, Tata Steel (2011). Neo-Grünfeld defense: Exchange Variation. Giri wins in 22 moves after Carlsen blundered a piece. Giri was quoted later as saying "Carlsen will probably not lose like this again in the next ten years".

Giri vs Ding Liren, Candidates, Yekaterinburg, Russia (2021). Ruy Lopez: Giri sacrifices a bishop to win in a deferred-exchange variation Ruy Lopez. Giri moved into second place in the tournament after the win, a half-point behind Nepomniachtchi. Giri eventually finished third in the tournament.

Giri vs Magnus Carlsen, Tata Steel, Wijk aan Zee, Netherlands (2023). Queen's Indian Defense. Giri picks up his first win against Carlsen in 12 years after capitalizing on blunders Carlsen made throughout the game. Giri was tied in first place in the tournament alongside Nodirbek Abdusattorov after the win. Giri eventually edged Abdusattorov out to win the tournament.

== Personal life ==
Giri speaks Russian, English, and Dutch. When he was a child, he also spoke Nepali and Japanese.

He is married to fellow chess player and international master Sopiko Guramishvili; the couple got married on 18 July 2015. They have two sons and a daughter. In an interview during the Candidates Tournament 2020–2021, Giri stated that he no longer possessed Russian citizenship.

He annotated a number of top games for the popular chess site ChessBase, and has written several articles, including analyses of his own games for chess magazines, such as New in Chess, 64, and Schach Magazin 64. He used to be a columnist for the magazine ChessVibes Training. Giri has created four Chessable courses, featuring the Sicilian Najdorf, Sicilian Dragon, French Defence and Grünfeld Defence openings, which has led to some banter among other GMs.

In 2014, Giri published his first book, My Junior Years In 20 Games. He also has a YouTube channel, which has about 229,000+ subscribers as of April 2026.
