= Candidates Tournament 2026 =

Chess tournament in Pegeia, Cyprus

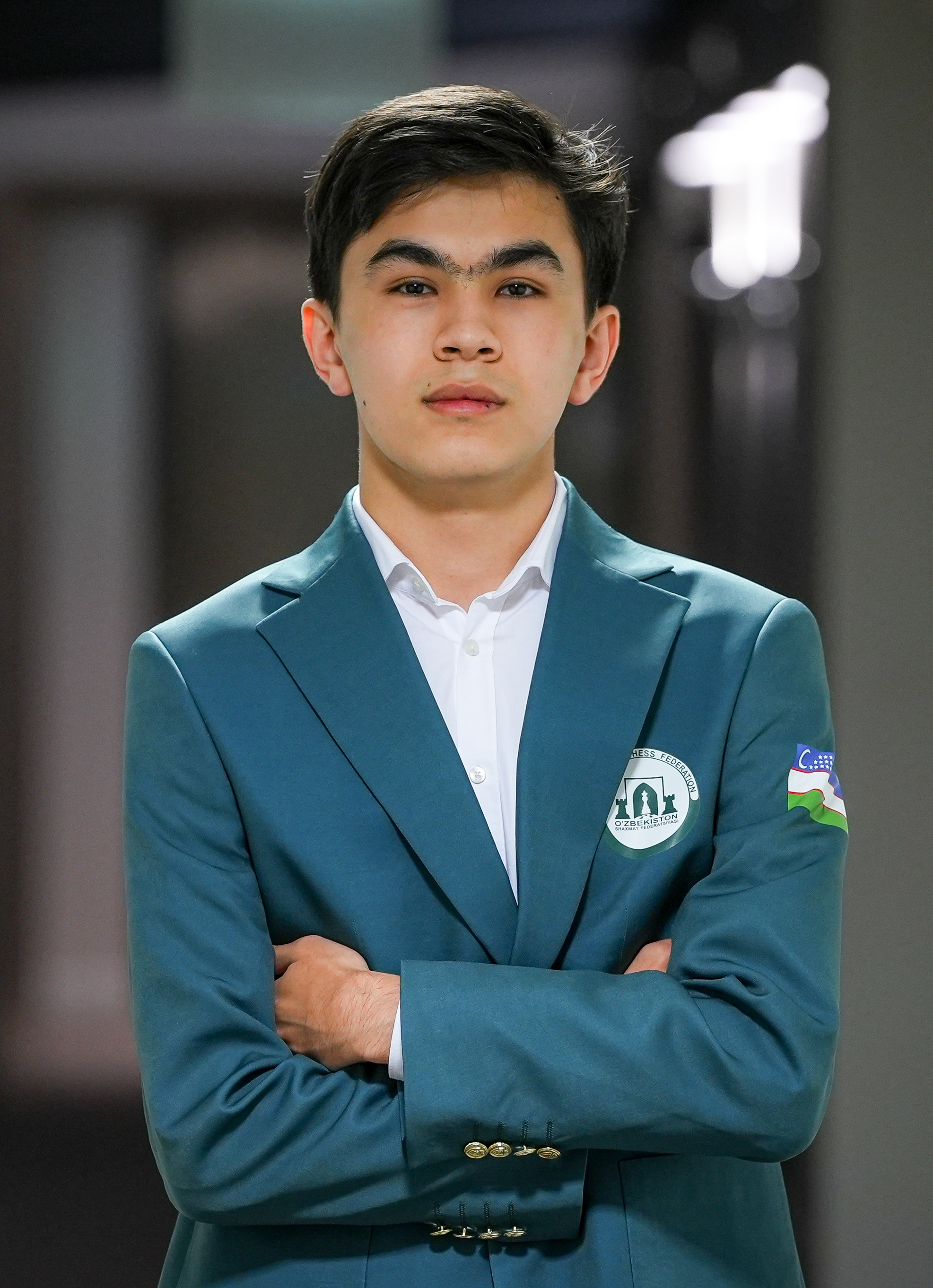
- Javokhir Sindarov, the winner of the tournament, advanced to the World Chess Championship 2026 match.
- Venue: Cap St Georges Hotel and Resort
- Location: Pegeia, Cyprus
- Dates: 28 March – 16 April 2026
- Competitors: 8
- Winning score: 10 points of 14

Champion
- (Uzbekistan) Javokhir Sindarov

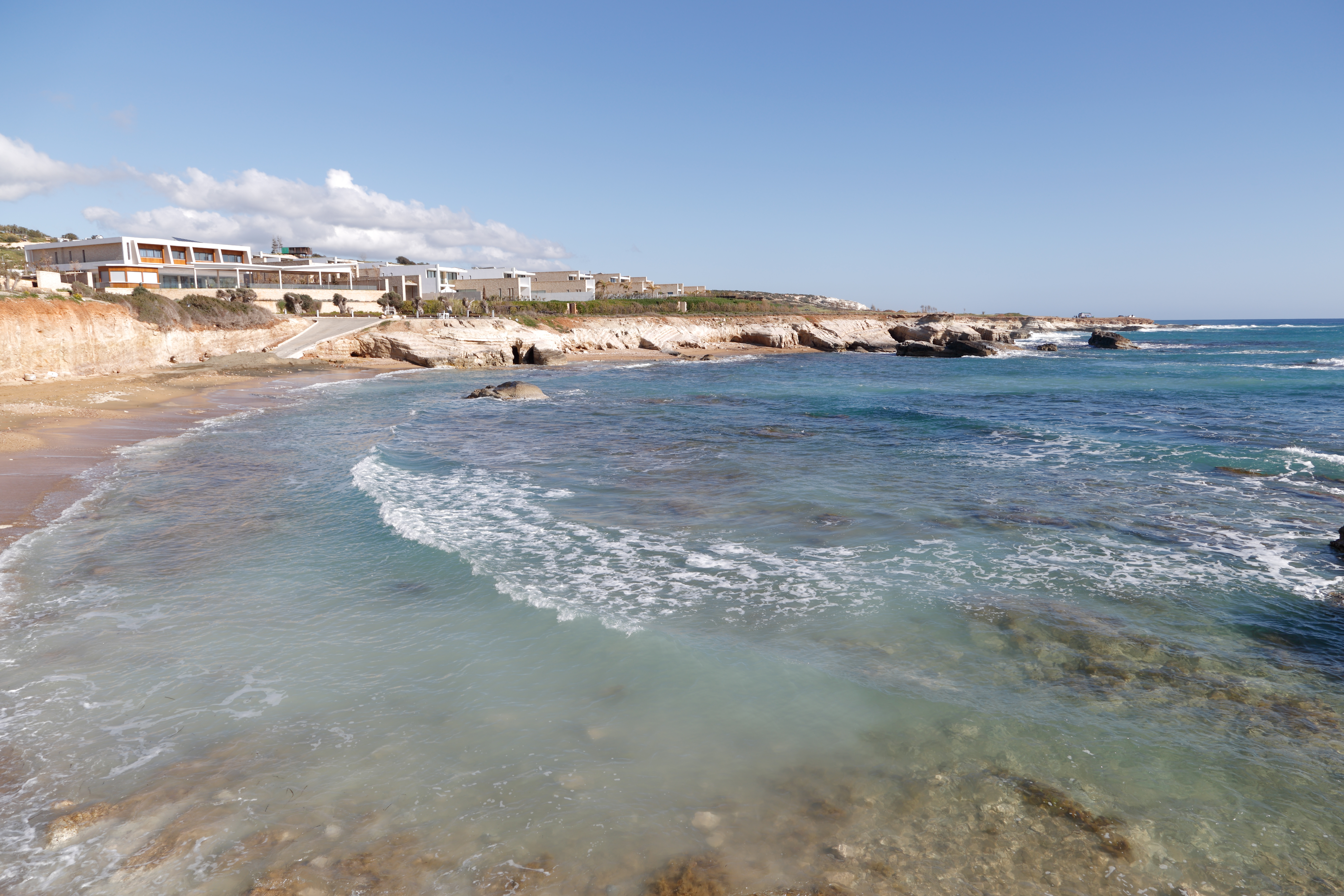
View of part of the Cap St. Georges Hotel and Resort where the tournament took place

The 2026 Candidates Tournament was an eight-player chess tournament, held to determine the challenger for the World Chess Championship 2026. The tournament took place at the Cap St Georges Hotel and Resort in Pegeia, Cyprus, between 28 March and 16 April 2026, alongside the Women's Candidates Tournament 2026. As with every Candidates Tournament since 2013, it was a double round-robin tournament.

Javokhir Sindarov won five of the first six rounds, winning the tournament with a round to spare and setting a points record for the Candidates in the process. He thus earned the right to play in the World Chess Championship 2026 against the reigning World Chess Champion Gukesh Dommaraju.

== Qualification ==
The eight players to qualify to the Candidates Tournament were:

Qualification method	Player	Age	Rating	World ranking
Qualification method	Player	(March 2026)		
2024 FIDE Circuit winner	(United States) Fabiano Caruana	33	2795	3
Top two finishers of the 2025 FIDE Grand Swiss	(Netherlands) Anish Giri (winner)	31	2753	8
Top two finishers of the 2025 FIDE Grand Swiss	(Germany) Matthias Blübaum (runner-up)	28	2698	32
Top three finishers of the 2025 FIDE World Cup	(Uzbekistan) Javokhir Sindarov (winner)	20	2745	12
Top three finishers of the 2025 FIDE World Cup	(China) Wei Yi (runner-up)	26	2754	7
Top three finishers of the 2025 FIDE World Cup	(FIDE) Andrey Esipenko (Note: Esipenko is Russian. However, he plays under the FIDE flag because FIDE banned the display of Russian and Belarusian flags on 27 February 2022 in response to the Russian invasion of Ukraine.) (third place)	24	2698	33
2025 FIDE Circuit winner	(India) R Praggnanandhaa	20	2741	13
Highest average rating (Note: Provided the player has played at least 40 games rated for the February 2025 through January 2026 standard rating lists, including at least 15 in any of the six consecutive lists from August 2025 to January 2026.) (Aug 2025 – Jan 2026)	(United States) Hikaru Nakamura	38	2810	2

Unlike any other Candidates Tournaments, and any FIDE World Championship cycle (except 1999–2004 during the split-title period), there was no automatic spot for the runner-up of the previous Championship (Ding Liren). To compensate, the 2024 championship had been considered an eligible tournament for the FIDE Circuit, with the runner-up obtaining special bonus points for the 2025 FIDE Circuit based on the score.

=== FIDE rating qualifier ===
Despite reforms to the rating qualifier ahead of the 2024 Candidates Tournament, controversy arose over the allocation of a spot to the Candidates by rating. As stated in the regulations, a non-qualified player is able to qualify "provided the player has played at least 40 games rated for the February 2025 through January 2026 standard rating lists, including at least 15 in any of the six consecutive lists from August 2025 to January 2026." Hikaru Nakamura, who ultimately secured the spot to the Candidates, opted to play in local U.S. and Canada tournaments: Louisiana State Championship, Iowa Open, Maritime Open, and Dulles Open. In these four events he played 22 games meeting the regulations criteria (plus one game not applying) in order to reach the 40-game threshold, having played 18 games beforehand. He scored 20 wins and 2 draws against an opposition with an average Elo rating of 2090. (Note: Opponents' ratings in chronological order, as per the FIDE site: 1812, 1919, 2043, 1900, 2250, 2138 (Louisiana); 1915, 1919, 1950, 2147, 2100 (Iowa); 1917, 1808, 2366, 2353, 2311, 2101 (Maritime Open); 1788, 2025, 2310, 2400, 2505 (Dulles).)

This garnered criticism from some grandmasters, notably Hans Niemann and Jacob Aagaard. However, Magnus Carlsen (who did not meet the 40-game requirement and had publicly stated his lack of interest in qualifying for the Candidates) and Susan Polgar defended Nakamura, with the latter highlighting the openness that Nakamura showed by "discussing it publicly in advance and streaming his games". In response to the criticism, Nakamura noted earlier that "he is in the later stage of his playing life and wants to ensure he makes the most of his remaining chances to compete in Candidates cycles."

Starting on 1 October 2025, FIDE announced partial changes to the rating system in response to Nakamura's rating gain from playing lower-level opponents. For players rated above 2650, winning against opponents with a 400-point difference no longer gained 0.8 Elo points, instead only gaining 0.1 Elo points for a win and no rating gain when playing opponents with a difference of 735 points. Grandmaster David Howell called the reform "short-sighted and flawed", saying that FIDE could simply have required "a minimum average of opponents' ratings" for qualification to the Candidates, and arguing the change "will least impact the top players" and "negatively affect those who are dependent on open tournaments to make a living". The updated rules did not change Nakamura's approach, who continued to play in small tournaments to reach the 40-game threshold. He achieved this after winning the 1st Annual Washington Dulles Open on tiebreak in early November, guaranteeing that he would get the rating spot.

The following table shows the ratings of the players with the top average ratings from August 2025 to January 2026.

Ranking	Player	Aug 2025	Sep 2025	Oct 2025	Nov 2025	Dec 2025	Jan 2026	Average rating	Qualification status for Candidates Tournament	Total games played
1	(Norway) Magnus Carlsen	2839	2839	2839	2839	2840	2840	2839.333	Did not qualify (too few games for highest-rating criterion)	16
2	(United States) Hikaru Nakamura	2807	2807	2816	2813	2810	2810	2810.500	Qualified via highest-rating criterion	40
3	(United States) Fabiano Caruana	2784	2789	2789	2795	2795	2795	2791.667	Qualified via non-rating criteria	40+
4	(India) Arjun Erigaisi	2776	2771	2773	2769	2775	2775	2773.167	Did not qualify	40+
5	(India) R Praggnanandhaa	2778	2785	2771	2768	2761	2758	2770.167	Qualified via non-rating criteria	40+
6	(India) Gukesh Dommaraju	2776	2767	2752	2763	2754	2754	2761.000	Ineligible as reigning World Champion	40+

== Organization ==
The tournament was an eight-player, double round-robin tournament, meaning there were 14 rounds with each player facing the others twice: once with the black pieces and once with the white pieces. The tournament winner would qualify to play Gukesh Dommaraju for the World Championship in 2026.

=== Regulations ===
The time control was 120 minutes for the first 40 moves, then 30 minutes for the rest of the game, plus a 30-second increment per move starting from move 41. Players got 1 point for a win, ½ point for a draw and 0 points for a loss. The pairings and colours for each round would be decided via a draw, which would be conducted not later than four weeks before the tournament.

Tiebreaks for the first place would have been addressed as follows:

- If two players were tied, they would play two rapid chess games at 15 minutes plus 10 seconds per move. If a three- to six-way tie occurred, a single round-robin would be played. If seven or eight players are tied, a single round-robin would be played with a time limit of 10 minutes plus 5 seconds per move.
- If any players were tied for first after the rapid chess games, they would play two blitz chess games at 3 minutes plus 2 seconds per move. In the case of more than two players being tied, a single round-robin would be played.
- If any players were still tied for first after these blitz chess games, the remaining players would play a knock-out blitz tournament at the same time control. In each mini-match of the proposed knock-out tournament, the first player to win a game would win the mini-match.

Ties for places other than first were broken by, in order: (1) Sonneborn–Berger score; (2) total number of wins; (3) head-to-head score among tied players; (4) drawing of lots.

=== Prize money ===
The prize money was €70,000 for first place, €45,000 for second place, and €25,000 for third place (with players on the same number of points sharing prize money, irrespective of tie-breaks), plus €5,000 per half-point for every player, for a minimum total prize pool of €700,000, according to the regulations.

=== Arbiters ===
The Chief Arbiter for the event was Takis Nikolopoulos (Greece) with Andrew Howie (Scotland) and Ana Srebrnič (Slovenia) both acting as Deputy Chief Arbiter and Fair Play Officer.

=== Schedule ===
On 10 November 2025, FIDE announced the following schedule. Matches began daily at 15:30 EEST (UTC +3).

Date	Day	Event
28 March	Saturday	Opening Ceremony
28 March	Saturday	Media Day
28 March	Saturday	Technical Meeting
29 March	Sunday	Round 1
30 March	Monday	Round 2
31 March	Tuesday	Round 3
1 April	Wednesday	Round 4
2 April	Thursday	Rest Day
3 April	Friday	Round 5
4 April	Saturday	Round 6
5 April	Sunday	Round 7
6 April	Monday	Rest Day
7 April	Tuesday	Round 8
8 April	Wednesday	Round 9
9 April	Thursday	Round 10
10 April	Friday	Rest Day
11 April	Saturday	Round 11
12 April	Sunday	Round 12
13 April	Monday	Rest Day
14 April	Tuesday	Round 13
15 April	Wednesday	Round 14
16 April	Thursday	Tie-breakers (if required)
16 April	Thursday	Closing Ceremony

== Results ==
=== Standings ===
Standings of the 2026 Candidates Tournament
Rank	Player	Score	SB	Wins	Qualification	JS		AG		FC		WY		HN		MB		RP		AE	
1	Javokhir Sindarov (UZB)	10 / 14	64.75	6	Advanced to title match			½	½	1	½	½	1	½	1	½	½	1	1	1	½
2	Anish Giri (NED)	8.5 / 14	56.5	4		½	½			½	1	½	½	½	½	½	1	1	0	½	1
3	Fabiano Caruana (USA)	7.5 / 14	48	4		½	0	0	½			1	½	1	0	1	½	½	½	½	1
4	Wei Yi (CHN)	7 / 14	44.75	2		0	½	½	½	½	0			½	½	½	½	½	½	1	1
5	Hikaru Nakamura (USA)	6.5 / 14	44.5	1		0	½	½	½	1	0	½	½			½	½	½	½	½	½
6	Matthias Blübaum (GER)	6 / 14	42	0		½	½	0	½	½	0	½	½	½	½			½	½	½	½
7	R Praggnanandhaa (IND)	6 / 14	40	1		0	0	1	0	½	½	½	½	½	½	½	½			½	½
8	Andrey Esipenko (FIDE)	4.5 / 14	31.5	0		½	0	0	½	0	½	0	0	½	½	½	½	½	½		

Source: FIDE
Rules for classification: For first place: tie-break games. For subsequent spots: (1) results in tie-break games for first place, if any; (2) Sonneborn–Berger score (SB); (3) total number of wins; (4) head-to-head score among tied players; (5) drawing of lots.
Note: Numbers in the crosstable in a white background indicate the result playing the respective opponent with the white pieces (black pieces if on a black background). This does not give information which of the two games was played in the first half of the tournament, and which in the second.

=== Points by round ===
This table shows the total number of wins minus the total number of losses each player had after each round. The symbol '=' indicates the player had won and lost the same number of games after that round. Green backgrounds indicate the player(s) with the highest score after each round. Red backgrounds indicate players who could no longer win the tournament after each round.

Rank	Player	Rounds													
Rank	Player	1	2	3	4	5	6	7	8	9	10	11	12	13	14
1	Javokhir Sindarov (UZB)	+1	+1	+2	+3	+4	+5	+5	+5	+5	+6	+6	+6	+6	+6
2	Anish Giri (NED)	−1	−1	−1	=	=	=	=	+1	+2	+2	+2	+2	+2	+3
3	Fabiano Caruana (USA)	+1	+1	+2	+1	+2	+2	+2	+1	=	=	=	=	=	+1
4	Wei Yi (CHN)	=	=	−1	−1	−1	−2	−1	−1	−1	−1	−1	−1	=	=
5	Hikaru Nakamura (USA)	−1	−1	−1	−1	−2	−2	−2	−1	−1	−1	−1	−1	−1	−1
6	Matthias Blübaum (GER)	=	=	=	=	−1	−1	−1	−1	−1	−1	−1	−1	−1	−2
7	R Praggnanandhaa (IND)	+1	+1	=	=	=	=	=	−1	−1	−2	−2	−2	−2	−2
8	Andrey Esipenko (FIDE)	−1	−1	−1	−2	−2	−2	−3	−3	−3	−3	−3	−3	−4	−5

=== Summary ===
Caruana–Nakamura, round 1

Position: d7 black king, b6 black pawn, e6 white pawn, f6 black pawn, h6 black pawn, a5 black pawn, d5 white king, h5 white pawn, a4 white pawn, c4 white pawn, d4 black pawn, g4 white pawn, h4 black bishop, d3 white bishop

80...Kc7! would've saved a draw; example continuation: 81. Bf5 d3! 82. Bxd3 Kd8 83. Kc6 Bf2. Instead, Nakamura quickly played 80...Ke7??, losing the b6-pawn after 81. Kc6, and resigned two moves later.

Caruana, Sindarov and Praggnanandhaa all won in round 1. Caruana outplayed Nakamura after the latter drifted in a deceptively complicated midgame. Caruana's conversion was not flawless, but Nakamura missed a crucial saving resource (80...Kc7!) and had to resign. Sindarov got a poor position against Esipenko, but Esipenko miscalculated a crucial line and wound up losing instead. Praggnanandhaa played the Grand Prix Attack against Giri, a rare line at top level, but one that surprised Giri. Praggnanandhaa achieved an opening advantage and converted flawlessly.

In round 2, all four games were drawn. Sindarov chose a line against the Petrov that resulted in an early queen exchange and managed to create a space advantage in the resulting queenless middlegame. However he allowed the exchange of Blübaum's restricted knight and thereafter the game petered out. Likewise Esipenko was unable to turn his own small edge in the middlegame into anything more tangible after active defence by Nakamura.

Caruana–Wei Yi, round 3

Position: c8 black rook, d8 black queen, f8 black rook, g8 black king, a7 black pawn, d7 black knight, e7 black pawn, f7 black pawn, g7 black bishop, g6 black pawn, h6 black pawn, b5 white queen, g4 white pawn, c3 white knight, f3 white knight, h3 black bishop, a2 white pawn, b2 white pawn, d2 white pawn, e2 white pawn, f2 white pawn, h2 white pawn, a1 white rook, c1 white bishop, e1 white king, g1 white rook

In this position, Black has full compensation for two pawns because of his lead in development. Wei Yi's 16...Rc5? though was a step in the wrong direction, and after 17. Qb3 Ne5?? 18. Nxe5 Rxe5 19. Nd1 picking up the h3-bishop, Wei Yi resigned. Wei Yi had calculated 19. Rg3 Qa8 threatening ...Qh1+, with counterplay.

The third round saw Caruana and Sindarov both win again. Wei Yi sprang the first surprise against Caruana in the opening, sacrificing two pawns as black in an English Opening. However, he allowed his light-squared bishop to be entombed on h3. The position was still equal, but it was black who was required to show greater precision. The combination of 16...Rc5? and 17...Ne5? allowed Caruana to simply win the bishop on h3 for no compensation. Wei Yi resigned after just 19 moves. With 13...Nxb4!? Sindarov sacrificed a piece for two pawns and a lasting initiative against Praggnanandhaa's king in the centre. While the position remained complex and objectively balanced, it was easier to play for black and eventually Praggnanandhaa blundered in mutual time pressure. Therefore, Sindarov and Caruana held an advantage of a point over the rest of the field after three rounds.

In round 4, the two co-leaders faced off. Sindarov defeated Caruana after outpreparing him in the Queen's Gambit Accepted and establishing a time advantage of over an hour. 18.Bc4! pinpointed the problem of the black king still in the centre, while preventing Qd5 to exploit white's own king's weakness on the long diagonal. Sindarov's 3.5/4 is the fastest-ever start in this Candidates format. Elsewhere, Giri defeated Esipenko in a complicated Najdorf after finding 18...Ba4!, a key resource that gave him enough time to secure his king and make use of his extra pawn and two bishops. Giri thus moved back to an even score for the tournament. Nakamura had a chance to join him but ultimately miscalculated while a pawn up in a double rook endgame against Wei Yi and the game was drawn.

Nakamura–Sindarov, round 5

Position: a8 black rook, c8 black bishop, f8 black rook, g8 black king, a7 black pawn, b7 black pawn, e7 black knight, f7 black pawn, g7 black pawn, h7 black pawn, a6 black knight, c6 black pawn, d6 white bishop, e6 black pawn, g5 black queen, c4 white pawn, f3 white bishop, g3 white knight, a2 white pawn, b2 white pawn, f2 white pawn, h2 white pawn, a1 white rook, d1 white queen, e1 white king, h1 white rook

In this position, on his 13th move, Nakamura thought for 67 minutes and 44 seconds; he remarked afterward on his stream that Black's 12...0-0 was not in the opening file prepared by his second. He ultimately played the wrong move.

In round 5, Sindarov won his third game in a row after out-preparing Nakamura in the Marshall Gambit. Nakamura missed Sindarov's 12...0-0 in his preparation, and after a 67-minute think played 13.h4?, allowing Sindarov to take the initiative and ultimately win the game. Nakamura later claimed that his team failed to include the castling line into his preparation notes. After his loss against Sindarov in round 4, Caruana bounced back against Blübaum with a rare idea in the Petrov, in which he was able to outplay Blübaum. This win kept Caruana within 1 point of Sindarov, and 1 point ahead of Giri and Praggnanandhaa in a distant joint third place.

In round 6, Sindarov extended his lead over Caruana to 1.5 points, after defeating Wei Yi with the black pieces. Grandmaster Vidit Gujrathi highlighted Sindarov's use of 15...Bg4 instead of seeking equality by playing the pragmatic 15...Ra3, which he remarked that would lead to long term compensation and that he is "very good at it". Praggnanandhaa and Nakamura notably drew in their game, with the former employing the Nimzo-Indian Defence to open the game, but with both players trading knights and bishops, the position remained equal throughout the game.

Esipenko–Wei Yi, round 7

Position: c8 black rook, g8 black king, a7 black pawn, e7 black knight, g7 black pawn, h7 black pawn, a6 black queen, d6 black bishop, f6 black pawn, b5 black bishop, d5 black pawn, b4 black pawn, c4 black rook, d4 white pawn, g4 white pawn, h4 white pawn, b3 white pawn, d3 white bishop, f3 white pawn, a2 white pawn, d2 white bishop, e2 white knight, f2 white queen, a1 white rook, b1 white king, h1 white rook

Position after 26...Bb5!! Black threatens Rc1+ and Bxd3+, so White has to accept the sacrifice, but after 27. bxc4 Bxc4 28. Bc2 (28. Bxc4 Qxc4 is also decisive) Bd3, Black wins anyway.

Heading into the rest day, Sindarov's 4 game win-streak was stopped with a draw by Anish Giri in round 7. Sindarov once again achieved an opening edge and an advantageous position, but this time Giri successfully held an exchange-down fortress. Even so, Sindarov already had as many wins as the previous four winners of the Candidates by the halfway point (Gukesh in 2024, Nepomniachtchi in both 2022 and 2020/21, and Caruana in 2018 ended their Candidates tournaments with 4 wins each). Wei Yi achieved the only decisive result in the round after defeating Andrey Esipenko with the black pieces. After Esipenko played the worse 14.Bd2?! instead of 14.0-0-0, Wei put together a queenside attack that culminated in 26...Bb5!!, sacrificing his rook to maintain his initiative.

Two decisive results took place in round 8, with Nakamura and Giri picking up wins against Caruana and Praggnanandhaa respectively. Nakamura opted for the English Opening, and in a double-rook endgame Caruana played 28...h5? instead of 28...Rab2. With Caruana unable to prevent white from doubling rooks on the seventh rank (by following up with 29...Rb7 to defend against this), Nakamura converted his advantage to pick up his first win of the event. With Giri having an advantage by move 25, Praggnanandhaa later played 35...Qf7? with 7 minutes on the clock instead of the solid 35...Bb5 (the continuation 36.Re3 Ba4 37.e6 Bc2 would have allowed the bishop to be positioned on e4 and maintain a draw). Giri wrapped up the game in 46 moves after pushing a passed pawn to join Caruana in second place.

Caruana–Giri, round 9

Position: g7 black pawn, h7 black king, b6 black queen, d6 black pawn, f6 black pawn, g6 black bishop, h6 black pawn, c5 black pawn, d5 white pawn, e5 black pawn, b4 black pawn, c4 white pawn, e4 white pawn, b3 white pawn, d3 white queen, e3 white pawn, g3 white king, h3 white pawn, g2 white pawn, a1 white knight

Position after 38.Kg3? White moves his king instead of capturing the c5 pawn with en passant.

Giri continued his strong momentum to solely clinch second place in round 9, after defeating Caruana with the black pieces. Under time pressure, Caruana chose to play 38.Kg3? instead of capturing the c6 pawn with en passant, which allowed Giri to play 42...f5+! and follow up with 43.exf5 Kh6!!. With checkmate looming, Caruana resigned and was handed his second consecutive loss of the tournmanent. Notably, tournament leader Sindarov and Praggnanandhaa were unable to convert their advantageous positions, as the latter in his game against Wei Yi missed 42.b4! which allowed his opponent to equalize, and both settled for draws. Sindarov still led the way, 1.5 points ahead of Giri.

In round 10, Sindarov completed the double over Praggnanandhaa by defeating him again in a topical line of the Queen's Gambit Declined. Sindarov sacrificed a piece in accordance with the established theory but Praggnanandhaa was well prepared. However, again the position required absolute precision from the player with extra material and 22...Bd7?? gave Sindarov a chance to transpose into a favourable queen-versus-two-rooks endgame with black lacking counterplay due to his eternally unsafe king. Giri exerted some pressure against Nakamura but never enjoyed a concrete advantage and the game was drawn. Sindarov thus reclaimed the two-point advantage he had previously held after round 8. The tournament was effectively over, and after further draws in rounds 11 and 12, Sindarov confirmed himself as the challenger for the next World Chess Championship. His winning score of 10/14 set a new record for the Candidates, beating Ian Nepomniachtchi's 9.5/14 score in the Candidates Tournament 2022.

=== Results by round ===
In February 2026, FIDE announced pairings for the tournament.

Round 1 (29 March) (Note: First named player is white. 1–0 indicates a white win, 0–1 indicates a black win, and ½–½ indicates a draw. Numbers in parentheses show players' scores prior to the round. Penultimate column indicates opening played, abridged from chessgames.com. Ultimate column links to match replay on chessgames.com.)
Javokhir Sindarov	1–0	Andrey Esipenko	D37 Queen's Gambit Declined
Matthias Blübaum	½–½	Wei Yi	D40 Semi-Tarrasch Defense
R Praggnanandhaa	1–0	Anish Giri	B23 Closed Sicilian
Fabiano Caruana	1–0	Hikaru Nakamura	A13 English Agincourt Defense
Round 2 (30 March)
Andrey Esipenko (0)	½–½	Hikaru Nakamura (0)	A13 English Agincourt Defense
Anish Giri (0)	½–½	Fabiano Caruana (1)	D30 Queen's Gambit Declined
Wei Yi (½)	½–½	R Praggnanandhaa (1)	C11 French Steinitz
Javokhir Sindarov (1)	½–½	Matthias Blübaum (½)	C42 Petrov Classical
Round 3 (31 March)
Matthias Blübaum (1)	½–½	Andrey Esipenko (½)	D37 Queen's Gambit Declined
R Praggnanandhaa (1½)	0–1	Javokhir Sindarov (1½)	D37 Queen's Gambit Declined
Fabiano Caruana (1½)	1–0	Wei Yi (1)	A15 Anglo-Indian Defense
Hikaru Nakamura (½)	½–½	Anish Giri (½)	A28 English Four Knights
Round 4 (1 April)
Andrey Esipenko (1)	0–1	Anish Giri (1)	B95 Sicilian Najdorf
Wei Yi (1)	½–½	Hikaru Nakamura (1)	B50 Sicilian Defence
Javokhir Sindarov (2½)	1–0	Fabiano Caruana (2½)	D26 Queen's Gambit Accepted
Matthias Blübaum (1½)	½–½	R Praggnanandhaa (1½)	D45 Semi-Slav Defense
Round 5 (3 April)
R Praggnanandhaa (2)	½–½	Andrey Esipenko (1)	A13 English Opening
Fabiano Caruana (2½)	1–0	Matthias Blübaum (2)	C42 Petrov Classical
Hikaru Nakamura (1½)	0–1	Javokhir Sindarov (3½)	D31 Queen's Gambit Declined
Anish Giri (2)	½–½	Wei Yi (1½)	A14 English Neo-Catalan
Round 6 (4 April)
Fabiano Caruana (3½)	½–½	Andrey Esipenko (1½)	A14 English Neo-Catalan
Hikaru Nakamura (1½)	½–½	R Praggnanandhaa (2½)	E44 Nimzo-Indian Fischer
Anish Giri (2½)	½–½	Matthias Blübaum (2)	D35 Queen's Gambit Declined
Wei Yi (2)	0–1	Javokhir Sindarov (4½)	C28 Vienna Game
Round 7 (5 April)
Andrey Esipenko (2)	0–1	Wei Yi (2)	C43 Petrov's Defence
Javokhir Sindarov (5½)	½–½	Anish Giri (3)	D38 QGD Ragozin
Matthias Blübaum (2½)	½–½	Hikaru Nakamura (2)	D37 Queen's Gambit Declined
R Praggnanandhaa (3)	½–½	Fabiano Caruana (4)	D17 Slav Defense
Round 8 (7 April)
Andrey Esipenko (2)	½–½	Javokhir Sindarov (6)	A13 English Agincourt Defense
Wei Yi (3)	½–½	Matthias Blübaum (3)	C28 Vienna Game
Anish Giri (3½)	1–0	R Praggnanandhaa (3½)	D39 QGD Vienna
Hikaru Nakamura (2½)	1–0	Fabiano Caruana (4½)	A33 Symmetrical English
Round 9 (8 April)
Fabiano Caruana (4½)	0–1	Anish Giri (4½)	C42 Petrov Classical
Matthias Blübaum (3½)	½–½	Javokhir Sindarov (6½)	D37 Queen's Gambit Declined
R Praggnanandhaa (3½)	½–½	Wei Yi (3½)	D40 QGD Semi-Tarrasch
Hikaru Nakamura (3½)	½–½	Andrey Esipenko (2½)	D55 Queen's Gambit Declined
Round 10 (9 April)
Andrey Esipenko (3)	½–½	Matthias Blübaum (4)	C42 Petrov Classical
Javokhir Sindarov (7)	1–0	R Praggnanandhaa (4)	D37 Queen's Gambit Declined
Wei Yi (4)	½–½	Fabiano Caruana (4½)	C15 French Winawer
Anish Giri (5½)	½–½	Hikaru Nakamura (4)	D31 Queen's Gambit Declined
Round 11 (11 April)
Anish Giri (6)	½–½	Andrey Esipenko (3½)	D31 Queen's Gambit Declined
Hikaru Nakamura (4½)	½–½	Wei Yi (4½)	A14 English Neo-Catalan
Fabiano Caruana (5)	½–½	Javokhir Sindarov (8)	A14 English Neo-Catalan
R Praggnanandhaa (4)	½–½	Matthias Blübaum (4½)	C42 Petrov Classical
Round 12 (12 April)
Andrey Esipenko (4)	½–½	R Praggnanandhaa (4½)	A13 English Agincourt Defense
Matthias Blübaum (5)	½–½	Fabiano Caruana (5½)	D37 Queen's Gambit Declined
Javokhir Sindarov (8½)	½–½	Hikaru Nakamura (5)	D37 Queen's Gambit Declined
Wei Yi (5)	½–½	Anish Giri (6½)	C26 Vienna Game
Round 13 (14 April)
Wei Yi (5½)	1–0	Andrey Esipenko (4½)	C42 Petrov Classical
Anish Giri (7)	½–½	Javokhir Sindarov (9)	D31 Queen's Gambit Declined
Hikaru Nakamura (5½)	½–½	Matthias Blübaum (5½)	D53 Queen's Gambit Declined
Fabiano Caruana (6)	½–½	R Praggnanandhaa (5)	E21 Nimzo-Indian Kasparov
Round 14 (15 April)
Andrey Esipenko (4½)	0–1	Fabiano Caruana (6½)	B90 Sicilian Najdorf
R Praggnanandhaa (5½)	½–½	Hikaru Nakamura (6)	D37 Queen's Gambit Declined
Matthias Blübaum (6)	0–1	Anish Giri (7½)	D38 QGD Ragozin
Javokhir Sindarov (9½)	½–½	Wei Yi (6½)	C48 Four Knights

== See also ==
- Women's Candidates Tournament 2026
- World Chess Championship 2026
