= Anisha =

Anisha may refer to

- Anisha Ambrose, Indian film actress and model
- Anisha Basheel (born 1997), Malawian professional boxer
- Anisha Nagarajan (born 1983), American actress and singer
- Anisha Nicole (born 1985), American singer
- Anisha Rosnah (born 1993) Bruneian royalty
- Anisha Vekemans (born 1991), Belgian professional racing cyclist

== See also ==
- Anish, a given name
