= Amisha =

Amisha is a given name. Notable people with the name include:

- Amisha Patel (born 1975), Indian Bollywood actress
- Amisha Sethi, Indian author, philanthropist, business leader, and model

== See also ==
- Anisha
