= Anish =

The name Anish is derived from Sanskrit. It means "supreme". The name also shares references to Shiva, Krishna and Vishnu.

Notable people with the name include:

- Anish Kalsi (born 2001), Indian Astronomer
- Anish Giri (born 1994), Dutch chess player
- Anish Sood (born 1989), Indian music producer
- Anish Shroff (born 1982), American sportscaster
- Anish Tejeshwar, Indian actor and director
- Anish Kuruvilla (born 1977), Indian Actor and Director
- Anish Kapoor (born 1954), Indian sculptor

== See also ==
- Anish (river)
