= Javokhir Sindarov =

Uzbek chess grandmaster (born 2005)

- Sindarov at the 2026 Chess Olympiad

Personal information
- Born: 8 December 2005 (age 20) Tashkent, Uzbekistan
- Website: sindarov.com

Chess career
- Country: Uzbekistan
- Title: Grandmaster (2018)
- FIDE rating: 2782 (November 2026)
- Peak rating: 2782 (October 2026)
- Ranking: No. 4 (November 2026)
- Peak ranking: No. 4 (June 2026)

Javokhir Sindarov (Note: Uzbek: Javohir Sindarov, Жавоҳир Синдаров.) (born 8 December 2005) is an Uzbek chess grandmaster. A chess prodigy, he became a grandmaster in 2018 at the age of 12 years, 10 months, and 8 days—the second-youngest in history at the time. Representing Uzbekistan, he was a member of the team that won gold at the 44th Chess Olympiad and the 46th Chess Olympiad.

Sindarov won the 2025 Chess World Cup after defeating Wei Yi in the finals, becoming its youngest and first Uzbek winner and qualifying for the 2026 Candidates Tournament. He went on to win the event, earning the right to play the 2026 World Chess Championship against the reigning champion Gukesh Dommaraju.

== Early life ==
Sindarov was born in Tashkent on 8 December 2005. His father is a businessman, and his mother is a schoolteacher. His paternal grandfather, Komil Sindarov, taught him to play chess when he was four and a half years old. Komil is the vice president of the Chess Federation of Uzbekistan and the author of a number of detective novels.

Javokhir has three younger brothers, one of whom, Islombek, is also a chess player.

== Chess career ==
=== Early career ===
Sindarov showed early talent, winning city and regional tournaments by age 5–6. In 2012, he won the Asian School Chess Championship in the under-7 category. In 2014, Javokhir and Islombek both won gold medals at the World School Chess Championship in rapid and blitz, with Javokhir taking first place in the under-9 category and Islombek in the under-7. That same year, Javokhir made his debut at the World Junior Chess Championship in classical chess, finishing 9th; fellow Uzbek Nodirbek Abdusattorov finished second, marking the beginning of their long-standing rivalry.

Sindarov was awarded the title of International Master in October 2017. He achieved his first grandmaster norm at the Alekhine Memorial in June 2018. His second-place finish at the World Junior Chess Championship in September brought his rating to 2500. In October 2018, he scored his third GM norm at the First Saturday tournament to become the second-youngest grandmaster in history at the time. The title was awarded by FIDE in March 2019.

=== 2021 ===
Sindarov qualified for the Chess World Cup 2021. Ranked 121st, he caused a major upset by defeating 8th-ranked Alireza Firouzja in tiebreaks in the second round, and made it to the final 32 before being knocked out in the fourth round by Kacper Piorun.

=== 2022 ===
At the 44th Chess Olympiad in August 2022, Sindarov was part of the Uzbek team that won gold medal in the open section in Chennai.

=== 2023 ===
In the Chess World Cup 2023, Sindarov again caused a major upset, defeating the tournament's 10th seed Maxime Vachier-Lagrave in the third round, before being eliminated by Arjun Erigaisi in the fourth round.

In October 2023, Sindarov played in the Asian Games. He won bronze in the individual (rapid) event, and played on board two for Uzbekistan in the team event, scoring 6/8 while his team earned a bronze medal behind India and Iran; after that, he took fourth place in the Qatar Masters Open tournament with an undefeated 6.5/9 score.

In November, Sindarov entered the FIDE Grand Swiss Tournament and finished eighth with 7/11. He was among the leaders until round 7, when he was defeated by Vidit Gujrathi, the eventual winner, in his only loss of the tournament. Nonetheless, he managed to win four games, including one against former world number two Levon Aronian.

=== 2024 ===
After the Grand Swiss, Sindarov crossed the 2700 Elo mark for the first time in his career. In June 2024, he played in the UzChess Cup Masters and finished fifth overall, defeating higher-rated fellow Uzbek grandmaster Nodirbek Abdusattorov (2766) in their individual game.

=== 2025 ===
In January 2025, Sindarov began working with the chess coach Roman Vidonyak.

In May, Sindarov won the TePe Sigeman & Co chess tournament with a score of 4.5/7, ahead of Nils Grandelius and Yağız Kaan Erdoğmuş. In June, at the UzChess Cup Masters, Sindarov tied for first with R Praggnanandhaa and Nodirbek Abdusattorov on 5.5/9, but finished second after the blitz playoffs.

As the sixteenth seed in the Chess World Cup 2025, Sindarov defeated players including adjacent seed Yu Yangyi, Frederik Svane, and José Martínez Alcántara to reach the semifinals against fellow countryman Nodirbek Yakubboev. After winning in the tiebreaks, Sindarov advanced to the finals against Wei Yi and qualified for the 2026 Candidates Tournament. He then drew the first two classical games, as well the first game of the tiebreak, before defeating Wei Yi in the second tiebreak game to become both the first Uzbek and the youngest World Cup winner ever at 19 years, 11 months, and 18 days.

=== 2026 ===
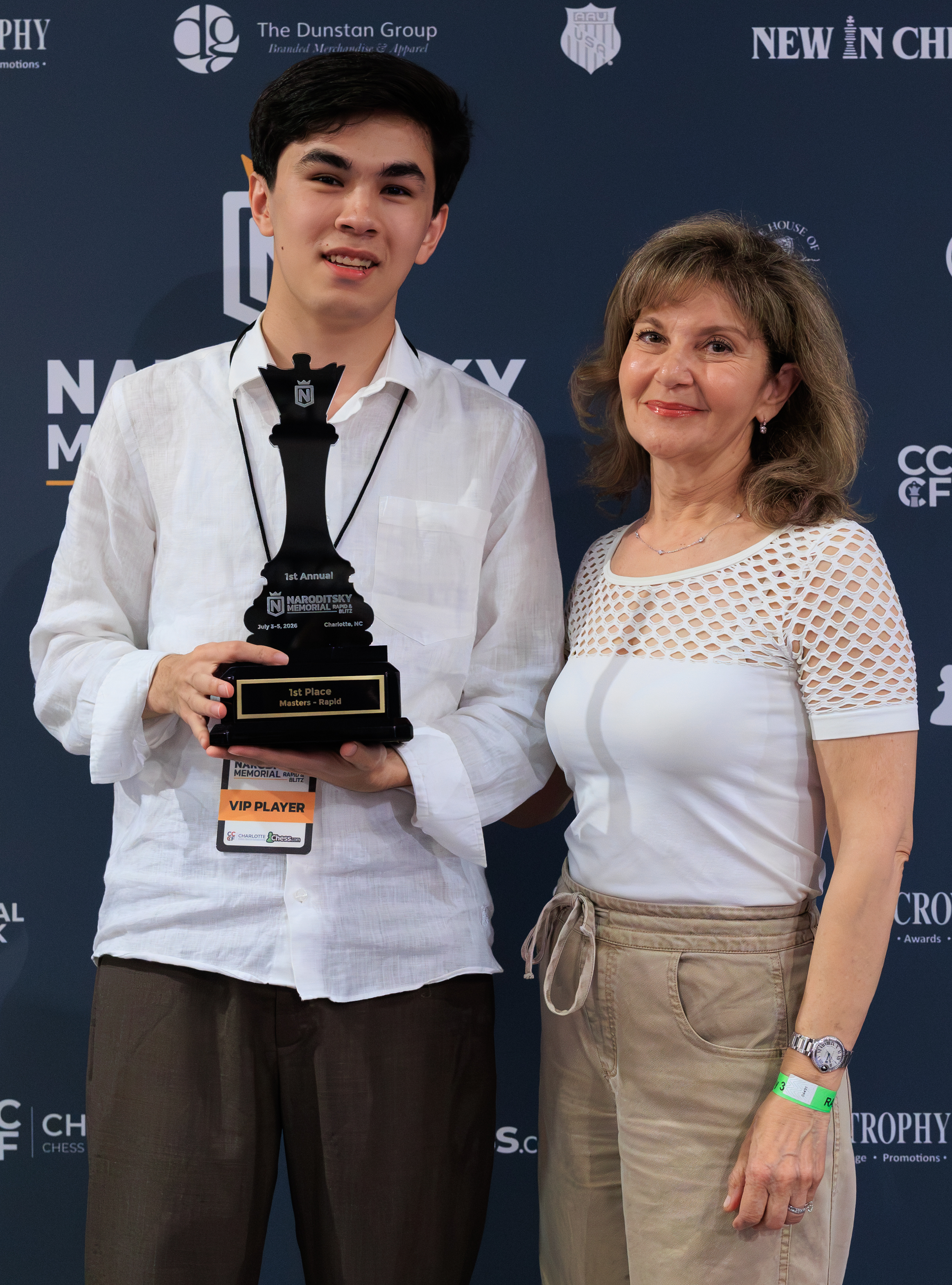
Sindarov with Daniel Naroditsky's mother, Elena, at the Naroditsky Memorial 2026

In April, Sindarov won the Candidates Tournament 2026 with a score of 10/14, the highest score ever achieved in a Candidates Tournament in the current double round-robin format. He qualified to challenge Gukesh Dommaraju for the World Chess Championship in late 2026, joining Anand (2014) and Nepomniachtchi (2022) as one of three players to have secured his victory in this Candidates format with a round to spare.

His tournament coach was Vidonyak, and Mukhiddin Madaminov was his second, along with two others that Sindarov declined to name until after his match with Gukesh. After his Candidates win, Sindarov was awarded the Order of Mehnat Shuhrati (Labour Glory) by the president of Uzbekistan, Shavkat Mirziyoyev.

In May, his 53-game unbeaten streak in classical chess was ended by R Praggnanandhaa in round two of the 2026 GCT Super Chess Classic Romania. Sindarov finished the tournament tied 3rd-4th with a score of 5/9 (+2-1=6). In July, he won both the rapid and blitz portions of the Naroditsky Memorial 2026, and overtook compatriot Nodirbek Abdusattorov's lead in the 2026–2027 FIDE Circuit.

In September, he played as board two for the gold medal-winning Uzbek team at the 46th Chess Olympiad in Samarkand. His score of 7/10 (+5−1=4) with a performance rating of 2797 resulted in him winning an individual bronze medal. In October, he won the rapid tournament Clutch Chess: Champions Showdown ahead of Praggnanandhaa R, Fabiano Caruana and Hikaru Nakamura with a score of 20.5/36.

World Chess Championship 2026
	Rating	Match games														Points
	Rating	1	2	3	4	5	6	7	8	9	10	11	12	13	14	Points
Javokhir Sindarov (UZB)	2782															
Gukesh Dommaraju (IND)	2710															

== Playing style ==
Sindarov is known for his aggressive and dynamic playing style and his ability to maintain constant pressure. In his youth he favoured sharp tactics and piece sacrifices, but he now prefers complex strategic positions where he can outplay his opponents.

His coach, Roman Vidonyak, describes him as possessing a "universal talent" with "all the arsenal of skills that super-grandmasters possess", noting his natural sense of harmony on the board, fast and fearless decision-making, and exceptional opening preparation.

Sindarov said in April 2026, "If I get a dynamic position with any colour, I will be very happy." He is known for excellent time management, often playing quickly even in complex positions while his opponents spend considerable time thinking, allowing him to capitalise on time pressure.

His preparation for the 2026 Candidates Tournament was exceptional, with Sindarov accurately predicting what would appear on the board multiple times, even into the endgame. When under pressure, as in his second game against Fabiano Caruana, his defensive technique proved precise and assured.

== Personal life ==
Sindarov is in a relationship with the Kazakh grandmaster Bibisara Assaubayeva, a three-time Women's World Blitz Champion. Both competed in their respective Candidates Tournaments in Cyprus in April 2026, with Assaubayeva finishing second in the Women's Candidates.

He is a fan of FC Barcelona and enjoys watching football as his favorite leisure activity. During his teenage years, he enjoyed playing the video game Counter-Strike for hours daily before refocusing on chess in 2021.

== Notable games ==
- Firouzja vs Sindarov, World Cup 2021, 0–1 – Major upset in round 2; Sindarov (rated 2544) defeated the 8th seed in tiebreaks
- Sindarov vs Abdusattorov, UzChess Cup 2024, 1–0 – Victory over higher-rated compatriot (rated 2766 at the tournament) in round 4
- Sindarov vs Caruana, Candidates 2026, 1–0 – Dominant performance against the pre-tournament favorite in round 4
- Wei Yi vs Sindarov, Candidates 2026, 0–1 – Key victory in round 6 to establish a commanding 1.5-point lead
- Giri vs Sindarov, Candidates 2026, ½–½ – Clinching draw in round 13 to secure tournament victory with a round to spare
