= Japan Chess Association =

The Japan Chess Association (日本チェス協会 Nihon Chesu Kyōkai, JCA) was the governing chess organization in Japan and was affiliated to FIDE. However, having never been registered as a non-profit organization or any other kind of juridical entity in Japan, it is considered a personal business of its representative. In order to participate in the 2006 and 2010 Asian Games chess competitions, it temporarily joined the Japanese Olympic Committee as an associate member but later withdrew. Similarly, it joined the Japan Anti-Doping Agency (JADA) but later withdrew.

Since the passing of former president Yasuji Matsumoto in January 2003, the post of president was vacant. JCA had no vice-president, board of directors, or auditors. Miyoko Watai was the self-appointed "acting president", although in principle that title could not be used officially since the previous president's terms of office had long since expired.

As described further below, JCA was repeatedly criticized due to the lack of financial transparency, as well as behaviour contradicting the regulations of the parent federation, FIDE.

In January 2019, the National Chess Society of Japan replaced JCA as the governing chess organization in Japan. In 2023, NCS Japan changed its name to Japan Chess Federation. The new national organisation has a board, has published accounts, and published lists of members.

== History and overview ==
- History：
  - Established in 1967 as the Japan Tournament Chess Association (日本トーナメントチェス協会 Nihon Tōnamento Chesu Kyokai).
  - In October 1968 it became the 75th member of FIDE, and was then renamed Japan Chess Association. The first president was Akira Komatsu.
  - In 1972 Komatsu resigned from presidency.
  - Yasuji Matsumoto became acting president in 1974, and president in 1977.
  - In January 2003, Matsumoto suddenly died. Following JCA regulations, general secretary Miyoko Watai became acting president for the remaining term.
  - In January 2007 four years had lapsed since the passing of Matsumoto, but Watai has remained as self-styled "acting president" until today.
- Headquarters location: Nishi-Kamata 7-7-7-504, Ota Ward, Tokyo.
- Chess Centre: a chess club and store run by JCA for many years in a studio apartment in Ikegami, Ota Ward. It closed down in January 2018.
- JCA publishes a newsletter for members, Chesu Tsushin (チェス通信).
- Number of members: unknown. Detailed numbers were never published.
- World ranking: 93rd (as of November 2018).
- It has participated in the biennial Chess Olympiad since its accession to FIDE. In 2010 it took the 96th place, in 2012 the 123rd place (its lowest in history), in 2014 the 73rd place, and in 2016 the 68th place. Initially it was also represented in the qualifiers for the individual World Chess Championship, but participation frequency declined and since 2009 no player from Japan has competed in those qualifiers. Besides FIDE events, it has also sent players to events such as the World Mind Sports Games (WMSG).
- Despite being a FIDE member for over 50 years, as of 2018 JCA is still eligible to support from FIDE's Development Commission (DEV), being rated Level 3 along with primarily developing countries.

== Main events ==
Items in bold indicate FIDE-rated events.

- **Japanese Chess Championship** (May)
- Junior Championship, Senior Championship, Elementary School Championship (July)
- **Japan League** (August)
- Club Championship, Women's Championship (September)
- Japan Open (November)
- Collegiate Championship (December)

== Criticism ==
=== Lack of financial transparency ===
There were no elections after the death of former president Matsumoto. Since JCA was not a juridical person it was not subject to auditing, and it refused to disclose financial information to its members.

JCA regulations stated that "JCA shall entrust business involving financial risks to KK Japan Chess Association Business Division (JCAB)" . In addition, in order for members to participate in the administration, it was necessary first to form a regional club federation and then appoint a representative to a board meeting. However, members of the board meeting are required to keep a confidentiality agreement and therefore regular members cannot get hold of any financial information concerning JCA.

JCA resold a variety of chess products. Although JCA claimed to offer “special prices for members” as one of the perks of membership, almost all products are offered at above market rates, with some products costing up to double the price charged elsewhere. In addition, the only books in the "Recommended for Beginners" section are two books authored by Miyoko Watai.

=== Problems concerning statutes and regulations ===
The FIDE Laws of chess, article 8.3 states that "the scoresheets are the property of the organiser of the competition", implying the paper used to score the game is property of the organiser. In JCA's Japanese translation, however, that article is translated as "the scoresheets, as well as its recorded contents, are the property of the organiser of the competition" (bold added for emphasis). This goes against the chess tradition of considering chess scores as public domain once published.

In case a member publishes an opinion or proposal concerning JCA using the internet, that in itself is considered grounds for automatically rejecting the proposal. In addition, such a member can be subject to penalties.

JCA requires players competing in international events to cover the expenses of JCA's so-called "officers".

=== Recent administration ===
In 2013, major organization mishaps occurred in the Japan Championship, in the Women's Championship and in the Japan League.
