= Wei Yi =

Chinese chess grandmaster (born 1999)

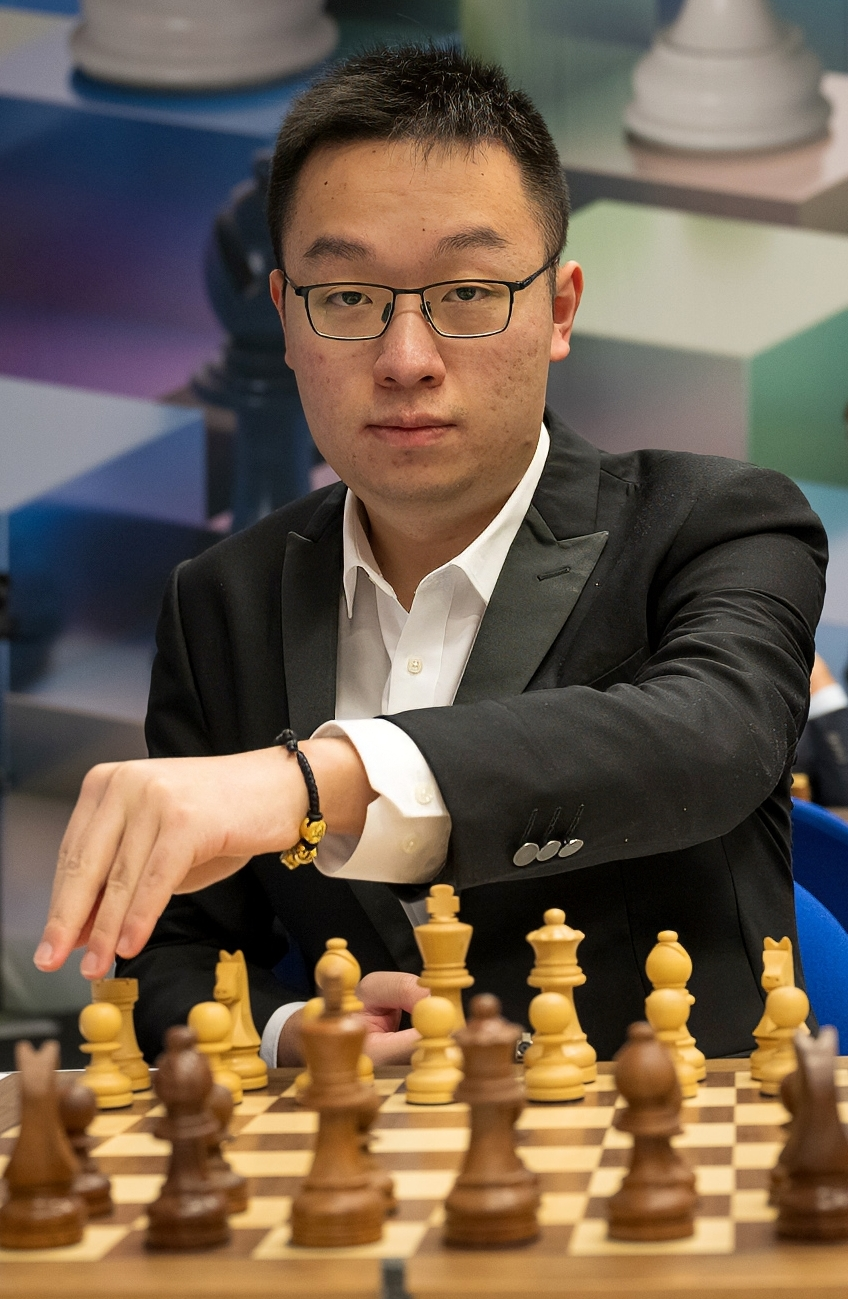
- Wei in 2025

Personal information
- Born: 2 June 1999 (age 27) Yancheng, Jiangsu, China
- Education: Tsinghua University

Chess career
- Country: China
- Title: Grandmaster (2013)
- FIDE rating: 2758 (October 2026)
- Peak rating: 2763 (October 2024)
- Ranking: No. 9 (October 2026)
- Peak ranking: No. 7 (March 2025)

Chinese name
- Traditional Chinese: 韋奕
- Simplified Chinese: 韦奕
Transcriptions
Standard Mandarin
- Hanyu Pinyin: Wéi Yì
- IPA: [wěɪ î]

Wei Yi (Chinese: 韦奕; born 2 June 1999) is a Chinese chess grandmaster. Wei became a grandmaster at the age of 13 years, 8 months and 23 days, the 11th youngest in history (fourth at the time). He was the youngest player ever to reach a rating of 2700, accomplishing this feat at age 15 (Although this was surpassed by Yağız Kaan Erdoğmuş in April 2026, who broke 2700 at 14 years and 10 months). Wei represents the Jiangsu club in the China Chess League and is a three-time Chinese Chess Champion, 2018 Asian Chess Champion and 2022 Asian Games Men's individual rapid champion. He won the Tata Steel Masters in 2024.

He was runner up in the 2025 Chess World Cup and qualified to the 2026 Candidates Tournament.

== Early life and education ==
Wei was born on 2 June 1999 in Yancheng, Jiangsu, China. In 2018, he enrolled as a student at the Tsinghua University School of Economics and Management. He finished his studies in July 2024.

== Career ==
=== Early years ===
In 2007, he competed in the Chinese Chess Championship B group at the age of 8, recording a draw against Grandmaster Zhou Jianchao.

In 2009, Wei Yi won the under 11 section of the 5th World School Chess Championship, held in Thessaloniki, Greece.

In 2010, he won the under-12 event at the Asian Youth Chess Championship and followed this up by winning the same division at the World Youth Chess Championship.

=== 2012 ===
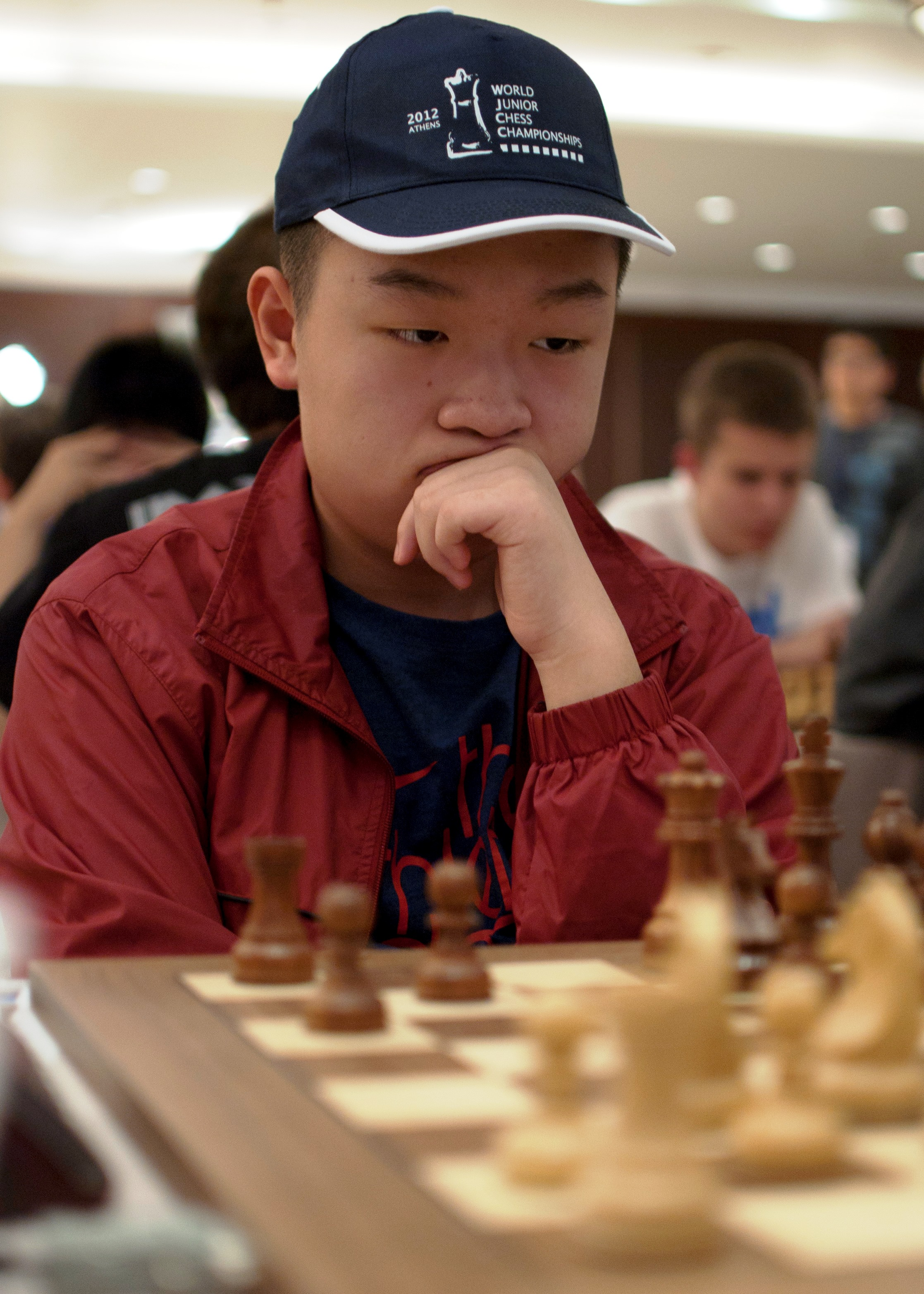
Wei Yi playing at the 2012 World Junior Chess Championship

In August, he won his first GM norm at the World Junior Chess Championship in Athens, including a victory over Richárd Rapport and a draw with the eventual winner Alexander Ipatov; when Wei was only 12. The competition is open to participants under-20 at 1 January.

In October, he gained his second GM norm at the Indonesian Open Chess Championship, with victories over Michał Krasenkow and Sergey Fedorchuk.

=== 2013 ===
In February, he secured his final norm at the Reykjavik Open with a score of 7½/10, including a victory over Maxime Vachier-Lagrave, finishing 6th.

In August, he made his debut at the FIDE World Cup, held that year in Tromsø, being one of the FIDE president's nominees. He defeated Ian Nepomniachtchi in the first round and Alexei Shirov in the second, then was knocked out by Shakhriyar Mamedyarov in the third round.

On the November FIDE rating list, Wei, aged 14 years, four months and 30 days, reached a rating of 2604, thus becoming the youngest player in history to achieve a rating above 2600, breaking the record held by Wesley So. This record has since been broken by John M. Burke.

=== 2014 ===
In June, Wei won the 27th Magistral de León rapid tournament by defeating Francisco Vallejo Pons in the final.

In August, he played on the reserve board for China in the 41st Chess Olympiad in Tromsø. He scored 4/5, helping the Chinese team to win the gold medal.

In October he finished second in the World Junior Championship in Pune, India behind Lu Shanglei.

=== 2015 ===
In January, he won the Challenger Group at the Tata Steel Chess Tournament with a score of 10½/13 (+8-0=5) and a rating performance of 2804, ahead of David Navara and without any defeat. By doing so, he qualified for the Masters section in 2016.

In February, he competed in the Gibraltar Masters tournament and finished in a share of 3rd–11th. This boosted Wei's rating to 2706 in the March rating list, making Wei Yi the youngest player ever to cross the 2700 mark at the time. The record had previously been held by Magnus Carlsen.

In April, Wei took part in the World Team Chess Championship, which was won by the Chinese team. Wei scored 7/9 (+5=4-0) and won the gold medal on board 4.

In May, Wei won the Chinese Championship, beating Ding Liren, Wang Hao and Yu Yangyi to the title and in the process becoming the youngest Chinese chess champion ever.

In June, he won his second consecutive Magistral de León rapid tournament, defeating Maxime Vachier-Lagrave in the final.

At the Chess World Cup 2015, Wei sequentially knocked out Saleh Salem, Yuri Vovk, Alexander Areshchenko, and compatriot Ding Liren to progress to the quarterfinals, becoming the youngest player in the Chess World Cup history to accomplish this. Then he lost to Peter Svidler in the second set of rapid tiebreakers (10'+10") and therefore was eliminated from the competition.

In the inaugural edition of the China Chess King Match, held in Taizhou, Zhejiang and featuring most of the top Chinese players, Wei Yi sequentially knocked out Zhao Jun, Yu Yangyi and Bu Xiangzhi to win the event. The format of this event was identical to that of the Chess World Cup.

=== 2016 ===
In January, Wei Yi played in the Tata Steel Chess Tournament Masters section, for which he qualified by winning the Challengers section in 2015. He finished seventh out of fourteen participants with a score of 6½/13.

In April, Wei Yi won the Chinese Chess Championship for the second time in his career, scoring 7½/11 (+4 =5 -0).

Wei played in the Bilbao Chess Masters Final in July, which included five players from the world's top 10: Wesley So, Hikaru Nakamura, Anish Giri, the world title challenger Sergey Karjakin and the world champion Magnus Carlsen. Wei won against Giri playing with white, lost against eventual winner Carlsen playing with black and drew all other games, finishing with a score of +1 =8 -1 to take third place.

=== 2017 ===
In January, Wei Yi participated again in the annual traditional Tata Steel Tournament finishing fifth.

In May, Wei Yi won the Chinese championship for the third time in a row with a score of 8½/11 (+6 =5 -0).

In July, he won his first super-tournament at the 8th Danzhou Super-GM event ahead of the likes of Ding Liren, Vassily Ivanchuk and Yu Yangyi with 6½/9, a full point clear of the field.

=== 2018 ===
In December, Wei Yi won the Asian Continental Championship in Makati, the Philippines. He scored 6½/9 points and took the title on tiebreak from Amin Tabatabaei and Lê Quang Liêm. Thanks to this achievement Wei also qualified for the FIDE World Cup 2019.

=== 2019 ===
In December 2019, Wei Yi reached the finals of the fourth stage of the prestigious FIDE Grand Prix 2019 Tournament (after outplaying David Navara in the semi-finals on tie-breaks), losing to Ian Nepomniachtchi. He came sixth place overall in the tournament.

=== 2022 ===
Wei Yi was runner-up in the FTX Road to Miami tournament, losing to Levon Aronian in the finals.

=== 2023 ===
In September, Wei Yi won a gold medal in the Men's individual rapid event at 2022 Asian Games, with a score of 7½/9.

=== 2024 ===
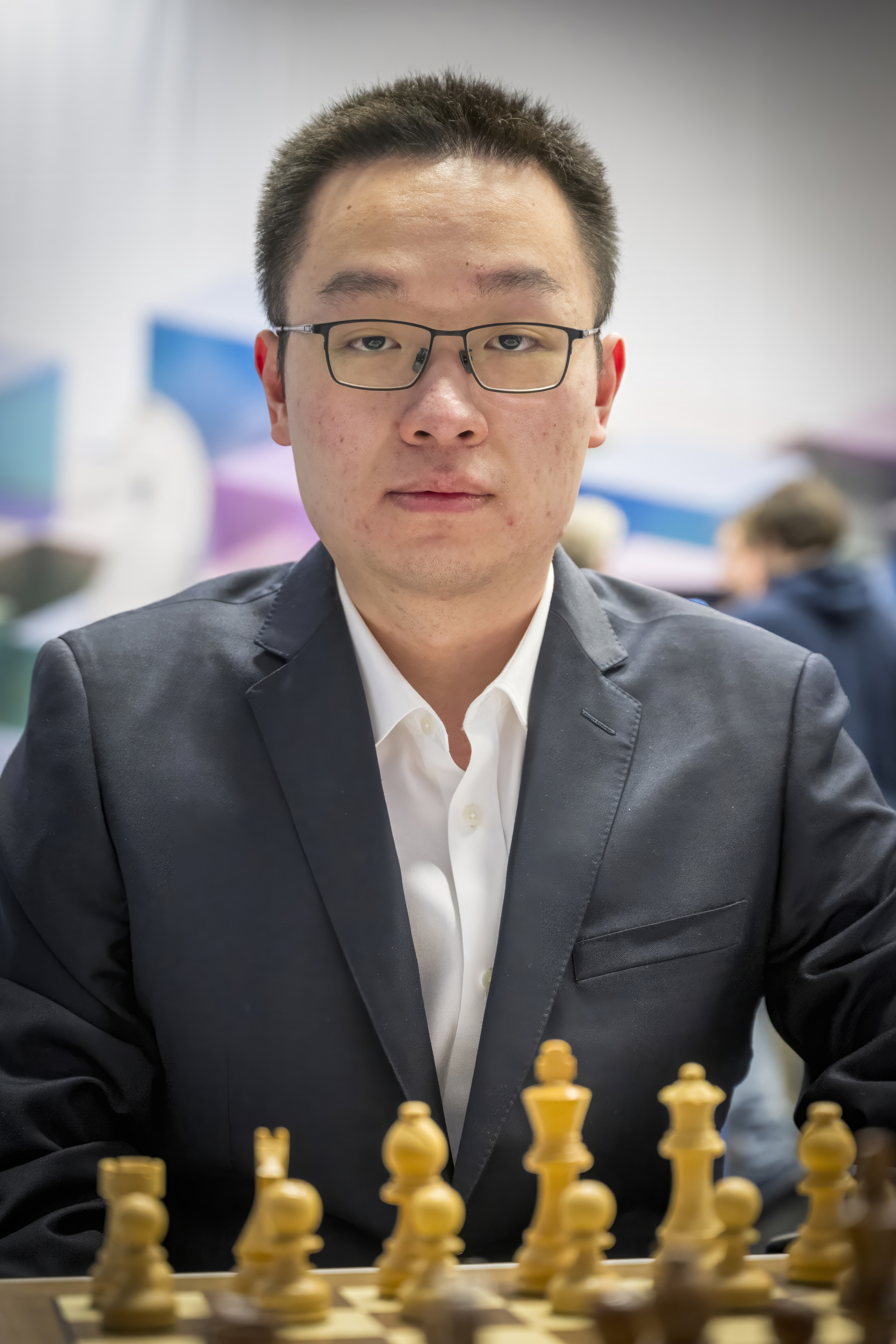
Wei Yi playing at the 2024 Tata Steel Chess Tournament

In January, Wei Yi won the Tata Steel Chess Tournament 2024 after defeating Nodirbek Abdusattorov and Gukesh Dommaraju in the tiebreaks. With this result, he achieved his personal best rating of 2755, ranked 9th in the world.

In May, Wei Yi came second place overall in the 2024 Superbet Rapid & Blitz Poland tournament with a score of 25½. He came first in the Rapid section of the tournament.

Wei Yi played on board two for China at the 45th Chess Olympiad, scoring 6½/10 (+5−2=3) with a performance rating of 2742.

=== 2025 ===
Wei Yi finished 6th in Tata Steel Chess Tournament 2025, scoring 7 points. He was undefeated with 12 draws and 1 win. He finished 3rd in Prague International Chess Festival 2025.

At the Chess World Cup 2025, Wei Yi defeated Kacper Piorun 2-0 in the second round. He then went on to defeat Benjamin Gledura 2.5-1.5, Parham Maghsoodloo 5-3, and Samuel Sevian 1.5-0.5 in the third, fourth and fifth round respectively. In the Quarterfinals, he defeated Arjun Erigaisi 2.5-1.5 to reach the Semifinals. By defeating Andrey Esipenko in the tiebreaks, he qualified for the Candidates for the first time. He came runner up after losing to Javokhir Sindarov in the finals 1.5-2.5 from the tiebreaks.

=== 2026 ===
In March-April, Wei Yi participated in the Candidates Tournament 2026, finishing 4th with a score of 7/14 (+2−2=10).

In June, Wei Yi was part of the Dragon Chilling team that won double gold at World Rapid and Blitz Team Chess Championships 2026.

== Notable games ==
Wei Yi vs Bruzon Batista, Danzhou 2015

Position: a8 black queen, e8 black rook, d7 black rook, a6 black pawn, d6 black pawn, g6 black pawn, b5 black pawn, e5 black pawn, g5 black bishop, a3 white pawn, h3 black king, b2 white pawn, c2 white pawn, e2 white queen, h2 white pawn, e1 white bishop, f1 white rook, g1 white king

Final position
- Wei Yi vs. Lazaro Bruzon Batista, 6th Hainan Danzhou (2015). This has been described as "Game of the Decade", with a king walk reminiscent of the famous 1912 game between Edward Lasker and Sir George Thomas.
- Wei Yi vs. Anne Haast, Tata Steel Group B (2015)
- Wei Yi vs. Alexei Shirov, World Cup 2013
- Wei Yi vs. Sergey Karjakin, Tata Steel-Masters 2017
- Wei Yi vs. Max Warmerdam, Tata Steel Masters 2024 A Bishop’s Opening Vienna with 5.f4
