= Matthias Blübaum =

German chess grandmaster (born 1997)

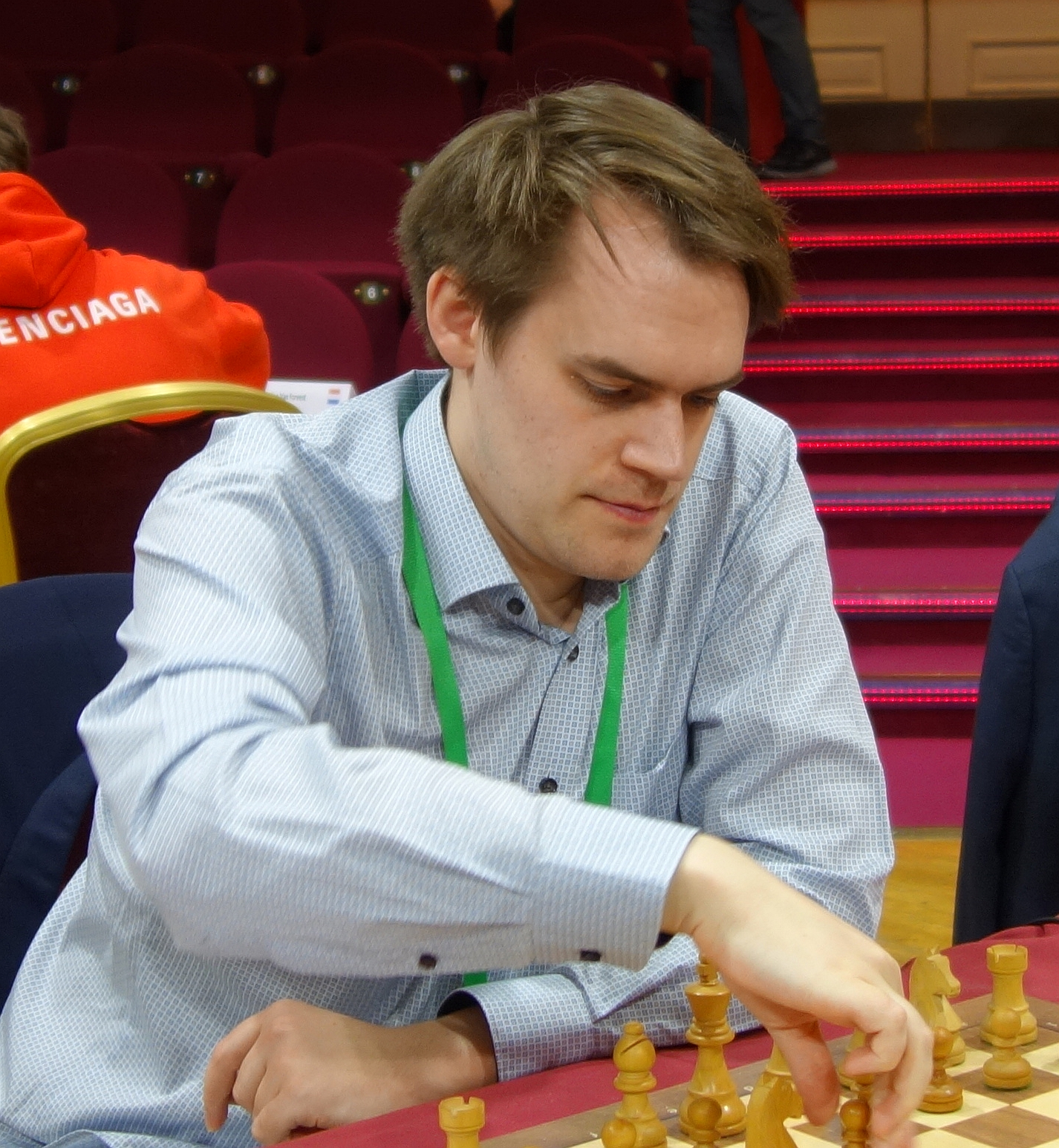
- Blübaum in 2023

Personal information
- Born: 18 April 1997 (age 29) Lemgo, Germany

Chess career
- Country: Germany
- Title: Grandmaster (2015)
- FIDE rating: 2662 (September 2026)
- Peak rating: 2698 (March 2026)
- Ranking: No. 52 (September 2026)
- Peak ranking: No. 32 (March 2026)

Matthias Blübaum (born 18 April 1997) is a German chess grandmaster. He won the European Individual Chess Championship in 2022 and in 2025.

Blübaum began playing chess at the age of six. He earned his international master title in 2012 and was awarded the grandmaster title in 2015. A member of the German team that won the 2015 European Youth Team Chess Championship, he has since represented his nation at the European Team Chess Championship and Chess Olympiad.

In September 2025, he qualified for the Candidates Tournament 2026 as a result of his second place finish at the FIDE Grand Swiss Tournament 2025, scoring 7.5/11 points.

== Personal life ==
Matthias Blübaum was born in Lemgo, North Rhine-Westphalia, on 18 April 1997, and comes from a chess family. His father, Karl-Ernst, won the Ostwestfalen Chess Championship several times. He has three sisters, two of whom competed in the top group of the German Girls' Chess Championship.

Blübaum skipped ahead a year in elementary school and received his Abitur at the age of 17. As of 2016, he was studying physics and mathematics at Bielefeld University. In a 2020 interview, he stated that he was still unsure whether he would become a professional chess player. As of 2021, he was studying for his master's degree in mathematics.

== Chess career ==
=== Prinzengruppe ===
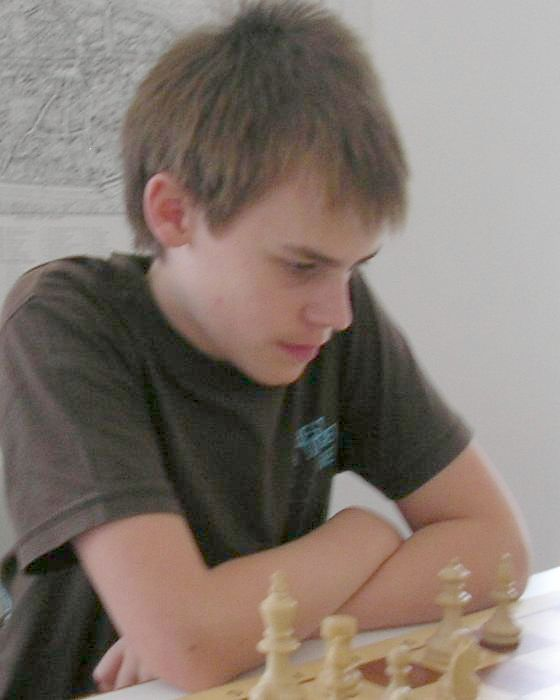
Blübaum in July 2010

Blübaum learned to play chess when he was six years old, and began a systematic training schedule at the age of eight. He received wide attention at the age of 12 as part of the Prinzengruppe, a group of four young, talented German players ("princes") who were projected to become grandmasters ("kings") by German national junior coach Bernd Vökler. The group, consisting of Blübaum, Rasmus Svane, Dennis Wagner, and Alexander Donchenko, completed the objective set for them in 2016, when Svane earned his final grandmaster (GM) norm and thus became the fourth and final member of the group to achieve the title of GM.

The German Chess Federation named Blübaum the U14 Player of the Year of 2011. Notable achievements in the year were his attainment of the FIDE master title and his third-place finish at the German U18 Chess Championship. Also in 2011, he placed sixth at the World U14 Chess Championship, scoring 6½/9 (+5–1=3).

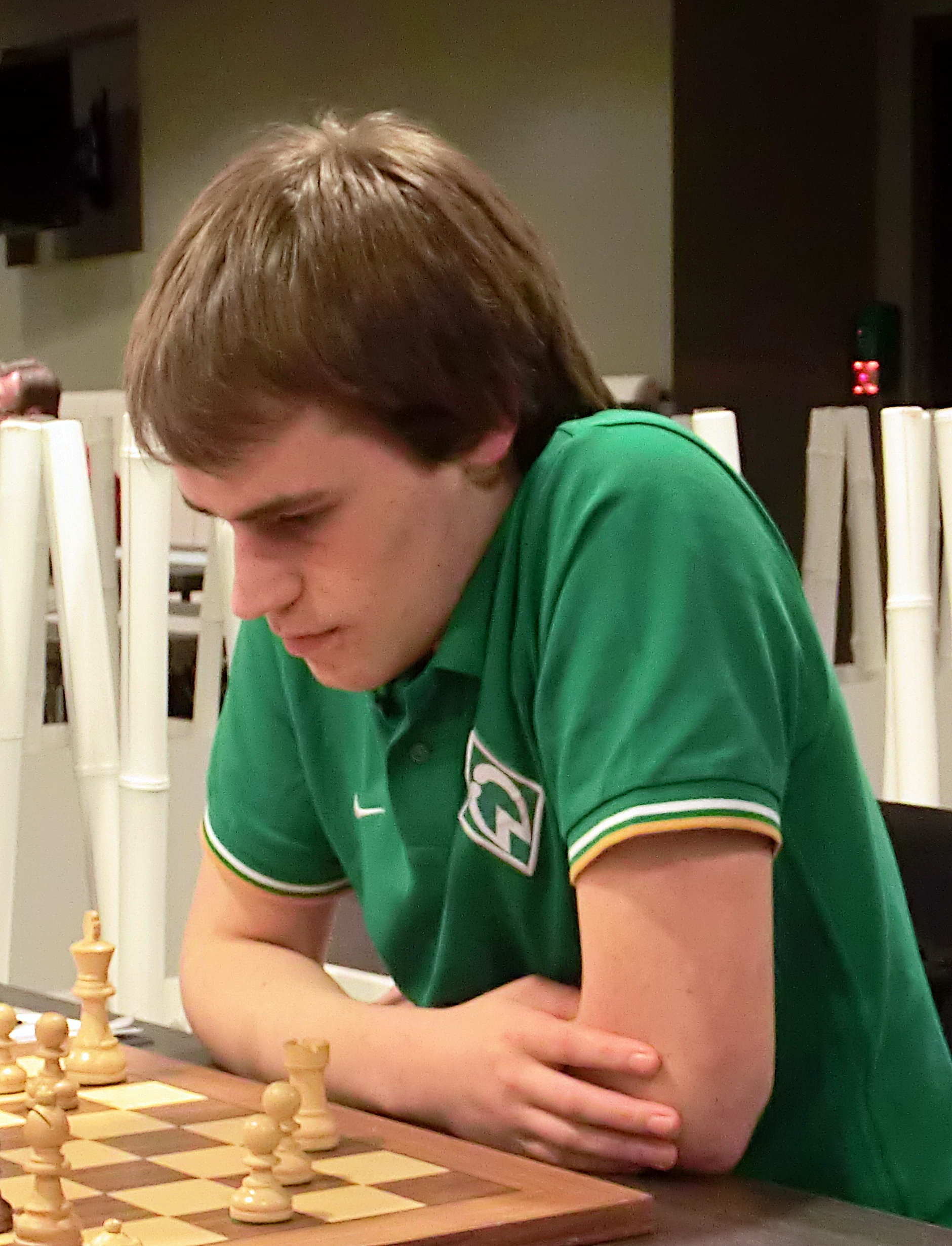
Blübaum competing for Werder Bremen in the Chess Bundesliga, October 2013

Blübaum earned his first international master (IM) norm at the Neckar-Open in April 2011, scoring 6½/9, and his second at the Dortmund Sparkassen Chess Meeting in July 2011, scoring 6/9. He achieved his final IM norm at the German Chess Championship in March 2012, scoring 5½/9. He was awarded the title by FIDE in April 2012, at the age of 14. He participated in the World Junior Chess Championship in August, placing twenty-fifth with a score of 8/13 (+6–3=4), and in the World U18 Chess Championship in November, scoring 7/11 (+5–2=4) for a fourteenth-place finish. He placed twelfth in the 2013 German Chess Championship, scoring 5½/9 (+3–1=5).

Blübaum earned his first two GM norms in the 2012/2013 and 2013/2014 Chess Bundesliga seasons, with scores of 6½/9 and 8/12, respectively. In September 2014, he competed in the 2nd Grenke Chess Classic, scoring 3½/7 (+2–2=3) for a fifth-place finish. He scored his first victory over a 2700+ opponent in this event, defeating the German No. 1 Arkadij Naiditsch in the second round. Later in September, Blübaum competed again in the World U18 Chess Championship, placing fourth with a score of 7½/11 (+5–1=5). At the 2014 Bavarian Chess Championship, held from 25 October to 2 November, he achieved his third GM norm, scoring 7/9. He earned an additional GM norm at the German Chess Championship in November 2014, scoring 6/9. He was officially awarded the GM title by FIDE in April 2015, at the age of 18.

In July 2015, he competed for Germany on board 1 at the European Youth Team Chess Championship. He scored 5½/7 (+4–0=3), helping Germany win the tournament. In September, he placed third at the World Junior Chess Championship with 9/13 (+6–1=6), one point behind Jan-Krzysztof Duda and Mikhail Antipov. Antipov won the tournament due to a better tiebreak score than Duda.

=== 2016 ===
Blübaum recorded several tournament victories in 2016. He won the Grenke Chess Open held in March, scoring 7½/9 (+6–0=3). Vladimir Fedoseev, Nikita Vitiugov, Miloš Perunović, Ni Hua and Francisco Vallejo Pons also scored 7½/9; Blübaum won due to performing best on the tiebreak system. In April, he finished clear first in the Accentus Young Masters tournament with 7/9 (+6–1=2), half a point ahead of Benjámin Gledura and Noël Studer. He won the Xtracon Chess Open in July, scoring 8/10 (+6–0=4). Alexei Shirov, Bassem Amin, Jonathan Carlstedt, Mihail Marin, Jon Ludvig Hammer and Jean-Marc Degraeve also finished on 8/10; Blübaum won on tiebreak.

In September, he competed for Germany on board 3 at the 42nd Chess Olympiad. He was his nation's best performer, scoring 7½/10 (+6–1=3) for a performance rating of 2744. In the final round of the tournament, he defeated Tarvo Seeman of Estonia from a drawn position, which gave the gold medal to the United States. If Blübaum had drawn with Seeman, Ukraine would have won gold by way of the Sonneborn–Berger tiebreak system.

=== 2017 ===
Blübaum competed in the Aeroflot Open, held from 21 February to 1 March. He tied for 21st with Abhijeet Gupta on a score of 5½/9. Later in March, he participated in the first edition of the Sharjah Masters tournament, scoring 6½/9 for an 18th-place finish. In April, he competed in the 4th Grenke Chess Classic, having received an invitation to the event after winning the 2016 Grenke Chess Open. It was his first elite round-robin tournament. He tied for last with a score of 2/7 (+0–3=4), recording draws with Fabiano Caruana, Magnus Carlsen, Hou Yifan and Georg Meier, and losing to Levon Aronian, Arkadij Naiditsch and Maxime Vachier-Lagrave.

From 30 May to 10 June, Blübaum took part in the 2017 European Individual Chess Championship. He scored 8/11 (+6–1=4), half a point behind Maxim Matlakov, Baadur Jobava and Vladimir Fedoseev who all tied for first–third. Matlakov won the tournament on tiebreak. Blübaum placed 12th, and so qualified for the Chess World Cup. Also in June, he won the German Chess Federation's 2016 U20 Player of the Year award, in recognition of his three tournament victories and strong performance at the 42nd Chess Olympiad.

He competed in the 45th Dortmund Sparkassen Chess Meeting, held from 15 to 22 July. He finished fifth, scoring 3/7 (+1–2=4). Earlier in July, he transferred from SV Werder Bremen to Schachfreunde Deizisau e.V. in a switch-up of his Chess Bundesliga team. He had played for SV Werden Bremen from 2012 up until this move. In September, he participated in the Chess World Cup 2017. He defeated Sandro Mareco 1½–½ in the first round to advance to the second round, where he was paired with Wesley So. He drew with So in the classical portion of the match, then was defeated in the rapid tiebreaks and eliminated from the tournament. From 28 October to 6 November, he competed for Germany on board 3 at the 2017 European Team Chess Championship. He scored 4½/8 (+3–2=3) as Germany placed eighth.

=== 2018 ===
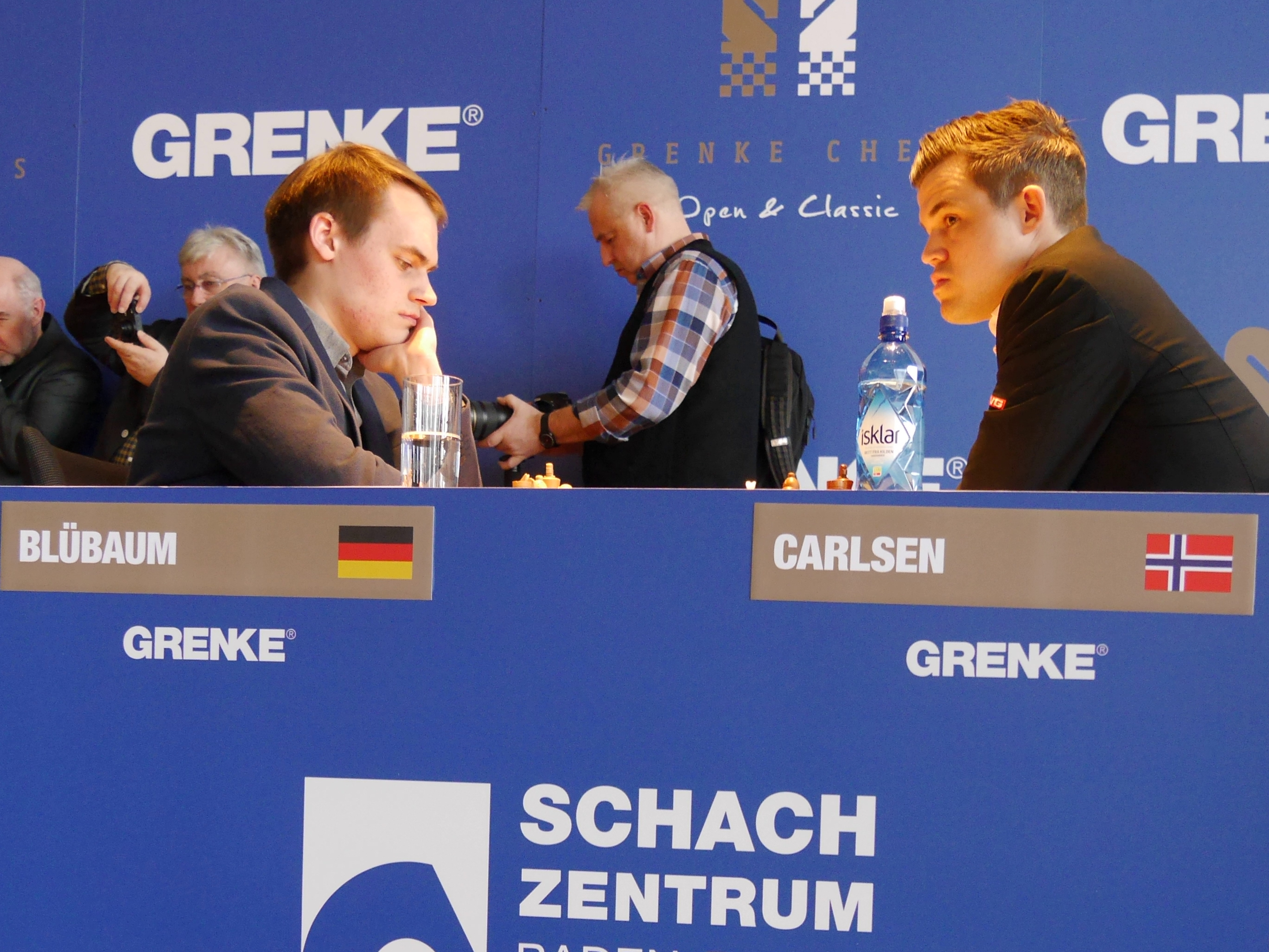
Blübaum against Carlsen at the 5th Grenke Chess Classic, 2 April 2018

In January, Blübaum competed in the Tata Steel Challengers. He finished seventh, scoring 6½/13 (+3–3=7). In February, he participated in the Aeroflot Open. He placed 63rd out of 92, scoring 4/9 (+0–1=8).

From 31 March to 9 April, Blübaum participated in the 5th Grenke Chess Classic. He finished sixth with a score of 4½/9 (+1–1=7), recording a victory over Viswanathan Anand in the process. In May, he was named the 2017 U20 Player of the Year by the German Chess Federation, receiving 24.6% of the vote. He competed in the Riga Technical University Open in August. He performed poorly; as the second seed, he finished 36th with 6/9 (+4–1=4).

Blübaum represented Germany on board 3 at the 43rd Chess Olympiad, from 24 September to 5 October. He went undefeated, scoring 6/10 (+2–0=8), as Germany finished 13th with 16/22 (+5–0=6) match points. In December, he competed in the Zürich Christmas Open. As the second seed, he placed 14th with a score of 4½/7 (+3–1=3).

=== 2019 ===
In March, Blübaum participated in the European Individual Chess Championship. He placed 46th with 7/11 (+4–1=6). From 18 to 22 April, he competed in the Grenke Chess Open. He tied for 1st–8th on 7½/9 (+6–0=3), finishing sixth on tiebreak. Daniel Fridman won the event. Blübaum placed fifth out of eight at the German Masters, held in Magdeburg from 25 May to 1 June. He scored 4/7 (+1–0=6).

At the FIDE Grand Swiss Tournament 2019 held on the Isle of Man from 10 to 21 October, Blübaum placed 81st with 5½/11 (+2–2=7). He represented Germany again at the European Team Chess Championship in Batumi, from 24 October to 2 November. He scored 3½/6 (+1–0=5) as Germany placed eighth.

=== 2020 ===
In January, Blübaum won the 9th Volksbank-Cup with a perfect score of 9/9, the first in the tournament's history. In August, Blübaum won the German Blitz Championship, with a score of 25½/29 (+24–2=3), half-a-point ahead of Svane. Later in August, he competed in the German Masters, held in Magdeburg. He scored 5/7 (+3–0=4) to finish clear-first, with a performance rating of 2781.

Blübaum became the highest-rated German player for the first time in the October 2020 FIDE rating list, with a rating of 2672. From 31 October to 8 November, he participated in the Tegernsee Masters, placing second with 5/8 (+4–2=2), one-and-a-half points behind winner Alexander Donchenko.

=== 2021 ===
Blübaum competed in the Chess World Cup 2021 in July. Seeded 46th, he received a bye in the first round, then defeated Hungarian GM Viktor Erdős in the second round. He was defeated by Serbian GM Velimir Ivić in the third round.

In August, he defended his German Blitz Championship title, scoring 24/29 to win on tiebreak ahead of Daniel Fridman.

=== 2022 ===
From 27 March to 6 April 2022, Blübaum competed in the 2022 European Individual Chess Championship. He drew his first game, then won six in a row to lead the tournament. He drew his remaining four games to finish with a score of 8½/11, which tied him with Gabriel Sargissian. Blübaum won the tournament on tiebreak to become European champion.

Blübaum represented Germany on board 2 at the 44th Chess Olympiad, held in Chennai from 29 July to 9 August. He scored 5/10 (+3–3=4). Later in August, he won the German Blitz Championship for the third straight year. He scored 24½/29, four-and-a-half points ahead of runner-up Gerald Hertneck.

=== 2025 ===
In March, Blübaum participated in the European Individual Chess Championship 2025. He scored 8.5/11 (+6–0=5) and won the tournament on tiebreak, ahead of Frederik Svane and Maxim Rodshtein.

Blübaum tied for second place at the FIDE Grand Swiss Tournament 2025 with an unbeaten score of 7.5/11, and qualified for the 2026 Candidates Tournament on tiebreak.

=== 2026 ===
Blübaum played in the FIDE candidates tournament. He was touted as a serious underdog with his odds of winning the tournament being 1-88. During this tournament, due to his low odds, he has ironically been given the nickname "Bluebomb" and "DeepBlue Bomb," a nod to the IBM Supercomputer Deep Blue. He lost two games against Fabiano Caruana and Anish Giri, drawing the 12 others, ending in 6th place with 6 points out of 14, ahead of R. Praggnanandhaa (even on points but with a better Sonneborn–Berger score).
