= Roman Vidonyak =

German chess player and coach (born 1972)

Personal information
- Born: 19 August 1972 (age 53) Lviv, Ukrainian SSR, Soviet Union

Chess career
- Country: Soviet Union (until 1991); Ukraine (1991–2004); Germany (since 2004)
- Title: International Master (1994); FIDE Senior Trainer (2012)
- FIDE rating: 2442 (July 2026)
- Peak rating: 2452 (July 2002)

Roman Vidonyak (born 19 August 1972) is a German chess coach. His students include Javokhir Sindarov and Vladimir Fedoseev. He was awarded the title of International Master in 1994 and the title of FIDE Senior Trainer in 2012.
