= Andrey Esipenko =

Russian chess grandmaster (born 2002)

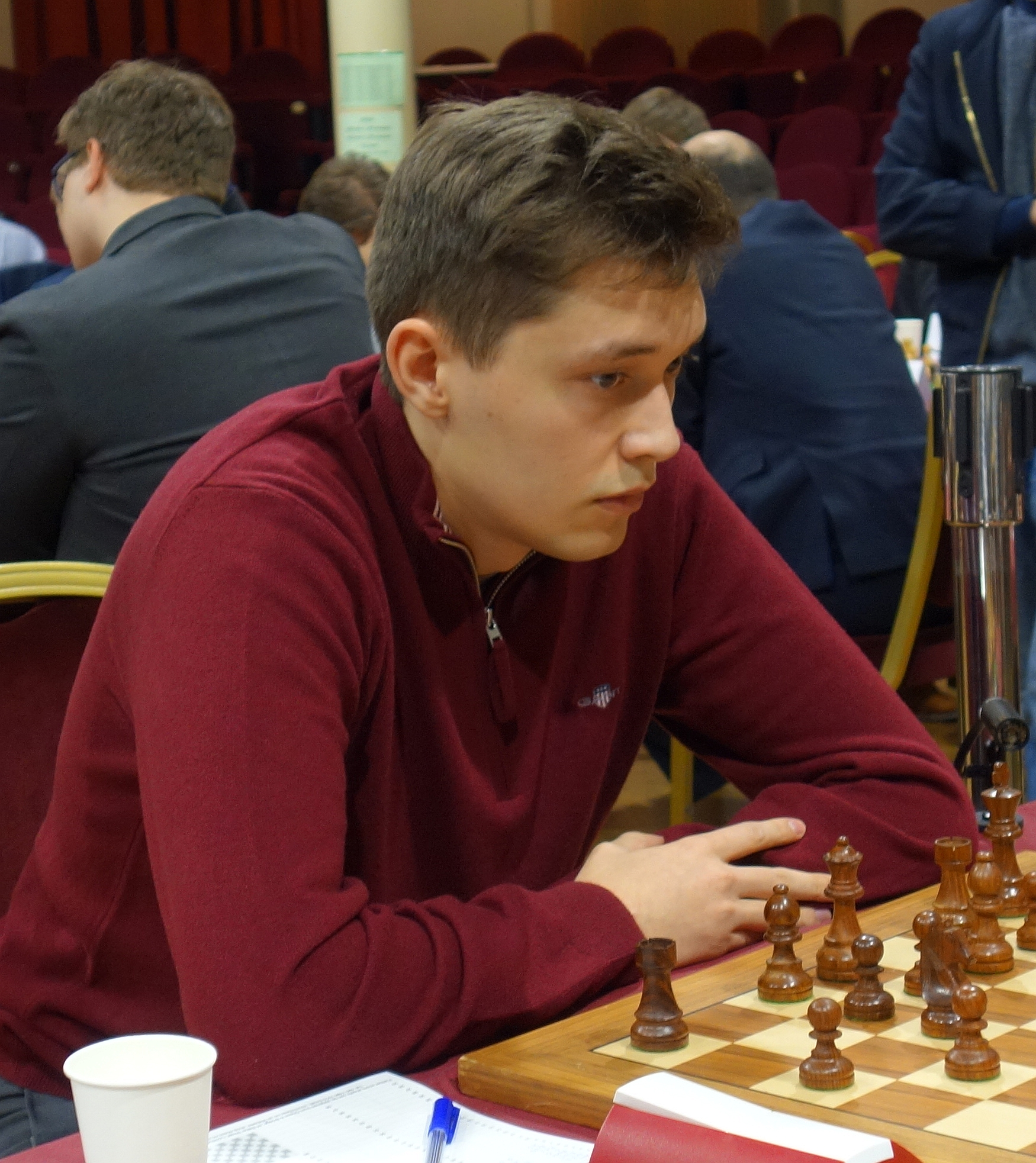
- Esipenko in 2023

Personal information
- Born: Andrey Evgenyevich Esipenko; 22 March 2002 (age 24) Novocherkassk, Russia

Chess career
- Country: Russia (until 2022, since 2025); FIDE (2022–2025)
- Title: Grandmaster (2018)
- FIDE rating: 2680 (October 2026)
- Peak rating: 2723 (March 2022)
- Ranking: No. 40 (October 2026)
- Peak ranking: No. 24 (March 2022)

Andrey Evgenyevich Esipenko (Note: Russian: Андрей Евгеньевич Есипенко, romanized: Andrey Yevgenyevich Yesipenko.) (born 22 March 2002) is a Russian chess grandmaster. He won the European U10 Chess Championship in 2012, and both the European U16, World U16 Chess Championship in 2017 and Russian Chess Championship in 2026. He qualified for the Candidates Tournament 2026.

Together with 43 other Russian elite chess players, Esipenko signed an open letter to Russian president Vladimir Putin, protesting against the 2022 Russian invasion of Ukraine and expressing solidarity with the Ukrainian people.

== Chess career ==
=== Early career ===
Esipenko was born in Novocherkassk in Rostov Oblast to a Russian family. He started playing chess when he was five years old. Esipenko became European U10 Chess Champion in 2012. He earned his FIDE master title in 2013. He secured all of his grandmaster norms by late 2017 and was awarded the title by FIDE in April 2018.

From 30 May to 10 June 2017, he took part in the 2017 European Individual Chess Championship. He scored 6½/11 (+4–2=5). His performance rating was 2618. He won both the European U16 and World U16 Chess Championship in 2017.

He competed in the 2017 World Rapid Chess Championship in December, scoring 7½/15 for a performance rating of 2622. During the tournament he played a queen sacrifice against Sergey Karjakin, which Leonard Barden said may be "the move of the year". He scored 11½/21 in the World Blitz Chess Championship, placing 41st out of 138.

In February 2018, Esipenko participated in the Aeroflot Open. He finished fifty-seventh out of ninety-two, scoring 4/9 (+1–2=6). In March 2018, he competed in the European Individual Chess Championship. He placed forty-eighth, scoring 7/11 (+4–1=6).

=== 2019–2021 ===
Esipenko competed in the Tata Steel Challengers in January 2019, placing second with 8½/13 (+5–1=7). In March, he participated in the European Individual Chess Championship. He placed 16th with 7½/11 (+6–2=3) and qualified for the Chess World Cup 2019. At the Chess World Cup, Esipenko defeated former FIDE world champion Ruslan Ponomariov in round one. Paired against Peter Svidler in round two, Esipenko drew the classical games but was eliminated in the rapid tiebreaks.

In January 2020, Esipenko participated in the Gibraltar Masters. He was sole leader after six rounds with 5½/6, and ultimately shared first on 7½/10 for a performance rating of 2809. In a four-way playoff for the title, Esipenko was eliminated in the semi-finals by eventual tournament winner David Paravyan.

Esipenko competed in the Tata Steel Masters in January 2021. In round eight, he defeated World Champion Magnus Carlsen in their first game at a classical time control. Carlsen opted for the Sicilian Defence, Scheveningen Variation to which Esipenko chose the aggressive 8.g4 line inspired by the Keres Attack. This was Carlsen's first loss to a teenager (at standard time controls) since 2011, and his first loss to a sub-2700 rated player since 2015. Esipenko finished the tournament in third place, with 8/13 (+4–1=8) for a performance rating of 2815.

Esipenko participated in the Chess World Cup 2021. He defeated Thai Dai Van Nguyen, Nijat Abasov, and Daniil Dubov to reach the fifth round, where he was knocked out of the tournament by Magnus Carlsen on blitz tiebreaks.

Esipenko also participated in the 74th edition of the Russian Chess Championship, held from 9 October 2021 to 20 October 2021. He finished fifth place on tiebreaks, with a score of 5.5/11.

=== 2022–2024 ===
In 2022, Esipenko participated in the 2022 Airthings Masters. In the preliminary stage, he finished 4th with 24 points, thus qualifying for the quarterfinals where he beat Eric Hansen 3-1. He then proceeded to the semifinals, where Ian Nepomniachtchi defeated him by a score of 2.5-0.5.

Through February and March 2022, Esipenko played in the FIDE Grand Prix 2022. In the first leg, he placed second in Pool A with a 3.5/6 result. In the third leg, he finished last in Pool A with a result of 1.5/6, finishing 16th in the standings with four points.

In February 2023, Esipenko competed in the first edition of the WR Chess Masters in Düsseldorf, where he tied for 5th place with 5 other players, scoring 4/9 (+1–2=6).

In March 2023, Esipenko competed in the European Individual Chess Championship, where he placed 8th with a score of 8/11 (+5–0=6). This gave him a spot in the Chess World Cup 2023.

In December 2024, Esipenko won the Qatar Masters after drawing GM Arjun Erigaisi in the final round, finishing in sole first with a score of 7.5/9.

=== 2025–2026 ===
In November 2025, he participated in the FIDE World Cup 2025, where he advanced to semifinals after defeating Pouya Idani, Nijat Abasov, Aleksey Grebnev, Vincent Keymer, and Sam Shankland. He was defeated in the semifinal tiebreaks by Wei Yi, but advanced to the third place match, where he beat Nodirbek Yakubboev and thus qualified to the 2026 Candidates Tournament.

Esipenko participated in the Candidates Tournament 2026. He scored 4.5/14 (+0−5=9) and finished last in a field of eight players.

In October 2026, Esipenko won the 79th Russian Chess Championship with a round to spare, scoring 7.5/11 (+4–0=7).
