= Candidates Tournament 2022 =

Chess tournament in Madrid, Spain

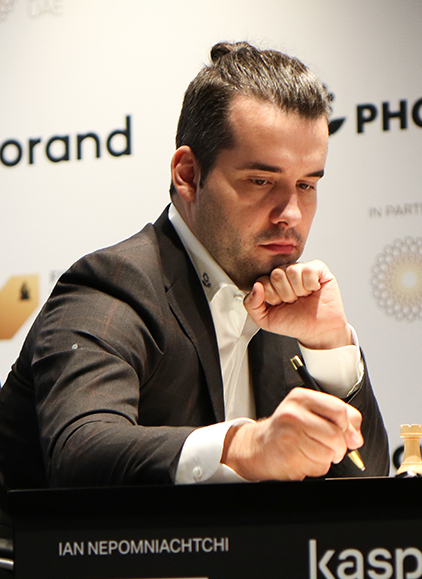
- Ian Nepomniachtchi, the winner of the tournament, advanced to the World Chess Championship 2023 match.
- Venue: Palacio de Santoña
- Location: Madrid, Spain
- Dates: 16 June – 5 July 2022
- Competitors: 8
- Winning score: 9.5 points of 14

Champion
- (FIDE) Ian Nepomniachtchi

The 2022 Candidates Tournament was an eight-player chess tournament to decide the challenger for the World Chess Championship 2023. The tournament took place at the Palacio de Santoña in Madrid, Spain, from 16 June to 5 July, 2022, with the World Championship finishing in April 2023. As with every Candidates tournament since 2013, it was a double round-robin tournament.

The eight qualifiers were Ian Nepomniachtchi, Teimour Radjabov, Jan-Krzysztof Duda, Alireza Firouzja, Fabiano Caruana, Hikaru Nakamura, Richárd Rapport, and Ding Liren. Sergey Karjakin was originally a qualifier, but was disqualified for breaching the FIDE Code of Ethics after publicly expressing approval of the Russian invasion of Ukraine. Karjakin was replaced by Ding, the highest-rated player who had not yet qualified.

Nepomniachtchi won the tournament undefeated with a round to spare and the highest score in any Candidates tournament since the modern format was introduced in 2013; this high score has since been surpassed in the 2026 Candidates Tournament by Javokhir Sindarov. This made him one of five players to win consecutive Candidates, the others being Vasily Smyslov, Boris Spassky, Viktor Korchnoi, and Anatoly Karpov. (Of these, only Smyslov and Nepomniachtchi achieved this when the Candidates were organised as a tournament, rather than a series of matches.) Ding ended up in second place, having pulled off a last-round victory against Nakamura who failed to hold the game to a draw that would have seen him finish in second place instead.

Nepomniachtchi was scheduled to play a match against Magnus Carlsen for the World Chess Championship. But after the tournament, Carlsen confirmed that he would not play, which he already had announced as likely after the World Chess Championship 2021. Instead Nepomniachtchi played Ding, the second-place finisher, for the world championship.

== Participants ==
The qualifiers for the Candidates Tournament were:

Qualification method	Player	Age	Rating	World ranking
Qualification method	Player	(June 2022)		
2021 World Championship runner-up	(FIDE) Ian Nepomniachtchi (Note: Russian players' flags were displayed as the FIDE flag, as Russian and Belarusian flags have been banned from FIDE-rated events in response to the Russian invasion of Ukraine.)	31	2766	7
Candidate nominated by FIDE	(Azerbaijan) Teimour Radjabov	35	2753	13
The top two finishers in the Chess World Cup 2021 (Note: The regulations stated that it would be the top two finishers other than Carlsen, Nepomniachtchi and Radjabov. (And that if all three finished in the top four of the World Cup, then the only World Cup qualifier would be the other player in the top four; and three qualifiers would come from the Grand Prix.) However, none of these players reached the World Cup final: Nepomniachtchi and Radjabov elected not to play, and Carlsen lost at the semi-final stage.)	(Poland) Jan-Krzysztof Duda (winner)	24	2750	16
The top two finishers in the Chess World Cup 2021	(FIDE) ~~Sergey Karjakin~~ (runner-up) (Disqualified)	32	2747	17
The top two finishers in the FIDE Grand Swiss Tournament 2021	(France) Alireza Firouzja (winner)	19	2793	3
The top two finishers in the FIDE Grand Swiss Tournament 2021	(United States) Fabiano Caruana (runner-up)	29	2783	4
The top two finishers in the FIDE Grand Prix 2022 (Note: The 2021 World Champion was not allowed to take part in the Grand Prix. Other players who had already qualified for the Candidates were required to give up their qualification spot if they took part in the Grand Prix. Thus, all participants in the Grand Prix had not yet qualified for the Candidates.)	(United States) Hikaru Nakamura (winner)	34	2760	11
The top two finishers in the FIDE Grand Prix 2022	(Hungary) Richárd Rapport (runner-up)	26	2764	8
Highest rating for May 2022	(China) Ding Liren (replacement for Karjakin)	29	2806	2

=== Qualification of Radjabov ===
Teimour Radjabov had qualified for the previous Candidates Tournament, which was scheduled to begin on 17 March 2020 in Russia. With the COVID-19 pandemic rapidly spreading around the world in early 2020, Radjabov privately asked FIDE to postpone the tournament. FIDE refused to do so, so Radjabov withdrew on 6 March 2020. The tournament began on time, but after one week of play (half the matches completed) FIDE suspended the tournament anyway, citing public health restrictions imposed by the Russian government due to the pandemic. With his concerns vindicated by the events, Radjabov called for his reinstatement into the 2020 tournament once it was rescheduled. FIDE again refused Radjabov's request, instead offering him a direct entry into the 2022 Candidates, which he accepted. The 2020 Candidates was not completed until April 2021.

=== Disqualification of Karjakin ===
Following the Russian invasion of Ukraine, Sergey Karjakin made numerous public statements praising the invasion, and shared Russian-government statements about the military action, which many commentators viewed as propaganda. In March 2022, the FIDE Ethics and Disciplinary Commission ruled that Karjakin had breached the FIDE Code of Ethics with his statements, so banned him from playing FIDE-related tournaments for a period of six months, including the 2022 Candidates Tournament.

Karjakin had 21 days to appeal, though he was unrepentant and said he did not see any point in doing so. Nevertheless, the Chess Federation of Russia filed an appeal on his behalf. On May 6, FIDE's Appeal Chamber upheld the decision. Karjakin had the option of a further appeal to the Court of Arbitration for Sport, but none was submitted before the Candidates Tournament started.

=== Qualification of Ding Liren ===
Originally, no player would have qualified solely by their rating. However, following the ban of Karjakin, the rules stated the replacement would be the highest rated player who had not already qualified, based on the May 2022 rating list, with a requirement of having played at least 30 officially rated games between June 2021 and May 2022.

In the April 2022 rating list, the highest rated player (who was not world champion or already qualified) was Ding Liren with a rating of 2799. However, Ding had only played 4 of the required 30 rated games due to his inability to travel to tournaments outside China during the COVID-19 pandemic. Ding therefore needed to play at least 26 rated games in March and April, which would be incorporated into the May 2022 rating list. He also needed to maintain his rating lead over the next highest non-qualifier – several other players could potentially have overtaken him, including Shakhriyar Mamedyarov and Levon Aronian. The Chinese Chess Association organized three different rated events at short notice, each involving Ding, thereby allowing him to meet the minimum games requirement. A strong performance in those events meant he also increased his rating, moving up to #2 in the rating list. Once Karjakin's appeal was denied, Ding officially qualified for the Candidates Tournament.

== Organization ==
The tournament was an eight-player, double round-robin tournament, meaning there were 14 rounds with each player facing the others twice: once with the black pieces and once with the white pieces. The tournament winner qualified to play Magnus Carlsen for the World Championship in 2023.

However, Carlsen said following the previous championship in 2021 that, due to a lack of motivation, he might not defend his title unless the challenger was Alireza Firouzja, who rose to number two in the world rankings in 2021 at the age of 18. In April 2022, he went further, saying that he is unlikely to play, with no mention of any potential opponent. After the tournament, FIDE gave a deadline of 20 July, 2022 for Carlsen to make a decision before retracting it later calling it a "misunderstanding". However, on 20 July, Magnus Carlsen stated that he was unwilling to play, meaning that the top two finishers of the candidates played for the world championship in 2023.

Players from the same federation were required to play each other in the first rounds of each half to avoid collusion. The players affected in the 2022 Candidates were Fabiano Caruana and Hikaru Nakamura from the US; they faced each other in rounds 1 and 8.

=== Regulations ===
The time control was 120 minutes for the first 40 moves, 60 minutes for the next 20 moves, and then 15 minutes for the rest of the game, plus a 30-second increment per move starting from move 61. Players got 1 point for a win, ½ point for a draw and 0 points for a loss.

While there was no tie for first place, such a situation would have been addressed as follows:

- Players would play two rapid chess games at 15 minutes plus 10 seconds per move. If a three- to six-way tie had occurred, a single round-robin would be played. If seven or eight players had been tied, a single round-robin would be played with a time limit of 10 minutes plus 5 seconds per move.
- If any players had still been tied for first after the rapid chess games, they would play two blitz chess games at 3 minutes plus 2 seconds per move. In the case of more than two players being tied, a single round-robin would be played.
- If any players were still tied for first after these blitz chess games, the remaining players would play a knock-out blitz tournament at the same time control. In each mini-match of the proposed knock-out tournament, the first player to win a game would win the mini-match.

This was a change from previous candidates tournaments from 2013 to 2021, which used tie-breaks based on players' results in the tournament (such as results of head-to-head games between tied players, and number of wins). Ties for places other than first were broken by, in order: (1) Sonneborn–Berger score; (2) total number of wins; (3) head-to-head score among tied players; (4) drawing of lots.

The prize money was €48,000 for first place, €36,000 for second place, and €24,000 for third place (with players on the same number of points sharing prize money, irrespective of tie-breaks), plus €3,500 per half-point for every player, for a total prize pool of €500,000.

During the 2022 Chess Candidates tournament, the players were uncertain if Magnus Carlsen would defend or forfeit his World Chess Champion title. As such, it was not clear if the tournament's runner-up would become the challenger for the 2023 World Chess Championship title match until the event was over.

== Results ==
=== Standings ===
As world champion Carlsen announced after the tournament that he would not defend the world title, both first and second place advanced to the 2023 title match.

Standings of the 2022 Candidates Tournament
Rank	Player	Score	SB	Wins	NEP		DIN		RAD		NAK		CAR		FIR		DUD		RAP	
1	Ian Nepomniachtchi (FIDE)	9.5 / 14	62	5			½	1	½	½	½	½	½	½	1	1	1	½	½	1
2	Ding Liren (CHN)	8 / 14	52	4	0	½			0	½	1	½	½	1	½	½	1	½	½	1
3	Teimour Radjabov (AZE)	7.5 / 14	52	3	½	½	½	1			1	0	½	0	½	½	½	½	½	1
4	Hikaru Nakamura (USA)	7.5 / 14	50.25	4	½	½	½	0	1	0			1	0	1	½	1	½	½	½
5	Fabiano Caruana (USA)	6.5 / 14	46.5	3	½	½	0	½	1	½	1	0			0	1	½	0	½	½
6	Alireza Firouzja (FRA)	6 / 14	39.5	2	0	0	½	½	½	½	½	0	0	1			½	½	1	½
7	Jan-Krzysztof Duda (POL)	5.5 / 14	38.5	1	½	0	½	0	½	½	½	0	1	½	½	½			½	0
8	Richárd Rapport (HUN)	5.5 / 14	37.75	1	0	½	0	½	0	½	½	½	½	½	½	0	1	½		

Tie-breakers for first place: (1) results in tie-break games for first place;

Tie breakers for non-first place: (1) results in tie-break games for first place, if any; (2) Sonneborn–Berger score (SB); (3) total number of wins; (4) head-to-head score among tied players; (5) drawing of lots.

Note: Numbers in the crosstable in a white background indicate the result playing the respective opponent with the white pieces (black pieces if on a black background). This does not give information which of the two games was played in the first half of the tournament, and which in the second.

=== Points by round ===
This table shows each player's cumulative difference between their number of wins and losses after each round. Green backgrounds indicate the player(s) with the highest score after each round. Magenta backgrounds indicate player(s) who could no longer win the tournament after each round, while red backgrounds indicate those who could no longer finish second either.

Rank	Player	Rounds													
Rank	Player	1	2	3	4	5	6	7	8	9	10	11	12	13	14
1	Ian Nepomniachtchi (FIDE)	+1	+1	+1	+2	+2	+3	+4	+4	+4	+4	+5	+5	+5	+5
2	Ding Liren (CHN)	–1	–1	–1	–1	–1	–1	–1	–1	=	+1	+2	+1	+1	+2
3	Teimour Radjabov (AZE)	=	–1	–1	–1	–1	–1	–2	–2	–1	–1	–1	=	=	+1
4	Hikaru Nakamura (USA)	–1	=	=	=	=	=	=	+1	=	+1	+1	+1	+2	+1
5	Fabiano Caruana (USA)	+1	+1	+1	+1	+1	+2	+3	+2	+2	+1	=	=	=	–1
6	Alireza Firouzja (FRA)	=	=	=	–1	–1	–2	–2	–2	–1	–2	–3	–3	–3	–2
7	Jan-Krzysztof Duda (POL)	=	=	=	=	=	–1	–1	–2	–3	–2	–2	–2	–3	–3
8	Richárd Rapport (HUN)	=	=	=	=	=	=	–1	=	–1	–2	–2	–2	–2	–3

=== Results by round ===
In April 2022, FIDE announced pairings for the tournament. Tie-breaks, if they had been required, would have been played on 5 July. Since Nepomniachtchi had a decisive result, no tie breaks were actually played.

First named player is white. 1–0 indicates a white win, 0–1 indicates a black win, and ½–½ indicates a draw. Numbers in parentheses show players' scores prior to the round. Final column indicates opening played, sourced from The Week in Chess.

Round 1 (17 June 2022)
Jan-Krzysztof Duda	½–½	Richárd Rapport	B44 Sicilian Taimanov
Ding Liren	0–1	Ian Nepomniachtchi	A20 English Opening
Fabiano Caruana	1–0	Hikaru Nakamura	C65 Ruy Lopez Berlin
Teimour Radjabov	½–½	Alireza Firouzja	D37 QGD Vienna
Round 2 (18 June 2022)
Richárd Rapport (½)	½–½	Alireza Firouzja (½)	B53 Sicilian Chekhover
Hikaru Nakamura (0)	1–0	Teimour Radjabov (½)	C65 Ruy Lopez Berlin
Ian Nepomniachtchi (1)	½–½	Fabiano Caruana (1)	C50 Giuoco Pianissimo
Jan-Krzysztof Duda (½)	½–½	Ding Liren (0)	C53 Giuoco Pianissimo
Round 3 (19 June 2022)
Ding Liren (½)	½–½	Richárd Rapport (1)	D86 Grünfeld Simagin
Fabiano Caruana (1½)	½–½	Jan-Krzysztof Duda (1)	B90 Sicilian Najdorf
Teimour Radjabov (½)	½–½	Ian Nepomniachtchi (1½)	E04 Catalan
Alireza Firouzja (1)	½–½	Hikaru Nakamura (1)	E32 Nimzo-Indian 4.Qc2
Round 4 (21 June 2022)
Richárd Rapport (1½)	½–½	Hikaru Nakamura (1½)	C65 Ruy Lopez Berlin
Ian Nepomniachtchi (2)	1–0	Alireza Firouzja (1½)	B90 Sicilian Najdorf
Jan-Krzysztof Duda (1½)	½–½	Teimour Radjabov (1)	C65 Ruy Lopez Berlin
Ding Liren (1)	½–½	Fabiano Caruana (2)	D38 QGD Ragozin
Round 5 (22 June 2022)
Fabiano Caruana (2½)	½–½	Richárd Rapport (2)	B46 Sicilian Taimanov
Teimour Radjabov (1½)	½–½	Ding Liren (1½)	E00 Catalan
Alireza Firouzja (1½)	½–½	Jan-Krzysztof Duda (2)	C42 Petrov's Defence
Hikaru Nakamura (2)	½–½	Ian Nepomniachtchi (3)	C42 Petrov's Defence
Round 6 (23 June 2022)
Teimour Radjabov (2)	½–½	Richárd Rapport (2½)	B46 Sicilian Taimanov
Alireza Firouzja (2)	0–1	Fabiano Caruana (3)	E06 Catalan
Hikaru Nakamura (2½)	½–½	Ding Liren (2)	С53 Giuoco Pianissimo
Ian Nepomniachtchi (3½)	1–0	Jan-Krzysztof Duda (2½)	A07 King's Indian Attack
Round 7 (25 June 2022)
Richárd Rapport (3)	0–1	Ian Nepomniachtchi (4½)	C42 Petrov's Defence
Jan-Krzysztof Duda (2½)	½–½	Hikaru Nakamura (3)	E47 Nimzo-Indian
Ding Liren (2½)	½–½	Alireza Firouzja (2)	A20 English Opening
Fabiano Caruana (4)	1–0	Teimour Radjabov (2½)	B32 Sicilian O'Kelly
Round 8 (26 June 2022)
Richárd Rapport (3)	1–0	Jan-Krzysztof Duda (3)	C47 Four Knights Game 4.g3
Ian Nepomniachtchi (5½)	½–½	Ding Liren (3)	C47 Scotch Four Knights Game
Hikaru Nakamura (3½)	1–0	Fabiano Caruana (5)	C82 Ruy Lopez Open
Alireza Firouzja (2½)	½–½	Teimour Radjabov (2½)	C50 Giuoco Pianissimo
Round 9 (27 June 2022)
Alireza Firouzja (3)	1–0	Richárd Rapport (4)	C65 Ruy Lopez Berlin
Teimour Radjabov (3)	1–0	Hikaru Nakamura (4½)	C65 Ruy Lopez Berlin
Fabiano Caruana (5)	½–½	Ian Nepomniachtchi (6)	C42 Petrov's Defence
Ding Liren (3½)	1–0	Jan-Krzysztof Duda (3)	A13 English Opening, Neo-Catalan
Round 10 (29 June 2022)
Richárd Rapport (4)	0–1	Ding Liren (4½)	C77 Ruy Lopez Anderssen
Jan-Krzysztof Duda (3)	1–0	Fabiano Caruana (5½)	C53 Giuoco Pianissimo
Ian Nepomniachtchi (6½)	½–½	Teimour Radjabov (4)	E06 Catalan
Hikaru Nakamura (4½)	1–0	Alireza Firouzja (4)	B90 Sicilian Najdorf
Round 11 (30 June 2022)			
Hikaru Nakamura (5½)	½–½	Richárd Rapport (4)	B33 Sicilian Sveshnikov
Alireza Firouzja (4)	0–1	Ian Nepomniachtchi (7)	C42 Petrov's Defence
Teimour Radjabov (4½)	½–½	Jan-Krzysztof Duda (4)	A13 English Opening
Fabiano Caruana (5½)	0–1	Ding Liren (5½)	C88 Ruy Lopez Anti-Marshall
Round 12 (1 July 2022)
Richárd Rapport (4½)	½–½	Fabiano Caruana (5½)	C65 Ruy Lopez Berlin
Ding Liren (6½)	0–1	Teimour Radjabov (5)	E48 Nimzo-Indian Defence
Jan-Krzysztof Duda (4½)	½–½	Alireza Firouzja (4)	D45 Semi-Slav Defense
Ian Nepomniachtchi (8)	½–½	Hikaru Nakamura (6)	C67 Ruy Lopez Berlin
Round 13 (3 July 2022)
Ian Nepomniachtchi (8½)	½–½	Richárd Rapport (5)	B67 Sicilian Richter-Rauzer
Hikaru Nakamura (6½)	1–0	Jan-Krzysztof Duda (5)	B90 Sicilian Najdorf
Alireza Firouzja (4½)	½–½	Ding Liren (6½)	C47 Scotch Four Knights Game
Teimour Radjabov (6)	½–½	Fabiano Caruana (6)	E04 Catalan
Round 14 (4 July 2022)
Richárd Rapport (5½)	0–1	Teimour Radjabov (6½)	C65 Ruy Lopez Berlin
Fabiano Caruana (6½)	0–1	Alireza Firouzja (5)	C65 Ruy Lopez Berlin
Ding Liren (7)	1–0	Hikaru Nakamura (7½)	D40 Symmetrical Semi-Tarrasch
Jan-Krzysztof Duda (5)	½–½	Ian Nepomniachtchi (9)	C43 Petrov's Defence

== See also ==
- Women's Candidates Tournament 2022–23
