= Ian Nepomniachtchi =

Russian chess grandmaster (born 1990)

- Nepomniachtchi in 2026

Personal information
- Born: Ian Alexandrovich Nepomniachtchi; 14 July 1990 (age 36) Bryansk, Russian SFSR, Soviet Union
- Education: Russian State Social University

Chess career
- Country: Russia (Note: Nepomniachtchi currently plays under the FIDE flag because FIDE banned the display of Russian flags on 27 February 2022 in response to the Russian invasion of Ukraine.)
- Title: Grandmaster (2007)
- FIDE rating: 2719 (October 2026)
- Peak rating: 2795 (March 2023)
- Ranking: No. 21 (October 2026)
- Peak ranking: No. 2 (February 2023)

Ian Alexandrovich Nepomniachtchi (Note: Russian: Ян Алекса́ндрович Непо́мнящий, romanized: Yan Aleksandrovich Nepomnyashchiy, IPA: [ˈjan ɐlʲɪkˈsandrəvʲɪtɕ nʲɪˈpomnʲɪɕːɪj]) (born 14 July 1990) is a Russian chess grandmaster. Nepomniachtchi is a 2024 World Blitz Chess co-champion, alongside Magnus Carlsen. He is also a two-time Russian chess champion. He is one of very few players in history to have won two consecutive Candidates Tournaments. He is currently Russia's highest ranked active chess player.

Nepomniachtchi won the 2010 and 2020 Russian Superfinal and the 2010 European Individual titles. He also won the 2016 Tal Memorial and the 2008, 2015, 2025 and 2026 Aeroflot Open events. He won the World Team Chess Championship as a member of the Russian team in Antalya (2013) and Astana (2019). Nepomniachtchi won the 2015 European Team Chess Championship in Reykjavík with the Russian team. In October 2016, Nepomniachtchi was ranked fourth in the world in both rapid chess and blitz chess. He has won five individual medals (three silver, two bronze) at the World Rapid Championships and a silver medal at the 2014 World Blitz Championship, before winning the 2024 World Blitz Championship joint with Magnus Carlsen when the score in the final was tied at 3.5 points after 7 games. In October 2022, he won a silver medal in FIDE World Fischer Random Chess Championship 2022.

In December 2019, he qualified for the Candidates Tournament 2020–2021 by finishing second in the FIDE Grand Prix 2019. He won the 2021 FIDE Candidates tournament with a round to spare, which qualified him as the challenger in the World Chess Championship 2021 for the world championship title but lost his challenge to defending champion Magnus Carlsen. In July 2022, he won the 2022 FIDE Candidates tournament with a round to spare, thereby winning two Candidates tournaments in a row and again qualifying him to play in the World Chess Championship 2023; additionally, he garnered the then-highest score in any Candidates tournament since the modern format was introduced in 2013. However, he once again lost his challenge for the World Chess Championship title after losing to Ding Liren in 2023 during the 4th game of tiebreaks.

== Career ==
=== Early career ===
Nepomniachtchi learned to play chess at age four. His grandfather Boris Iosifovich Nepomniashchy (1929–1998) was a famous teacher and lyricist in Bryansk. Nepomniachtchi's first coaches were his uncle Igor Nepomniashchy, Valentin Evdokimenko, international master Valery Zilberstein, and grandmaster Sergei Yanovsky. At age five, Nepomniachtchi moved to Bryansk with his first coach, Valentin Evdokimenko, and trained until Nepomniachtchi was 13. Under the guidance of his coach, he took part in the World and European Championships. Nepomniachtchi won the European Youth Chess Championship three times. In 2000, he won the under-10 category, and in 2001 and 2002, he came first in the U12 championship. In 2002, Nepomniachtchi also won the World Youth Chess Championship in the U12 category, edging out Magnus Carlsen on tiebreak score.

=== 2007–2009 ===
In 2007, he finished second in the C group of the Corus Chess Tournament in Wijk aan Zee earning his first grandmaster (GM) norm. Later that year, Nepomniachtchi gained his second GM norm at the European Individual Chess Championship in Dresden. The third and final norm required for the GM title was won at the 5th Vanya Somov Memorial – World's Youth Stars tournament in Kirishi. Nepomniachtchi won the latter event, edging out Rauf Mamedov, Parimarjan Negi and Zaven Andriasian on tiebreak score.

By winning the Aeroflot Open in Moscow in February 2008, he qualified for the 2008 Dortmund Sparkassen Chess Meeting. In this tournament, he shared second place after an undefeated run. In the same year, he also won the Ordix Open, a rapid chess tournament in Mainz.

He won the gold medal in chess at the 2009 Maccabiah Games.

=== 2010–2011 ===
In 2010, in Rijeka, Nepomniachtchi won the European Individual Championship with a score of 9/11. Later the same year, in Moscow, he won the Russian Chess Championship, after defeating Sergey Karjakin in a playoff.

At the Chess World Cup 2011, Nepomniachtchi defeated Isan Reynaldo Ortiz Suárez in the first round and Alexander Riazantsev in the second round in tiebreaks, but he lost to Gata Kamsky in the third round in tiebreaks.

In November 2011, Nepomniachtchi tied for 3rd–5th with Vasily Ivanchuk and Sergey Karjakin in the category 22 Tal Memorial in Moscow.

Nepomniachtchi's coach in 2011 was Vladimir Potkin.

=== 2013–2015 ===
In May 2013, Nepomniachtchi tied for 1st–8th with Alexander Moiseenko, Evgeny Romanov, Alexander Beliavsky, Constantin Lupulescu, Francisco Vallejo Pons, Sergei Movsesian, Hrant Melkumyan, Alexey Dreev, and Evgeny Alekseev in the European Individual Championship. The following month, Nepomniachtchi finished second to Shakhriyar Mamedyarov in the World Rapid Chess Championship, held in Khanty-Mansiysk.

In August 2013, Nepomniachtchi participated in the Chess World Cup 2013. He was defeated by Wei Yi in the first round.

In October 2013, he tied for first with Peter Svidler in the Russian Championship Superfinal, finishing second on tiebreak.

Over the course of 2013, Nepomniachtchi's blitz rating surged from 2689 in January to 2830 in December.

Nepomniachtchi won the silver medal at the World Blitz Chess Championship of 2014 held in Dubai. In August, at the 5th International Chess Festival "Yaroslav the Wise" in Yaroslavl, he won the Tournament of Champions, a rapid chess event held with the double round-robin format featuring the six European champions of 2009–2014. At the SportAccord World Mind Games, held in December 2014 in Beijing, he won the gold medal in the men's Basque chess tournament.

In April 2015, he won the Aeroflot Open for the second time in his career, edging out Daniil Dubov on tiebreak, having played more games with the black pieces, and earned a spot in the 2015 Dortmund Sparkassen Chess Meeting. Right after the end of the tournament he also won the Aeroflot blitz tournament. Later that year, in September, he won the Moscow Blitz Championship and one month later, he took the silver medal at the World Rapid Chess Championship in Berlin.

At the Chess World Cup 2015, Nepomniachtchi defeated Zhao Jun and Laurent Fressinet in the first and second rounds, but lost to Hikaru Nakamura in the third round in tiebreaks.

=== 2016–2020 ===
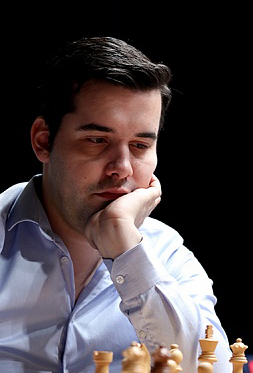
Nepomniachtchi at the 2018 Russian Chess Championships Super Finals

Nepomniachtchi won the 7th Hainan Danzhou tournament in July and the Tal Memorial in October.

At the 42nd Chess Olympiad, held in 2016, he won the team bronze medal and an individual silver playing board 4 for Russia.

At the Chess World Cup 2017, Nepomniachtchi defeated Mladen Palac and Baskaran Adhiban in the first and second rounds, but lost to Baadur Jobava in tiebreaks.

On 10 December 2017, Ian won a chess game against world champion Magnus Carlsen at the super tournament in London. In the tournament, Nepomniachtchi, the leader after eight rounds (+3−0=5), lost in a tie-break to Fabiano Caruana, who managed to catch up with the leader in the ninth round, and took 2nd place. On 27 December 2017, he took third in the World Rapid Chess Championship, which ended in Riyadh.

In July 2018, he won the 46th Dortmund Sparkassen Chess Meeting, scoring 5/7 (+3–0=4) to finish a point ahead of his nearest competitors.

In January 2019, Nepomniachtchi competed in the 81st Tata Steel Masters, placing third with 7½/13 (+4–2=7).

In March 2019, Nepomniachtchi contributed to Russia's World Team Chess Championship.

At the Chess World Cup 2019, Nepomniachtchi advanced past the third round for the first time. He was defeated by Yu Yangyi in the fourth round.

Over the course of 2019, he participated in the FIDE Grand Prix series, which was part of the qualification cycle for the 2020 World Chess Championship. In the series, Nepomniachtchi won two out of three tournaments in which he played. He finished second in the overall standings of the series, qualifying him for the 2020 Candidates Tournament.

In December 2020, he won the Russian championship with 7½ points out of 11 matches, edging out GM Sergey Karjakin by half a point.

=== 2021 ===
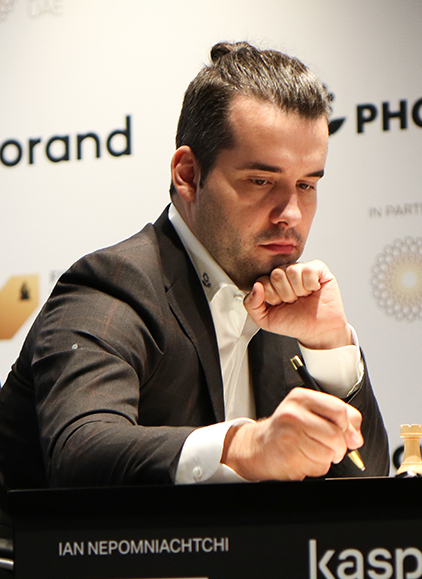
Nepomniachtchi at the 2021 World Chess Championship

In April 2021, Nepomniachtchi won the 2020/2021 Candidates tournament with 8½/14 points (+5-2=7) half a point above second place Maxime Vachier-Lagrave. The Candidates win qualified Nepomniachtchi to challenge Magnus Carlsen in a match for the World Chess Championship in November–December 2021. Carlsen retained his title, winning 7½–3½.

World Chess Championship 2021
	Rating	Rank	Match games														Points
	Rating	Rank	1	2	3	4	5	6	7	8	9	10	11	12	13	14	Points
Magnus Carlsen (NOR)	2856	1	½	½	½	½	½	1	½	1	1	½	1	Not required			7½
Ian Nepomniachtchi (CFR)	2782	5	½	½	½	½	½	0	½	0	0	½	0	Not required			3½

In August 2021 Nepomniachtchi was Russia's highest-ranked chess player, with a rating of 2792. This placed him fourth in the world and second in Europe (after Magnus Carlsen).

From 26 to 28 December 2021, Nepomniachtchi participated in the 2021 FIDE World Rapid Championship, where he ended as one of the joint leaders with 9½/13 points, and scored second place after tiebreaks. As a result, he qualified for a playoff against Nodirbek Abdusattorov, who also had 9½/13 points and scored first place after tiebreaks. Nepomniachtchi held Abdusattorov to a draw in their first playoff game, but lost in the second. As a result, he ended in second place.

In December 2021, Nepomniachtchi played a friendly game with Nornickel president Vladimir Potanin, which ended with victory for the grandmaster in the 38th move.

=== 2022 ===
Nepomniachtchi qualified for the 2022 Candidates tournament as the World Championship runner-up, and took an early lead in the tournament. He competed under the FIDE flag, following FIDE's suspension of the Russian and Belarusian teams from international competition. In round 13, Nepomniachtchi clinched a victory in the Candidates after securing a draw against Richárd Rapport, going into the 14th and final round with a lead of 1½ points. This guaranteed him qualification for the World Chess Championship 2023. He is the first player to win the Candidates tournament undefeated since Viswanathan Anand in 2014; additionally, he got the highest score of 9½/14 in any Candidates tournament since the modern format was introduced in 2013. Nepomniachtchi participated in the World Rapid Chess Championship 2022 and World Blitz Chess Championship 2022 but did not finish in the top three spots of these Championships.

=== 2023 ===
World Chess Championship 2023
	Rating	Classical games														Points	Rapid games				Total
	Rating	1	2	3	4	5	6	7	8	9	10	11	12	13	14	Points	15	16	17	18	Total
Ian Nepomniachtchi (FIDE)	2795	½	1	½	0	1	0	1	½	½	½	½	0	½	½	7	½	½	½	0	8½
Ding Liren (CHN)	2788	½	0	½	1	0	1	0	½	½	½	½	1	½	½	7	½	½	½	1	9½

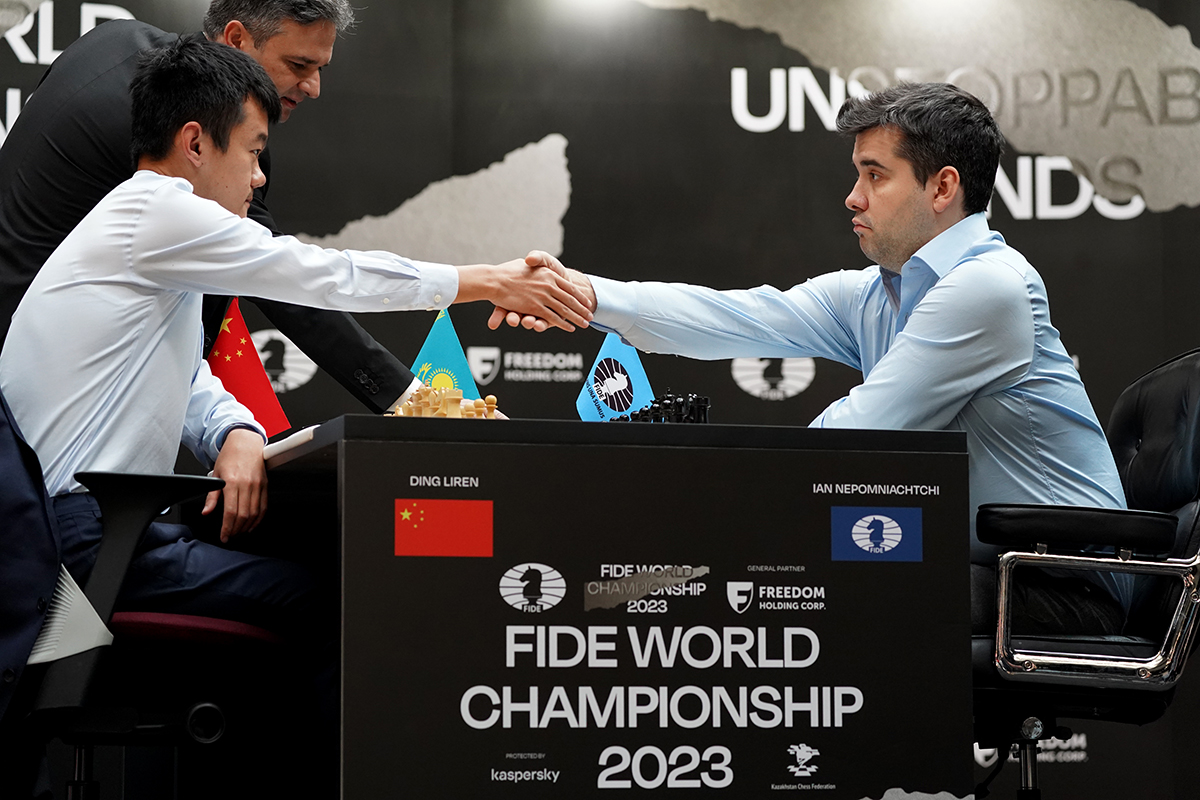
Nepomniachtchi (right) during the tiebreaks of the 2023 World Chess Championship

Nepomniachtchi reached his peak rating of 2795, ranked 17th highest peak rating attained ever, in March 2023. During the World Chess Championship 2023, Nepomniachtchi had a tied score of 7–7 with Ding Liren in the classical portion of the match. He ended up losing to Ding 9½–8½ in the 4th tiebreaker playoff as white in the rapid portion of the 18-game championship.

In May 2023, Nepomniachtchi participated in the Superbet Chess Classic 2023, finishing in 9th place, after losing to Fabiano Caruana, Alireza Firouzja, and Maxime Vachier-Lagrave.

At the Chess World Cup 2023, Nepomniachtchi advanced to the fifth round, where he was defeated by Vidit Gujrathi in tiebreaks.

He won the 2nd Levitov Chess Week, in September with a score of 12.5 points.

During round 11 of the World Blitz Chess Championship 2023, controversy arose after Nepomniachtchi faced off against fellow compatriot Daniil Dubov, with both players agreeing to a 13-move draw after playing a series of knight moves. After an investigation by FIDE, the chief arbiter penalized both Nepomniachtchi and Dubov on the basis that they had prearranged the draw, ruling the game with a 0–0 result. Both players appealed the verdict, but it was rejected by FIDE. Nepomniachtchi later apologized for the incident in a video uploaded to his YouTube channel. Nepomniachtchi also participated in the World Rapid Chess Championship 2023, but did not finish in one of the top 3 spots in the tournament.

=== 2024 ===
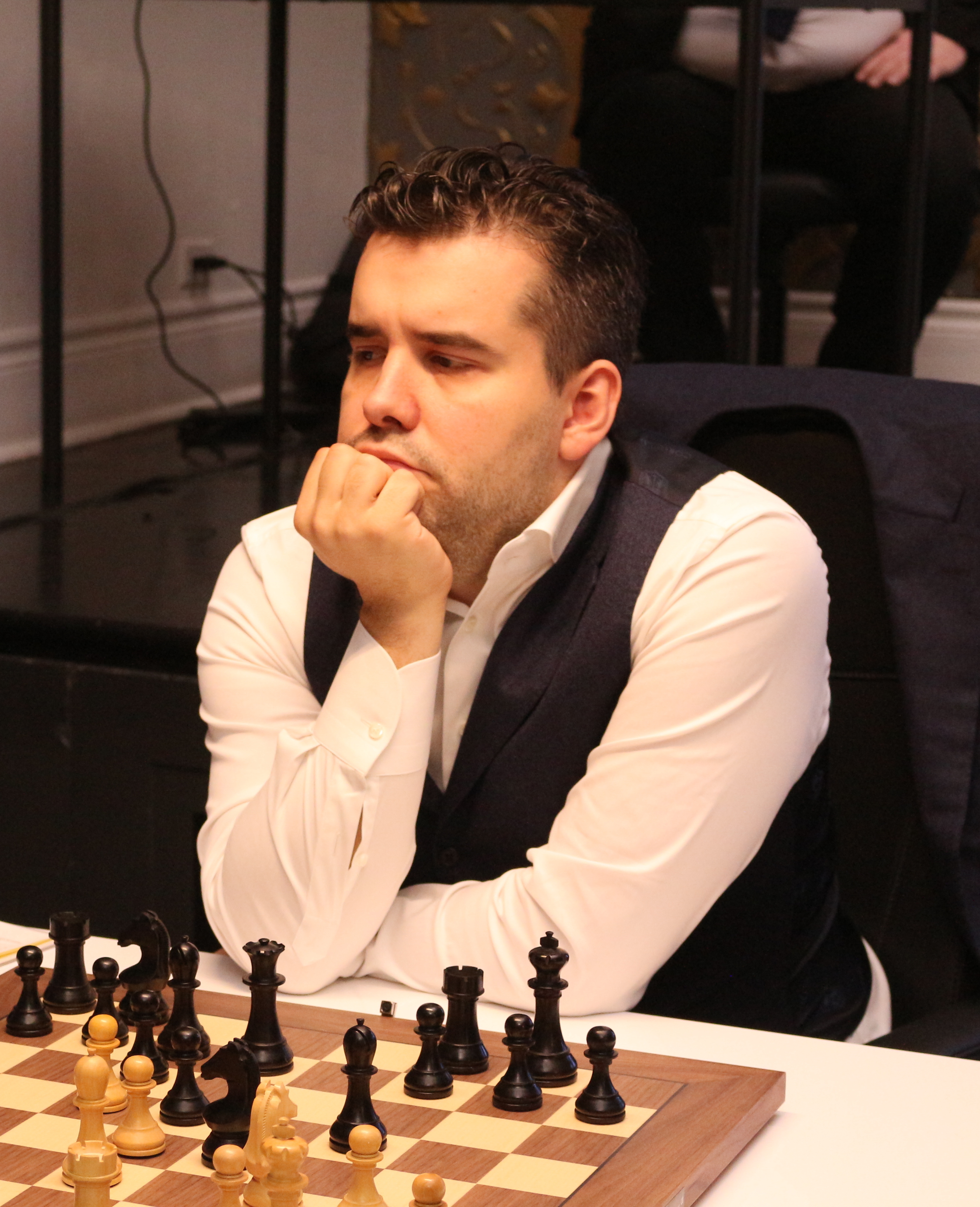
Nepomniachtchi during the 2024 Candidates Tournament

In January, he played in the 86th edition of Tata Steel Chess Tournament. He placed 8th out of 14 players, with a score of 6.5 points.

As the losing finalist of the World Chess Championship 2023, Nepomniachtchi was awarded direct entry into the 2024 Candidates Tournament. He led or tied for the lead for most of the tournament, but was overtaken by eventual winner Gukesh D in round 13. Nepomniachtchi was the only player not to lose a game in the tournament.

Nepomniachtchi participated in the Superbet Romania Chess Classic 2024 in June, finishing on a score of 50%.

In August, he played in the annual Sinquefield Cup 2024. He played poorly, finishing in 9th position.

In September, Nepomniachtchi won the 10th edition of the Gashimov Memorial.

In December, he played in the Champions Chess tour, finishing in second place after losing in the finals to Magnus Carlsen.

In December he won a bronze medal at the World Rapid Championship held in New York. Later that month, Nepomniachtchi was crowned the joint winner of the World Blitz Championship alongside Magnus Carlsen when the pair controversially agreed to share the title after three tiebreak matches in the final ended in draws.

=== 2025–2026 ===
In 2025, he played in 2nd UzChess Cup, placing ninth with 3½/9(+0-2=7).

At the FIDE Grand Swiss Tournament 2025, Nepomiachtchi 42nd with a score of 6/11.

At the Chess World Cup 2025, Nepomiachtchi lost to Diptayan Ghosh in the second round. Ultimately, he failed to qualify for the Candidates Tournament 2026.

In December, he won the 11th edition of the Gashimov Memorial.

Nepomniachtchi finished first in the Aeroflot Open 2026.

In June, he played in the 3rd UzChess Cup, placing third with 5/9(+3-2=4).

== Rapid and blitz rankings ==
In addition to his strength in classical time controls, Nepomniachtchi is very skilled at rapid and blitz chess. As of July 2026, Nepomniachtchi ranked sixth on the FIDE rapid list and eighth on the blitz list.

== Personal life ==
Nepomniachtchi is Jewish. He is often referred to by the nickname "Nepo". He graduated from the Russian State Social University.

On 4 October 2021, Nepomniachtchi appeared on the TV intellectual show What? Where? When?

=== Esports ===
In 2006, he was introduced to the video game Defense of the Ancients (Dota), later becoming a semi-professional Dota 2 player. He was a member of the team that won the ASUS Cup Winter 2011 Dota tournament, and also served as a commentator at the ESL One Hamburg 2018 Dota 2 tournament, using the nickname FrostNova. He also plays Hearthstone and introduced fellow Russian chess grandmaster Peter Svidler to the game. The two later provided feedback to the Hearthstone game developers.

=== Political views ===
Together with 43 other Russian elite chess players, Nepomniachtchi signed an open letter to Russian president Vladimir Putin in March 2022, protesting against the Russian invasion of Ukraine and expressing solidarity with the Ukrainian people.

== Books ==
- Grandmaster Zenon Franco (2021). Nail It Like Nepo!: Ian Nepomniachtchi's 30 Best Wins. [Limited Liability Company Elk and Ruby Publishing House]. ISBN 978-5604-56073-0.
- Grandmaster Dorian Rogozenco (2021). Eight Good Men: The 2020–2021 Candidates Tournament. [Limited Liability Company Elk and Ruby Publishing House]. ISBN 978-5604-17707-5.
- Cyrus Lakdawala (2021). Nepomniachtchi: Move by Move. [Everyman Chess]. ISBN 9781781946251.

== See also ==
- List of Jewish chess players
- List of Russian chess players

== Notes ==
Preceded by Alexander Grischuk	Russian Chess Champion; 2010	Succeeded by Peter Svidler
Preceded by Evgeny Tomashevsky	European Chess Champion; 2010	Succeeded by Vladimir Potkin
