= Palacio de Santoña =

Palace of Santoña
- Palacio de Santoña (Spanish)
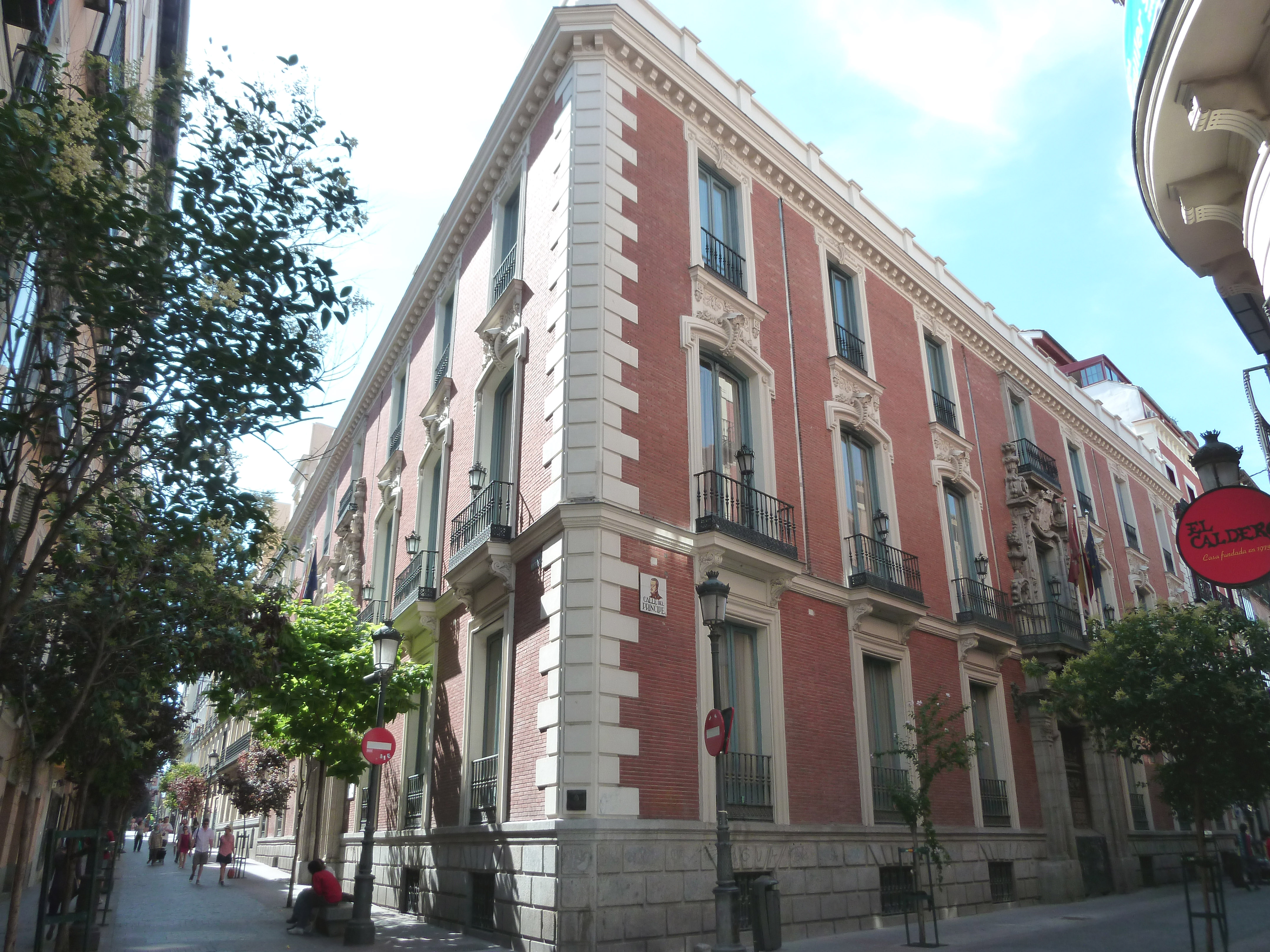

- Location within Spain
- 40.414019°N 3.700365°W
- Location: Madrid, Spain

Spanish Cultural Heritage
- Official name: Palacio de Santoña
- Type: Non-movable
- Criteria: Monument
- Designated: 1995
- Reference no.: RI-51-0009081

The Palacio de Santoña (English: Palace of Santoña) is a palace located in Madrid, Spain, originally constructed for the Duke of Santoña. It was declared Bien de Interés Cultural in 1995. It is a sixteenth-century building, renovated in the eighteenth century by the architect Pedro de Ribera, and in the nineteenth century by Antonio Ruiz de Salces.

The Candidates Tournament 2022 in chess was held at the Palacio from June–July 2022.
