= World Chess Championship 2023 =

Chess match between Ian Nepomniachtchi and Ding Liren

- St Regis Hotel, Astana, Kazakhstan
- 9–30 April 2023
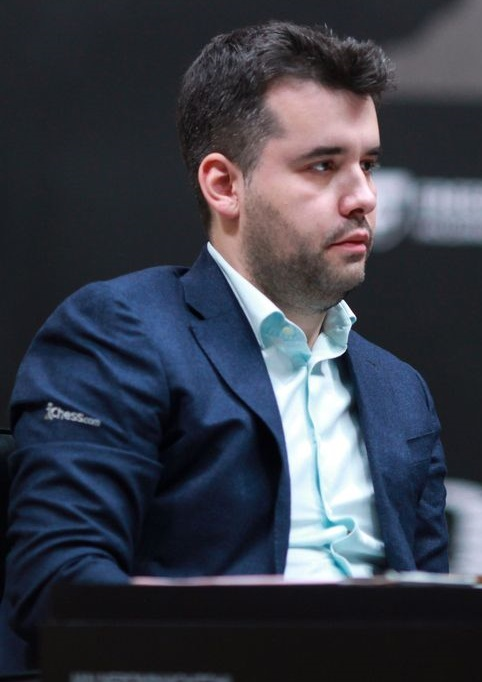
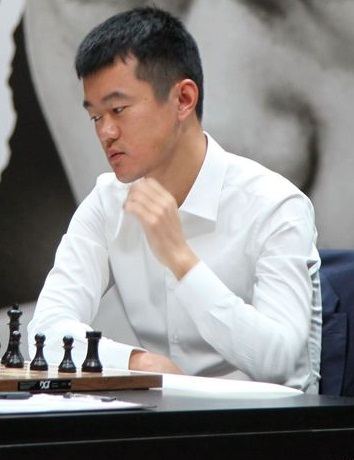
	(FIDE) Ian Nepomniachtchi	(China) Ding Liren
7 (1½)	Scores	7 (2½)
	Born 14 July 1990; 32 years old	Born 24 October 1992; 30 years old
	Winner of the Candidates Tournament 2022	Runner-up of the Candidates Tournament 2022
	Rating: 2795 (World No. 2)	Rating: 2788 (World No. 3)

The World Chess Championship 2023 was a chess match between Ian Nepomniachtchi and Ding Liren to determine the new World Chess Champion, held under the auspices of FIDE. The match took place in Astana, Kazakhstan, from 9 April to 30 April 2023, and was a best of 14 games, with rapid tiebreaks played if necessary. The previous champion Magnus Carlsen decided not to defend his title against Nepomniachtchi, the winner of the Candidates Tournament 2022, citing a lack of motivation. As a result, Nepomniachtchi faced Ding, the runner-up of the Candidates.

Nepomniachtchi took the lead three times during the match, winning games 2, 5, and 7. However, Ding evened the score each time, winning games 4, 6, and 12. Both players missed several opportunities, with Nepomniachtchi having a decisive advantage in games 12 and 14, and Ding in game 8. After a 7–7 tie in the classical games, the match proceeded to rapid tiebreaks. After draws in the first three games, Ding boldly declined a draw by repetition in the final rapid game, and won with black to become the 17th World Champion.

Commentators praised the match for its excitement, high number of decisive games, and the fighting spirit of both players, but also criticized the quality of play and large amount of blunders. Ding's path to becoming World Champion was also seen as remarkable, as he had neither qualified for nor won the Candidates.

== Carlsen refuses to defend the title ==
The previous World Champion was Magnus Carlsen, who first won the title in 2013. To keep the title, Carlsen was periodically required to defend it in a championship match against a challenger, determined by a Candidates Tournament. Carlsen successfully defended the title in the world championship matches of 2014, 2016, 2018, and 2021. In December 2021, soon after the 2021 championship (against Ian Nepomniachtchi), Carlsen stated that he lacked the motivation to defend his title again, unless the challenger was Alireza Firouzja. Firouzja had risen to number two in the world rankings in 2021 at age 18. In April 2022, Carlsen again publicly stated that he was unlikely to play in the next world championship, this time without mentioning any potential opponent.

The Candidates Tournament 2022 concluded in early July 2022, with Nepomniachtchi its winner. FIDE and Carlsen were already in talks regarding the world championship match and its format. On 20 July, Carlsen announced that he would not defend his title. Therefore, the 2023 world championship match was between Nepomniachtchi and Ding Liren, the winner and runner-up of the 2022 Candidates Tournament, respectively, and Carlsen lost the title when the match concluded. After Carlsen formally confirmed his decision in writing, FIDE officially invited Ding to participate in the 2023 world championship.

=== History of non-participation ===
Non-participation by the incumbent champion in the World Chess Championship is rare. The only two previous times in chess history where an undisputed world championship was played without the defending champion were in 1948 and 1975. The World Chess Championship 1948 was a five-player tournament held without the previous champion Alexander Alekhine, who had died in 1946. In 1975, incumbent champion Bobby Fischer declined to take part because of dissatisfaction with the format – the World Championship match was first-to-12.5-points, while Fischer wanted a first-to-ten-wins format. After FIDE declined to meet Fischer's demands, Fischer forfeited, and FIDE awarded the title to Fischer's challenger, Anatoly Karpov, the winner of the Candidates Final. No Championship match was held.

Non-participation by the incumbent champion in disputed World Chess Championships from 1993 to 2005 was more common. For the World Chess Championship 1993, incumbent Garry Kasparov and his challenger Nigel Short broke with FIDE and organized the championship on their own terms. FIDE disqualified them and set up its own FIDE World Chess Championship 1993 with runners-up Jan Timman and Anatoly Karpov. This set up the 13-year period of split World Champion title 1993–2006. In the sub-period of 1999–2004, the FIDE Championship was held as a knockout tournament with 100–128 candidates: here Karpov refused to participate in 1999 due to the lack of privileges for him as incumbent champion, and 2002 FIDE champion Ruslan Ponomariov refused to defend his title in 2004 to protest against the preponderant role FIDE granted Kasparov in the re-unification process.

== Candidates Tournament 2022 ==
The challengers were Ian Nepomniachtchi and Ding Liren, who qualified as the winner and runner-up, respectively, in the Candidates Tournament 2022 in Madrid, Spain, which began on June 16 and ended on July 5, 2022. Ding qualified for the Candidates Tournament 2022 through his rating, as a replacement for Sergey Karjakin, who had been barred from playing by FIDE due to his comments supporting the Russian invasion of Ukraine. Nepomniachtchi had challenged world champion Carlsen in the previous championship in 2021.

The participants were:

Qualification method	Player	Age	Rating	World ranking
Qualification method	Player	(June 2022)		
2021 World Championship runner-up	(FIDE) Ian Nepomniachtchi (Note: Russian players' flags were displayed as the FIDE flag, as Russian and Belarusian flags are banned from FIDE-rated events in response to the Russian invasion of Ukraine.)	31	2766	7
Candidate nominated by FIDE	(Azerbaijan) Teimour Radjabov	35	2753	13
The top two finishers in the Chess World Cup 2021	(Poland) Jan-Krzysztof Duda (winner)	24	2750	16
The top two finishers in the Chess World Cup 2021	(FIDE) ~~Sergey Karjakin~~ (runner-up) (Disqualified)	32	2747	17
The top two finishers in the FIDE Grand Swiss Tournament 2021	(France) Alireza Firouzja (winner)	19	2793	3
The top two finishers in the FIDE Grand Swiss Tournament 2021	(United States) Fabiano Caruana (runner-up)	29	2783	4
The top two finishers in the FIDE Grand Prix 2022	(United States) Hikaru Nakamura (winner)	34	2760	11
The top two finishers in the FIDE Grand Prix 2022	(Hungary) Richárd Rapport (runner-up)	26	2764	8
Highest rating for May 2022	(China) Ding Liren (replacement for Karjakin)	29	2806	2

=== Results ===
As world champion Carlsen announced after the tournament that he would not defend the world title, both first and second place advanced to the 2023 title match.

Standings of the 2022 Candidates Tournament
Rank	Player	Score	SB	Wins	NEP		DIN		RAD		NAK		CAR		FIR		DUD		RAP	
1	Ian Nepomniachtchi (FIDE)	9.5 / 14	62	5			½	1	½	½	½	½	½	½	1	1	1	½	½	1
2	Ding Liren (CHN)	8 / 14	52	4	0	½			0	½	1	½	½	1	½	½	1	½	½	1
3	Teimour Radjabov (AZE)	7.5 / 14	52	3	½	½	½	1			1	0	½	0	½	½	½	½	½	1
4	Hikaru Nakamura (USA)	7.5 / 14	50.25	4	½	½	½	0	1	0			1	0	1	½	1	½	½	½
5	Fabiano Caruana (USA)	6.5 / 14	46.5	3	½	½	0	½	1	½	1	0			0	1	½	0	½	½
6	Alireza Firouzja (FRA)	6 / 14	39.5	2	0	0	½	½	½	½	½	0	0	1			½	½	1	½
7	Jan-Krzysztof Duda (POL)	5.5 / 14	38.5	1	½	0	½	0	½	½	½	0	1	½	½	½			½	0
8	Richárd Rapport (HUN)	5.5 / 14	37.75	1	0	½	0	½	0	½	½	½	½	½	½	0	1	½		

Tie-breakers for first place: (1) results in tie-break games for first place;

Tie breakers for non-first place: (1) results in tie-break games for first place, if any; (2) Sonneborn–Berger score (SB); (3) total number of wins; (4) head-to-head score among tied players; (5) drawing of lots.

Note: Numbers in the crosstable in a white background indicate the result playing the respective opponent with the white pieces (black pieces if on a black background). This does not give information which of the two games was played in the first half of the tournament, and which in the second.

== Championship match ==
=== Organization ===
The match took place in Astana, Kazakhstan, from 9 April to 30 April 2023 at the St Regis Astana Hotel.

The prize fund was €2 million. It would have been split 60% vs 40% between the winner and the runner-up had either player scored 7½ or more points in the classical portion of the match. As the match was tied after 14 classical games, the prize fund was split 55% vs 45% in favor of the winner of the tiebreak. The main sponsor for the event was Freedom Holding Corp., a Kazakhstan-based Russian investment company with ties to the Central Asian region, with chess training app Chessable, mining company LLP Tioline, and the Kazakhstan Chess Federation also sponsoring the event.

The chief arbiter was Nebojša Baralić from Serbia, while the deputy arbiter was Gerhard Bertagnolli from Italy.

The first move of each classical game was ceremonially performed by guests invited by the organisers:

Game	Guest	
1	Ashat Oralov	Minister of Culture and Sports for Kazakhstan
2	Timur Turlov	President of the Kazakhstan Chess Federation and CEO of Freedom Holding Corp.
3	Talgat Musabayev	Soviet and Kazakh cosmonaut
4	Mike Klein	FIDE Master and CCO for ChessKid.com
5	Serik Sapiyev	Kazakh amateur boxer and 2012 Summer Olympics gold medalist (men's welterweight boxing)
6	Dana Reizniece-Ozola	Woman Grandmaster, Deputy Chair of the FIDE Management Board, and politician
7	Jeroen van den Berg	Tournament Director for the Tata Steel Chess Tournament
8	Victor Dolgalev	Director of LLP Tioline, a sponsor of the event
9	Marat Azilkhanov	Deputy Chairman of the Assembly of the People of Kazakhstan
10	Kunsulu Zakarya	Head of the Kazakhstan Academy of Sciences
11	Kanat Sharlapaev	Chairman of the Board of Baiterek National Managing Holding
12	Dimash Qudaibergen	Kazakh singer-songwriter
13	Zhenis Kassymbek	Akim (Mayor) of Astana
14	Alanna Berikkyzy	Winner of the FIDE World School Chess Championships 2023 in the Girls Under 9 category

=== Match regulations ===
The time control for each game in the classical portion of the match was 120 minutes per side for the first 40 moves, 60 minutes for the next 20 moves, and 15 minutes for the rest of the game, with a 30-second increment per move starting with move 61.

The match was best of 14 games; a score of at least 7½ would win the world championship. Due to the score being equal after 14 games, tiebreak games with faster time controls were played:

- A match consisting of 4 rapid games with 25 minutes per side and a 10-second increment starting with move 1 will be played. If a player scores 2½ points or more, he would win the championship.
- If the score had been equal after the rapid portion, a mini-match of two blitz games would have been played, with a time control of 5 minutes per side and a 3-second increment starting with move 1. If a player scored 1½ points or more, he would win the championship. If the blitz mini-match was tied, another mini-match with the same conditions would be played to decide the winner of the championship. A drawing of lots would take place before each mini-match to decide which player plays with the white pieces.
- If both blitz mini-matches were tied, a single blitz game with a time control of 3 minutes per side and a 2-second increment starting with move 1 would be played, and the winner would win the championship. A drawing of lots would decide which player plays with the white pieces. If this game was drawn, another blitz game with reversed colours would be played with the same time control, and the winner would win the championship. This process would be repeated until either player wins a game.

Players were not allowed to agree to a draw before Black's 40th move. A draw claim before then was only permitted if a threefold repetition or stalemate has occurred.

=== Previous head-to-head record ===
The pre-match head-to-head score between Nepomniachtchi and Ding in classical games was: 3 wins for Nepomniachtchi, 2 wins for Ding, with 8 draws. Their most recent pre-championship games, during the 2022 Candidates tournament, resulted in one win to Nepomniachtchi and one draw.

Head-to-head record
		Nepomniachtchi wins	Draw	Ding wins	Total
Classical	Nepomniachtchi (white) – Ding (black)	2	5	0	7
Classical	Ding (white) – Nepomniachtchi (black)	1	3	2	6
Classical	Total	3	8	2	13
Blitz / rapid / exhibition		13	17	9	39
Total		16	25	11	52

=== Seconds ===
Nepomniachtchi worked with second Nikita Vitiugov, along with Maxim Matlakov and Ildar Khairullin, while also consulting with former world champion Vladimir Kramnik. Ding chose Richárd Rapport as his main second. The other members of his team were Jakhongir Vakhidov, and two people from Peking University. He received advice from Wei Yi and Ni Hua.

=== Schedule ===
The games began at 15:00 local time (EKT), which was 09:00 UTC.

Colours were drawn at the opening ceremony using a robotic arm assisted by artificial intelligence. Nepomniachtchi received the white pieces for the first game. Colours alternated thereafter, with no switching at the halfway point. Colours for the rapid games were drawn at the press conference after game 14: Ding received the white pieces for the first game.

Date	Event
Friday, 7 April	Opening ceremony
Saturday, 8 April	Media day
Sunday, 9 April	Game 1
Monday, 10 April	Game 2
Tuesday, 11 April	Rest day
Wednesday, 12 April	Game 3
Thursday, 13 April	Game 4
Friday, 14 April	Rest day
Saturday, 15 April	Game 5
Sunday, 16 April	Game 6
Monday, 17 April	Rest day
Tuesday, 18 April	Game 7
Wednesday, 19 April	Rest day
Thursday, 20 April	Game 8
Friday, 21 April	Game 9
Saturday, 22 April	Rest day
Sunday, 23 April	Game 10
Monday, 24 April	Game 11
Tuesday, 25 April	Rest day
Wednesday, 26 April	Game 12
Thursday, 27 April	Game 13
Friday, 28 April	Rest day
Saturday, 29 April	Game 14
Sunday, 30 April	Tiebreaks
Monday, 1 May	Closing ceremony

If the match had ended before 14 games (because one player reached 7½ or more points), the closing ceremony would have been conducted either on the day of the last game or the day after. Had the match ended with the 14th classical game, the closing ceremony would have been held on 30 April. The closing ceremony was held on 1 May, due to the score being tied after 14 classical games.

=== Leak of Ding Liren's preparation ===
Shortly after the beginning of game 8, a Reddit post pointed to two accounts on Lichess named "opqrstuv" and "FVitelli", and speculated these belonged to Ding Liren and his second Richárd Rapport. The accounts had played games against each other which followed the openings of games 2, 6, and 8 of the Championship match. An account also named "FVitelli" on Chess.com had played a series of games against user "autumnstream" who self-identified as being from China, with the openings mirroring those played in the match. "FVitelli" changed their username to "ggwhynot" after the rumors emerged, seemingly acknowledging that they were at least aware of the reports. Many commentators considered the leak to be genuine, with Hikaru Nakamura stating that "there's zero chance these aren't their accounts."

The leak could have significantly disadvantaged Ding, as Nepomniachtchi could prepare against these and other opening lines. When asked about the rumours during the post-game press conference, Ding said, "I don't know which games you refer [to]." After game 10, Nepomniachtchi was asked if the leak affected his preparation, responding, "My team took a look. I wouldn't say it should be as hyped as it actually is. I am still more or less doing what I was going to do. We didn't change it too much." After the conclusion of the Championship, Ding confirmed the leak in an interview, saying he "realised it left [them] with no real ideas, so [they] had to come up with new ones" during the match.

=== Results ===
World Chess Championship 2023
	Rating	Classical games														Points	Rapid games				Total
	Rating	1	2	3	4	5	6	7	8	9	10	11	12	13	14	Points	15	16	17	18	Total
Ian Nepomniachtchi (FIDE)	2795	½	1	½	0	1	0	1	½	½	½	½	0	½	½	7	½	½	½	0	8½
Ding Liren (CHN)	2788	½	0	½	1	0	1	0	½	½	½	½	1	½	½	7	½	½	½	1	9½

=== Classical games ===
==== Game 1: Nepomniachtchi–Ding, ½–½ ====
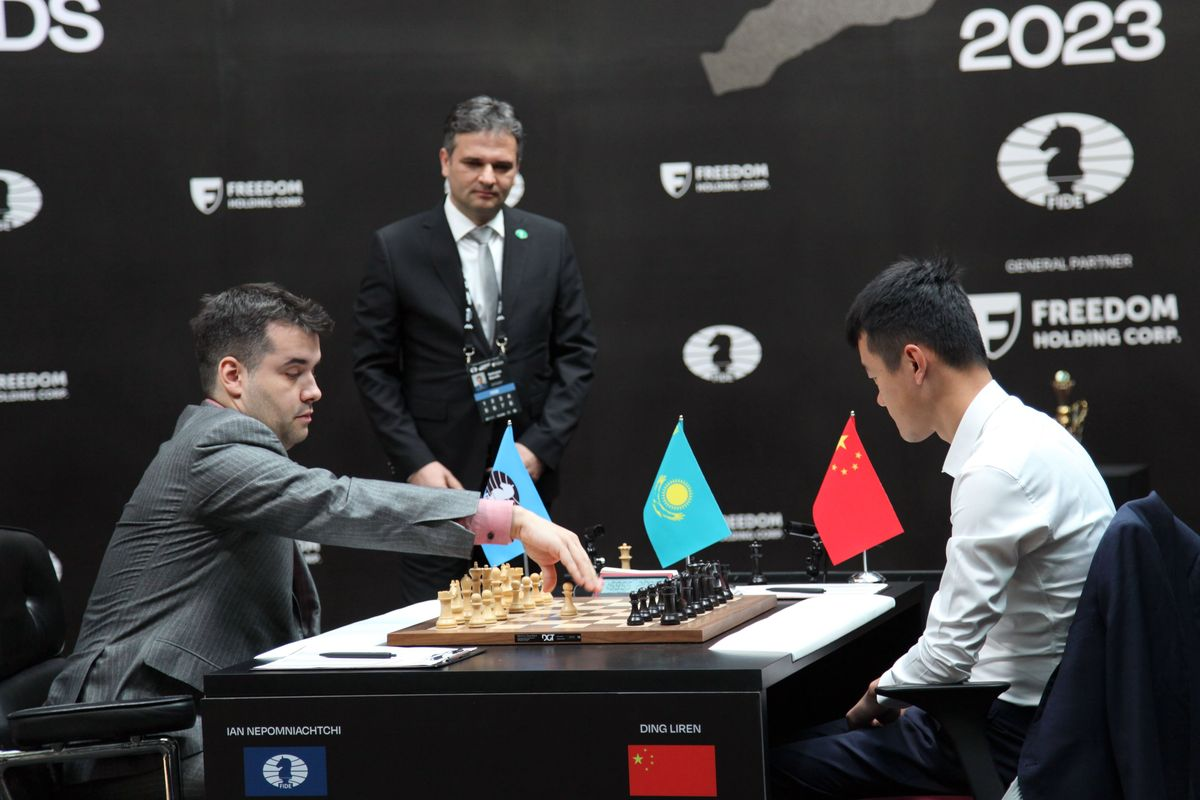
Beginning of game 1

Nepomniachtchi–Ding, game 1

Position: d8 black rook, g8 black king, c7 black pawn, e7 black queen, f7 black bishop, g7 black pawn, b6 black pawn, e6 black knight, f6 black pawn, h6 black pawn, a5 black pawn, c5 black pawn, e4 white pawn, a3 white pawn, d3 white rook, f3 white pawn, g3 white bishop, h3 white pawn, b2 white pawn, c2 white pawn, d2 white queen, e2 white knight, g2 white pawn, h2 white king

Position after 25.Qd2. Here Ding (Black) opted to advance a pawn with 25...c6?!, rather than initiate the trade of rooks on the d-file. Anish Giri and Jan Gustafsson disapproved of the move as it created a long-term weakness of Black's queenside pawn structure. After the continuation 26.Rxd8+ Nxd8, Nepomniachtchi (White) countered with the move 27.Qf4!, giving White a near-winning advantage as Giri speculated that Ding overlooked the threat of 27...Qb7 28.Qc7!, rather than the move 28.Qb8.

The first game of the match, a 49-move draw, was played on 9 April. Nepomniachtchi began with 1.e4, with both players quickly playing into the Ruy Lopez. Nepomniachtchi surprised commentators with the rare sideline 6.Bxc6 dxc6 7.Re1, and, in the words of Erwin l'Ami, obtained a "risk-free position and long-term structural edge". Nepomniachtchi missed a tactical opportunity early with 14.Nf5 (14.h3! would have set up 14...Qxd4? 15.Nd5!!), but the game otherwise stayed mostly level until the move 25...c6?!, with Nepomniachtchi quickly playing 26.Rxd8+ Nxd8 27.Qf4!, forming a battery towards Ding's weakened queenside and gaining the initiative. With Ding low on time, a few inaccuracies by Nepomniachtchi (30.Ng3 and 31.f4) allowed Ding to force a trade of queens and consolidate his position, reaching an equal endgame by move 38. A draw was agreed on move 49 after just under five hours of play.

Ding, in the post-game press conference, provided insight into his morale during and following the game: "I'm not happy; I'm a little bit depressed. During the game, I felt a flow of inconsistency. In the first part of the game, I couldn't concentrate and think about chess. My mind was full of memories and feelings. Maybe I couldn't calculate because of the pressure of the match."

Ruy Lopez, Delayed Exchange Variation Deferred 6.Bxc6 (ECO C85)
1. e4 e5 2. Nf3 Nc6 3. Bb5 a6 4. Ba4 Nf6 5. 0-0 Be7 6. Bxc6 dxc6 7. Re1 Nd7 8. d4 exd4 9. Qxd4 0-0 10. Bf4 Nc5 11. Qe3 Bg4 12. Nd4 Qd7 13. Nc3 Rad8 14. Nf5 Ne6 15. Nxe7+ Qxe7 16. Bg3 Bh5 17. f3 f6 18. h3 h6 19. Kh2 Bf7 20. Rad1 b6 21. a3 a5 22. Ne2 Rxd1 23. Rxd1 Rd8 24. Rd3 c5 25. Qd2 (diagram) c6 26. Rxd8+ Nxd8 27. Qf4 b5 28. Qb8 Kh7 29. Bd6 Qd7 30. Ng3 Ne6 31. f4 h5 32. c3 c4 33. h4 Qd8 34. Qb7 Be8 35. Nf5 Qd7 36. Qb8 Qd8 37. Qxd8 Nxd8 38. Nd4 Nb7 39. e5 Kg8 40. Kg3 Bd7 41. Bc7 Nc5 42. Bxa5 Kf7 43. Bb4 Nd3 44. e6+ Bxe6 45. Nxc6 Bd7 46. Nd4 Nxb2 47. Kf3 Nd3 48. g3 Nc1 49. Ke3 ½–½

==== Game 2: Ding–Nepomniachtchi, 0–1 ====
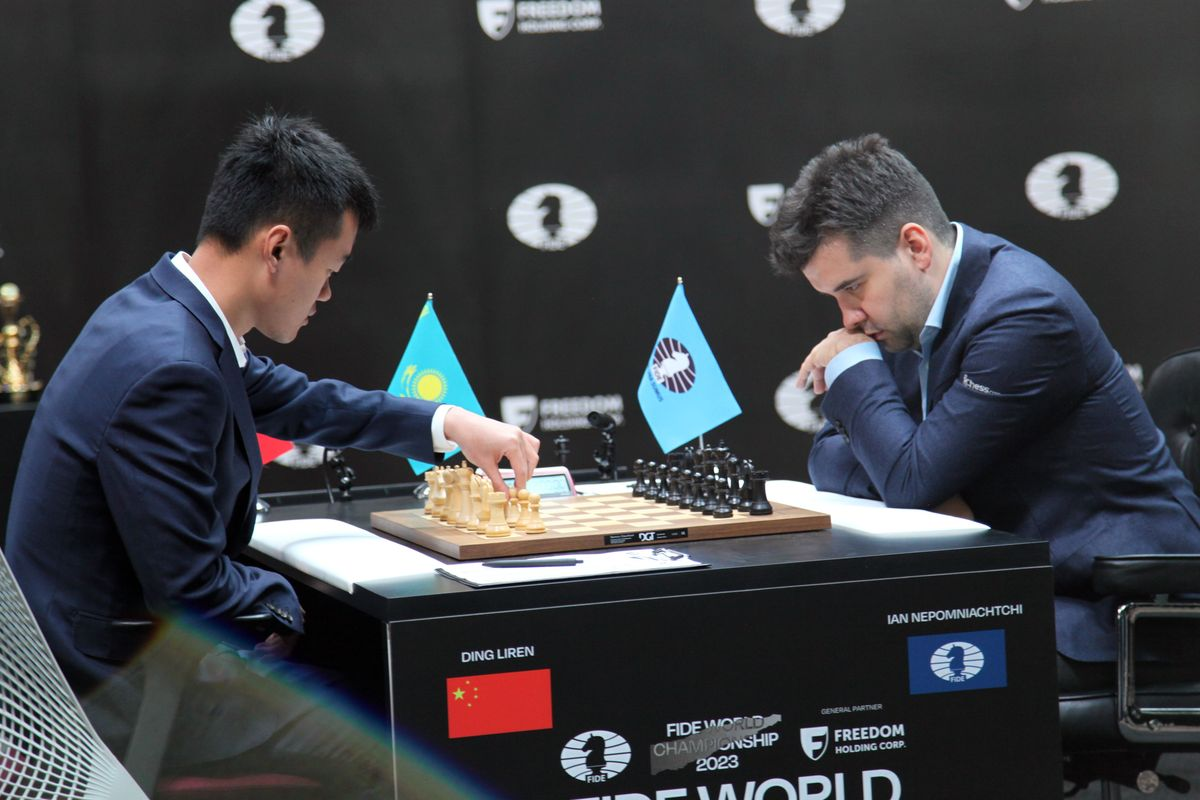
Beginning of game 2

Ding–Nepomniachtchi, game 2

Position: a8 black rook, d8 black queen, e8 black king, f8 black bishop, h8 black rook, b7 black bishop, f7 black pawn, g7 black pawn, h7 black pawn, a6 black pawn, e6 black pawn, f6 black knight, a5 black knight, c5 black pawn, a4 white pawn, b4 black pawn, d4 white pawn, e4 white knight, d3 white bishop, e3 white pawn, f3 white knight, h3 white pawn, b2 white pawn, f2 white pawn, g2 white pawn, a1 white rook, c1 white bishop, d1 white queen, f1 white rook, g1 white king

Position after 11...Na5. Ding took 33 minutes to play 12.Nxf6+?! instead of 12.Nxc5, later identifying during the post-game press conference that the move weakened his position as the continuation 12.Nxc5 Bxc5 13.dxc5 Nd7 would have maintained Ding's advantage. Nepomniachtchi's aggressive response of 12...gxf6 13.e4? (much better was 13.dxc5 with chances to retain equality) 13...c4! consolidated a strong pawn structure and allowed his rook to occupy the open g-file.

The second game of the match, a 29-move win for Nepomniachtchi, was played on 10 April. After 1.d4 Nf6 2.c4 e6 3.Nf3 d5 Ding played 4.h3, a move that had never been seen before at master level. Nepomniachtchi said at the press conference that he initially wrote 4.g3 (a standard move which would have led into a Catalan) on his score sheet, before realizing 4.h3 had been played. Alexander Shabalov stated that "[4.h3] definitely comes from Richard Rapport, Ding's second", which Ding confirmed. Nepomniachtchi decided to play 4...dxc4 and treat the game as a Queen's Gambit Accepted, on the basis that White's h2–h3 is not particularly useful in that line. After playing most of his moves almost instantly, Ding took over 30 minutes to play the move 12.Nxf6+, later identifying the move as a critical moment, saying he had only looked at 12...Qxf6 and entirely overlooked Nepomniachtchi's response 12...gxf6. Ding's follow-up 13.e4?! was criticized for weakening his position; commentators recommended 13.dxc5 with approximate equality. Nepomniachtchi subsequently took over the initiative: his move 18...f5! was highly praised; it set the spectacular trap 19.exf5 Rxd4!! 20.Nxd4 (other moves avoid mate but lose material) 20...Rxg2+ 21.Kf1 Rxf2+! 22.Kxf2 Qh2+ 23.Ke3 Bh6#. Nepomniachtchi confirmed in the post-game interview that he felt that he was winning after 18...f5. Ding avoided this trap with 19.Bc2, which was nonetheless a concession—Ding's previous play seemed to be aimed at putting the bishop on f1. After 20.Bg5, Nepomniachtchi sacrificed an exchange with 20...Rxg5!, gaining the d-pawn and a dominating position after 21.Nxg5 Nxd4, and the e-pawn shortly afterwards. Already after move 20, Ding had less than 20 minutes remaining on his clock to Nepomniachtchi's 60, and he would need to play 20 more moves to reach the time bonus at move 40. Throughout the remaining moves of the game, Ding's time dwindled and his position worsened, until, after 29...e5, leaving the rook on d4 no safe squares, Ding resigned with less than a minute remaining on his clock.

Queen's Gambit Accepted (ECO D27)
1. d4 Nf6 2. c4 e6 3. Nf3 d5 4. h3 dxc4 5. e3 c5 6. Bxc4 a6 7. 0-0 Nc6 8. Nc3 b5 9. Bd3 Bb7 10. a4 b4 11. Ne4 Na5 (diagram) 12. Nxf6+ gxf6 13. e4 c4 14. Bc2 Qc7 15. Bd2 Rg8 16. Rc1 0-0-0 17. Bd3 Kb8 18. Re1 f5 19. Bc2 Nc6 20. Bg5 Rxg5 21. Nxg5 Nxd4 22. Qh5 f6 23. Nf3 Nxc2 24. Rxc2 Bxe4 25. Rd2 Bd6 26. Kh1 c3 27. bxc3 bxc3 28. Rd4 c2 29. Qh6 e5 0–1

==== Game 3: Nepomniachtchi–Ding, ½–½ ====
Nepomniachtchi–Ding, game 3

Position: c8 black rook, d8 black rook, g8 black king, b7 black pawn, f7 black pawn, g7 black pawn, e6 black knight, f6 black queen, h6 black pawn, a5 black pawn, b5 white knight, d5 black pawn, a4 white knight, c4 black knight, a3 white pawn, e3 white pawn, f3 white pawn, b2 white pawn, f2 white queen, g2 white pawn, h2 white pawn, d1 white rook, e1 white rook, g1 white king

Position after 27.Nb5. In the post-game press conference, Ding identified 27...d4!? as a way to attempt to press for an advantage, but decided it to be too risky. After 27...Nc7, the game was drawn by threefold repetition with 28.Nd4 Ne6 29.Nb5 Nc7 30.Nd4 Ne6.

The third game of the match, a 30-move draw, was played on 12 April. Commentators noted it represented a much improved performance by Ding. The game, a Queen's Gambit Declined, followed a game which Ding had previously drawn as Black against Anish Giri in an online rapid game in 2022 until 17.N1e2. Nepomniachtchi later stated that he had looked at the game prior to the round. Ding identified 21...Nxd7 as a critical moment where he began to play for a win, but chose to invite a repetition after 27.Nb5 with 27...Nc7. In the post-game interview, Ding stated he had considered 27...d4 as a potential move to continue playing for a win, but decided it would have been too risky. The game was drawn by repetition shortly afterwards.

At the post-game press conference, Ding stated, "I was not happy with the result. I was trying to play for a win at some point, but I couldn't find a way to break through. So, I think a draw is a decent result for both of us." Nepomniachtchi made comments to the same effect, remarking that "The Queen's Gambit Declined is a very solid opening, so you're not going to achieve much. The most common case is when both sides play reasonably. It is hard to disrupt the equality."

Queen's Gambit Declined, Exchange Variation (ECO D35)
1. d4 Nf6 2. c4 e6 3. Nc3 d5 4. cxd5 exd5 5. Bg5 c6 6. e3 h6 7. Bh4 Be7 8. Bd3 0-0 9. Qc2 Re8 10. Nge2 Nbd7 11. 0-0 a5 12. a3 Nh5 13. Bxe7 Qxe7 14. Rae1 Nf8 15. Nc1 Nf6 16. f3 Ne6 17. N1e2 c5 18. Bb5 Rd8 19. dxc5 Qxc5 20. Qd2 Bd7 21. Bxd7 Nxd7 22. Nd4 Nb6 23. Rd1 Nc4 24. Qf2 Rac8 25. Na4 Qe7 26. Rfe1 Qf6 27. Nb5 (diagram) Nc7 28. Nd4 Ne6 29. Nb5 Nc7 30. Nd4 Ne6 ½–½

==== Game 4: Ding–Nepomniachtchi, 1–0 ====
Ding–Nepomniachtchi, game 4

Position: e8 black rook, g8 black king, a7 black pawn, c7 black pawn, e7 black rook, g7 black pawn, h7 black pawn, b6 black pawn, e6 white pawn, f6 black pawn, h6 black queen, c5 black pawn, d5 white pawn, c4 white pawn, d4 black knight, e4 white rook, f4 black pawn, f3 white queen, h3 white pawn, a2 white pawn, d2 white knight, f2 white pawn, g2 white pawn, e1 white rook, g1 white king

Position after 28...Nd4?. Ding responded with 29.Rxd4! cxd4 30.Nb3, with the knight ready to win back the d-pawn. The knight was stronger than a rook under the circumstances of the position, due to White's space advantage and the closed state of the board.

The fourth game of the match, a 47-move win for Ding, was played on 13 April. The game began with an English Opening, Four Knights Variation. Nepomniachtchi's 9...Nf4 followed an earlier game won by Ding's second Rapport, leading Anish Giri to speculate that he had confused some of his preparation. This was later confirmed by Nepomniachtchi in the press conference. 14...Na5 was also inaccurate, as the knight would have a difficult time getting back into play while Ding created a strong central presence. Ding made the dynamic decision to sacrifice a pawn with 15.c5 in order to create an advanced pawn center. 23...f6 was a move Nepomniachtchi later called "unnecessary"; it allowed Ding to play 24.e6, giving him a passed e-pawn and a strong pawn chain, but in return Black was able to establish the knight on a strong defensive square at d6. Nepomniachtchi was still in the game until he blundered with 28...Nd4?, a decision former world champion Viswanathan Anand described as "insane". Ding made the strong exchange sacrifice 29.Rxd4!, and after 29...cxd4 30.Nb3, the knight is ready to dominate the black position from d4. Ding said he originally considered 29.Qd3 as a response, but found the winning move after thinking for just over a minute, while Nepomniachtchi confirmed that he did not see it until it was played. Even though the position was completely lost for Black, Nepomniachtchi played on, with Ding precisely converting his advantage. Nepomniachtchi eventually resigned on move 47, bringing the match score back to equality.

English Opening, Four Knights System (ECO A28)
1. c4 Nf6 2. Nc3 e5 3. Nf3 Nc6 4. e3 Bb4 5. Qc2 Bxc3 6. bxc3 d6 7. e4 0-0 8. Be2 Nh5 9. d4 Nf4 10. Bxf4 exf4 11. 0-0 Qf6 12. Rfe1 Re8 13. Bd3 Bg4 14. Nd2 Na5 15. c5 dxc5 16. e5 Qh6 17. d5 Rad8 18. c4 b6 19. h3 Bh5 20. Be4 Re7 21. Qc3 Rde8 22. Bf3 Nb7 23. Re2 f6 24. e6 Nd6 25. Rae1 Nf5 26. Bxh5 Qxh5 27. Re4 Qh6 28. Qf3 Nd4 (diagram) 29. Rxd4 cxd4 30. Nb3 g5 31. Nxd4 Qg6 32. g4 fxg3 33. fxg3 h5 34. Nf5 Rh7 35. Qe4 Kh8 36. e7 Qf7 37. d6 cxd6 38. Nxd6 Qg8 39. Nxe8 Qxe8 40. Qe6 Kg7 41. Rf1 Rh6 42. Rd1 f5 43. Qe5+ Kf7 44. Qxf5+ Rf6 45. Qh7+ Ke6 46. Qg7 Rg6 47. Qf8 1–0

==== Game 5: Nepomniachtchi–Ding, 1–0 ====
Nepomniachtchi–Ding, game 5

Position: b8 black rook, d8 black queen, f8 black king, f7 black pawn, g7 black pawn, d6 black pawn, b5 black pawn, c5 black bishop, d5 white queen, f5 white pawn, g5 black pawn, h5 white pawn, c4 black pawn, g4 white rook, c3 white pawn, f3 white knight, b2 white pawn, f2 white pawn, f1 white king

Position after 38.Rg4. The solid-looking move 38...f6 would run into 39.Nh4, with 39...gxh4 40.h6! destroying the black position, while any other move in response would allow the knight to get into the incredible outpost on g6. Rather than invite this, Ding played 38...Ra8, giving back the pawn with 39.Nxg5.

The fifth game of the match, a 48-move win for Nepomniachtchi, was played on 15 April. Nepomniachtchi was praised by commentators for his opening preparation, with many noting that he spent very little time making his moves until move 23, a time advantage which only grew as the game progressed. Anish Giri criticized the moves 19...Bd8!? and 20...Ne7!? by Ding, calling it "the most uncomfortable setup". Ding would later state, "I think the critical moment is that I should have played 29...Qf6 instead of 29...Nxf5." Commentators stated that 29...Nxf5 was not a poor move on its own, but 30...Qf6 was the mistake, suggesting that 30...Qd7 would have held the equality. Nepomniachtchi quickly launched a kingside attack, playing the pawn break 37.g5!, to which Ding's response 37...hxg5 was considered "losing completely" by Giri. After 38.Rg4, the natural-looking 38...f6, defending the pawn, would have run into 39.Nh4!, where 39...gxh4 40.h6! decimates the black position. 38...Ra8 was instead played, allowing Nepomniachtchi to regain the pawn with 39.Nxg5. Nepomniachtchi converted the positional advantage precisely, with the move 48.Rh6 convincing Ding to resign after 15 minutes of analyzing the position.

Ruy Lopez, Closed Defence, Martinez Variation (ECO C84)
1. e4 e5 2. Nf3 Nc6 3. Bb5 a6 4. Ba4 Nf6 5. 0-0 Be7 6. d3 b5 7. Bb3 d6 8. c3 0-0 9. h3 Bb7 10. a4 Na5 11. Ba2 c5 12. Bg5 h6 13. Bxf6 Bxf6 14. axb5 axb5 15. Nbd2 Nc6 16. Bd5 Rxa1 17. Qxa1 Qd7 18. Re1 Ra8 19. Qd1 Bd8 20. Nf1 Ne7 21. Bxb7 Qxb7 22. Ne3 Bb6 23. h4 Qc6 24. h5 c4 25. d4 exd4 26. Nxd4 Qc5 27. Qg4 Qe5 28. Nf3 Qe6 29. Nf5 Nxf5 30. exf5 Qf6 31. Qe4 Rb8 32. Re2 Bc5 33. g4 Qd8 34. Qd5 Kf8 35. Kf1 Rc8 36. Re4 Rb8 37. g5 hxg5 38. Rg4 (diagram) Ra8 39. Nxg5 Ra1+ 40. Ke2 Qe7+ 41. Ne4 Qe8 42. Kf3 Qa8 43. Qxa8+ Rxa8 44. f6 g6 45. hxg6 fxg6 46. Rxg6 Ra2 47. Kg4 Rxb2 48. Rh6 1–0

==== Game 6: Ding–Nepomniachtchi, 1–0 ====
Ding–Nepomniachtchi, game 6

Position: a8 black rook, e8 black rook, g8 black king, b7 black pawn, f7 black pawn, g7 black pawn, a6 black pawn, f6 black queen, g6 black bishop, h6 black pawn, c5 white knight, e5 white rook, h5 white pawn, c4 black pawn, d4 white pawn, a3 white rook, c3 white pawn, g3 white queen, b2 white pawn, f2 white pawn, g2 white pawn, g1 white king

Position after 27.h5. Commentators suggested that 27...Rxe5 28.dxe5 Qd8! would have given Nepomniachtchi an easier position to defend, as capturing the bishop with 29.hxg6? would have allowed perpetual check with 29...Qd1+ 30.Kh2 Qh5+. Instead, Nepomniachtchi played 27...Bc2?!, which allowed Ding to consolidate an advantage. Nepomniachtchi suggested 27...Bd3 as well, a move that would have led to a defendable though not equal position.

Position: f8 black rook, h8 black king, a7 white rook, e7 white knight, g7 black pawn, f6 black pawn, h6 black pawn, h5 white pawn, d4 white pawn, a3 black pawn, c3 white pawn, g3 white queen, f2 white pawn, g2 white pawn, h2 white king, b1 black bishop, c1 black queen

Position after 40...Rf8. Here Ding played 41.d5 after having thought for nearly 20 minutes. Despite not being the best option according to the chess engines, Ding would later finish the game by threatening the queen sacrifice 45.Qxg8+ Kxg8 46.Ra8+ Kf7 47.Rf8#, with the pawn on d5 preventing the king from escaping to e6. David Howell described the combination as "one of the most beautiful finishes to a world championship game in history".

The sixth game of the match, a 44-move win for Ding, was played on 16 April. Ding played the London System, making this game the first time it has appeared in a World Championship match. Despite this, Nepomniachtchi said that he did expect to see it at some point. After 14...Nd7 15.Nxd7 Qxd7, 16.a5! fixed Nepomniachtchi's queenside pawn structure, giving the white position a small edge. With a lack of active plans, Nepomniachtchi began to prepare the pawn break 22...e5. Ding mentioned that his initial plan was to play 23.b4, a move that would have invited less counterplay than the game move, 23.Rb3. Despite Ding being much lower on time, it was Nepomniachtchi who allowed his opponent to consolidate his slight edge. 27...Rxe5 28.dxe5 Qd8! would have allowed Nepomniachtchi to fight on, as 29.hxg6? would allow him to force a draw by perpetual check via 29...Qd1+ 30.Kh2 Qh5+. Instead of this, 27...Bc2 was played, allowing Ding to win the b7-pawn. 32.Rc5? was a hasty move that could have let Nepomniachtchi back into the game if he found 32...Qxc3; however, 32...Qc1+ was played, giving the initiative back to Ding. As the players reached the time control, Ding spent 20 minutes on the move 41.d5, taking away the e6-square for a mating net. After 41...a2 42.Qc7 Kh7 43.Ng6 Rg8 44.Qf7!, Nepomniachtchi resigned, as the threat of 45.Qxg8+ Kxg8 46.Ra8+ Kf7 47.Rf8# is unstoppable.

On the game, Nepomniachtchi would state, "I played one of my worst games ever. Every move was bad… 27...Bd3 instead of 27...Bc2 was better, but even that was unfortunate." When asked about the frequency of decisive games in the match, Nepomniachtchi declined to answer, while Ding responded jokingly, "I guess we are not as professional as Magnus [Carlsen]."

London System (ECO D02)
1. d4 Nf6 2. Nf3 d5 3. Bf4 c5 4. e3 Nc6 5. Nbd2 cxd4 6. exd4 Bf5 7. c3 e6 8. Bb5 Bd6 9. Bxd6 Qxd6 10. 0-0 0-0 11. Re1 h6 12. Ne5 Ne7 13. a4 a6 14. Bf1 Nd7 15. Nxd7 Qxd7 16. a5 Qc7 17. Qf3 Rfc8 18. Ra3 Bg6 19. Nb3 Nc6 20. Qg3 Qe7 21. h4 Re8 22. Nc5 e5 23. Rb3 Nxa5 24. Rxe5 Qf6 25. Ra3 Nc4 26. Bxc4 dxc4 27. h5 (first diagram) Bc2 28. Nxb7 Qb6 29. Nd6 Rxe5 30. Qxe5 Qxb2 31. Ra5 Kh7 32. Rc5 Qc1+ 33. Kh2 f6 34. Qg3 a5 35. Nxc4 a4 36. Ne3 Bb1 37. Rc7 Rg8 38. Nd5 Kh8 39. Ra7 a3 40. Ne7 Rf8 (second diagram) 41. d5 a2 42. Qc7 Kh7 43. Ng6 Rg8 44. Qf7 1–0

==== Game 7: Nepomniachtchi–Ding, 1–0 ====
Nepomniachtchi–Ding, game 7

Position: g8 black king, a7 black pawn, f7 black pawn, d6 black queen, e6 black pawn, f6 black bishop, g6 black pawn, c5 black pawn, d5 black rook, c4 white rook, h4 white pawn, b3 white pawn, c3 white pawn, e3 white queen, a2 white pawn, h2 white pawn, e1 white rook, g1 white king

Position after 32.gxh4. Ding spent most of his remaining 5 minutes on the move 32...Rd2?, which allowed Nepomniachtchi to equalize, whereas 32...Be5 would have been much better, allowing Ding to have long-term pressure. After the natural 33.Re2, and with only 44 seconds on the clock, Ding played 33...Rd3? (mandatory was guarding the pawn with 33...Rd5, or giving check first with 33...Rd1+ 34.Kg2 Rd5), and after 34.Qxc5 Nepomniachtchi had a decisive advantage.

The seventh game of the match, a 37-move win for Nepomniachtchi, was played on 18 April. In reply to 1.e4, Ding deviated from his usual 1...e5, surprising his opponent and the commentators by opting for the French Defence, an opening last seen in a world championship match in 1978 (played there twice by Viktor Korchnoi; both games ended in a draw). Ding later confirmed in the press conference that he had "half-jokingly" suggested the French to his second, Richard Rapport, who then "insisted" that Ding play the opening. Nepomniachtchi chose 3.Nd2, the Tarrasch Variation. During the middlegame, Ding absorbed Nepomniachtchi's early pressure with accurate defence; however, by move 19 he was running low on time, having only 26 minutes to reach the time control with 21 moves to go. Despite this he found the strong exchange sacrifice 22...Nxf4! 23.Bxf4 Rxf4! 24.Rxf4 Bxe5, which gave him a strong bishop pair and some initiative; at this point commentators believed he had a slight advantage. With less than six minutes remaining on the clock for nine moves, Ding spent five minutes on the move 32...Rd2? (32...Be5! was best) which relinquished the advantage. He then blundered an important pawn after 33.Re2 Rd3?. Nepomniachtchi now had a winning position, and Ding resigned on move 37 with just 3 seconds left on his clock.

French Defence, Tarrasch Variation (ECO C07)
1. e4 e6 2. d4 d5 3. Nd2 c5 4. Ngf3 cxd4 5. Nxd4 Nf6 6. exd5 Nxd5 7. N2f3 Be7 8. Bc4 Nc6 9. Nxc6 bxc6 10. 0-0 0-0 11. Qe2 Bb7 12. Bd3 Qc7 13. Qe4 Nf6 14. Qh4 c5 15. Bf4 Qb6 16. Ne5 Rad8 17. Rae1 g6 18. Bg5 Rd4 19. Qh3 Qc7 20. b3 Nh5 21. f4 Bd6 22. c3 Nxf4 23. Bxf4 Rxf4 24. Rxf4 Bxe5 25. Rh4 Rd8 26. Be4 Bxe4 27. Rhxe4 Rd5 28. Rh4 Qd6 29. Qe3 h5 30. g3 Bf6 31. Rc4 h4 32. gxh4 (diagram) Rd2 33. Re2 Rd3 34. Qxc5 Rd1+ 35. Kg2 Qd3 36. Rf2 Kg7 37. Rcf4 Qxc3 1–0

==== Game 8: Ding–Nepomniachtchi, ½–½ ====
Ding–Nepomniachtchi, game 8

Position: d8 black rook, a7 black pawn, c7 white queen, d7 white pawn, f7 black pawn, g7 black king, b6 black pawn, e6 black pawn, g6 black pawn, c5 black pawn, f5 black knight, g5 white pawn, c4 white pawn, h4 black queen, a3 white pawn, c3 white pawn, d2 white rook, f2 white pawn, e1 white king, f1 white bishop

Position after 31...Qh4. This move was simultaneously described both as "brilliant" and a "bluff". Ding could have won after 32.Qxd8, but had to carefully calculate whether this allowed perpetual check beginning with 32...Qe4+; Rafael Leitão identified the critical line as going all the way to move 43. Under time pressure, Ding could only "briefly check the line", and chose 32.Kd1?, losing most of his advantage.

The eighth game of the match, a 45-move draw, was played on 20 April. In response to the Nimzo-Indian Defence by Nepomniachtchi, Ding opted for 5.a3, the Sämisch Variation, inciting Nepomniachtchi to double his c-pawns with 5...Bxc3+ 6.bxc3. The move 12.h4! was given praise, with Ding temporarily giving up a bishop for an open h-file and a strong attack. Ding quickly gained the advantage, having a passed d-pawn and a strong g-pawn. As Ding began to pressure the black position, Nepomniachtchi blundered with 22...Bxe4??, giving him a completely losing position. As Ding pressed his advantage, Nepomniachtchi played 31...Qh4!?, leaving his rook en prise, but appearing to threaten a draw by perpetual check; Nepomniachtchi would later call it a "bluff", as White can escape perpetual check and win after taking the rook, but this was very difficult to calculate at the board. Ding, under time pressure, was able to only "briefly check the line", as he described in the press conference, and instead opted for 32.Kd1?, losing much of the advantage. After a few more moves, Nepomniachtchi sacrificed his knight with 37...Nxf2! 38.Rxf2 e4 to return the game to equality, with both players rapidly trading down to a rook-and-pawn endgame and agreeing to a draw after 45.Re8.

Nimzo-Indian Defence, Sämisch Variation (ECO E28)
1. d4 Nf6 2. c4 e6 3. Nc3 Bb4 4. e3 0-0 5. a3 Bxc3+ 6. bxc3 d6 7. Ne2 c5 8. Ng3 Nc6 9. Ra2 b6 10. e4 Ba6 11. Bg5 h6 12. h4 hxg5 13. hxg5 g6 14. gxf6 Qxf6 15. e5 dxe5 16. d5 Ne7 17. d6 Nf5 18. Ne4 Qd8 19. Qd3 Kg7 20. g4 Bb7 21. Rh3 Nh4 22. g5 Bxe4 23. Qxe4 Nf5 24. Rd2 Rh8 25. Rxh8 Qxh8 26. d7 Rd8 27. Qxe5+ Kh7 28. Qh2+ Kg7 29. Qe5+ Kh7 30. Qh2+ Kg7 31. Qc7 Qh4 (diagram) 32. Kd1 Qxg5 33. Kc2 Qe7 34. Bg2 e5 35. Be4 Nh6 36. Qxa7 Ng4 37. Bf3 Nxf2 38. Rxf2 e4 39. Re2 f5 40. Qxb6 Rxd7 41. Qb8 Qd6 42. Qxd6 Rxd6 43. Bxe4 fxe4 44. Rxe4 Kf6 45. Re8 ½–½

==== Game 9: Nepomniachtchi–Ding, ½–½ ====
Nepomniachtchi–Ding, game 9

Position: e8 black rook, g8 black king, c7 black queen, f7 black pawn, g7 black pawn, h7 black knight, c6 black pawn, e6 black bishop, a5 black pawn, b5 black rook, c5 black knight, e5 black pawn, a4 black pawn, c4 white bishop, e4 white pawn, a3 white bishop, c3 white pawn, f3 white queen, g3 white knight, h3 white pawn, f2 white pawn, g2 white pawn, a1 white rook, e1 white rook, g1 white king

Position after 26...Be6. Ding later said he anticipated the continuation 27.Bxb5 cxb5, sacrificing the exchange for connected pawns on the a- and b-files. Commentators and engines suggested this was the best move for Nepomniachtchi, but instead, he played 27.Bxe6, considered to be the safer, more human move.

The ninth game of the match, an 82-move draw, was played on 21 April. Against the Ruy Lopez, Ding chose the Berlin Defence. The first inaccuracy, 17...Rb8?! played by Ding, allowed Nepomniachtchi to build an initiative on the kingside; however, this initiative quickly faltered, with 23.Bg5? losing the advantage. Ding offered an exchange sacrifice with 26...Be6, allowing 27.Bxb5 cxb5, which would have given Ding connected passed pawns on the a- and b-files; however, Nepomniachtchi opted to trade bishops instead with 27.Bxe6, which was considered the "safer" move by commentators. Soon after, the players traded down into an endgame of rook, knight, and three pawns for White; versus rook, knight, and two pawns for Black. The pawn sacrifice 55...h3! by Ding received praise, splitting the remaining white pawns and rendering a draw nearly inevitable. Nepomniachtchi attempted to play on with his extra pawn, but a draw was eventually agreed on move 82.

Ruy Lopez, Berlin Defence (ECO C65)
1. e4 e5 2. Nf3 Nc6 3. Bb5 Nf6 4. d3 Bc5 5. c3 0-0 6. 0-0 d5 7. Nbd2 dxe4 8. dxe4 a5 9. a4 Qe7 10. Qc2 Nb8 11. Re1 Rd8 12. h3 h6 13. Nf1 c6 14. Bc4 Na6 15. Ng3 Qc7 16. Ba2 b5 17. Qe2 Rb8 18. Nh4 Bf8 19. Qf3 bxa4 20. Bxh6 Nc5 21. Ng6 Rxb2 22. Nxf8 Rxf8 23. Bg5 Nh7 24. Bc1 Rb5 25. Ba3 Re8 26. Bc4 Be6 (diagram) 27. Bxe6 Nxe6 28. Nf5 c5 29. Qe2 Rb3 30. Qc4 Qc6 31. Bc1 Nf6 32. Qxa4 Qxa4 33. Rxa4 Rxc3 34. Bb2 Rb3 35. Bxe5 Rb4 36. Rxa5 Rxe4 37. Rxe4 Nxe4 38. Ra4 Nd4 39. Bxd4 cxd4 40. Rxd4 g6 41. Ne3 Kg7 42. Rb4 Ng3 43. Rb7 Nf5 44. Ng4 Re7 45. Rb5 Re1+ 46. Kh2 Re2 47. Rb7 Nd6 48. Ra7 Kf8 49. Kg3 f5 50. Kf3 Re7 51. Ra8+ Re8 52. Rxe8+ Kxe8 53. Ne5 g5 54. h4 gxh4 55. Kf4 h3 56. gxh3 Ke7 57. Nc6+ Kf6 58. Nd4 Ne4 59. f3 Nf2 60. h4 Nd3+ 61. Kg3 Kg6 62. Ne6 Kf6 63. Nf4 Nb4 64. Kf2 Ke5 65. Ke3 Nc2+ 66. Kd2 Nd4 67. Nd3+ Kf6 68. Ke3 Nc2+ 69. Kf4 Nd4 70. Kg3 Ne2+ 71. Kf2 Nd4 72. Nf4 Ke5 73. Ne2 Ne6 74. Kg3 Kf6 75. Kg2 Kg7 76. Kf2 f4 77. Kg1 Kg6 78. Kg2 Kh6 79. Nc1 Kh5 80. Kh3 Nd4 81. Nd3 Nxf3 82. Nxf4+ ½–½

==== Game 10: Ding–Nepomniachtchi, ½–½ ====
Ding–Nepomniachtchi, game 10

Position: a8 black rook, c8 black bishop, d8 black queen, e8 black king, h8 black rook, a7 black pawn, b7 black pawn, c7 black pawn, d7 black pawn, f7 black pawn, g7 black pawn, h7 black pawn, c5 black bishop, e5 white pawn, c4 white pawn, c3 white pawn, g3 white queen, a2 white pawn, f2 white pawn, g2 white pawn, h2 white pawn, a1 white rook, c1 white bishop, e1 white king, f1 white bishop, h1 white rook

Position after 10.Qg3. Ding would later say he expected Nepomniachtchi to defend his g-pawn with 10...g6, but after 10...Kf8, Nepomniachtchi was able to quickly steer the game to an equal endgame. Notably, Nepomniachtchi had played the same position in a Titled Tuesdays online tournament game, having the white pieces against Jose Gabriel Cardoso.

The tenth game of the match, a 45-move draw, was played on 23 April. Ding once again chose the English Opening to begin the game, following the same opening as game 4, until Ding chose 4.e4 instead of 4.e3. The move 9...Bc5 came as a surprise to Ding, who spent 11 minutes on his response. After Ding found 10.Qg3, he was once again surprised by the reply 10...Kf8, as he had expected 10...g6 instead. Although he was clearly out of his preparation, Ding navigated the position well and was able to maintain a slight advantage. He entered the endgame up a pawn, but Nepomniachtchi comfortably held the draw. The players finished the game with bare kings, only the second game in World Chess Championship history to end with bare kings on the board, the previous occurrence being game 13 of the 2004 Kramnik–Leko match.

English Opening, Four Knights System (ECO A28)
1. c4 Nf6 2. Nc3 e5 3. Nf3 Nc6 4. e4 Bc5 5. Nxe5 Nxe5 6. d4 Bb4 7. dxe5 Nxe4 8. Qf3 Nxc3 9. bxc3 Bc5 10. Qg3 (diagram) Kf8 11. Be2 d6 12. Bf4 Qe7 13. Rd1 h5 14. 0-0 h4 15. Qd3 g5 16. exd6 cxd6 17. Bxd6 Qxd6 18. Qxd6+ Bxd6 19. Rxd6 Be6 20. f4 Ke7 21. Rd4 gxf4 22. Rfxf4 h3 23. g4 Rac8 24. Kf2 Rc5 25. a4 Ra5 26. Bd1 b6 27. Kg3 Rh6 28. Rfe4 Kf8 29. Rd8+ Kg7 30. Ra8 Rc5 31. Rxa7 Bxc4 32. Rae7 Rhc6 33. R7e5 Rxe5 34. Rxe5 Bb3 35. Bxb3 Rxc3+ 36. Kh4 Rxb3 37. Rb5 Ra3 38. Rxb6 Rxa4 39. Kxh3 f5 40. gxf5 Rf4 41. Rb5 Kf6 42. Kg3 Rxf5 43. Rxf5+ Kxf5 44. h4 Kg6 45. h5+ Kxh5 ½–½

==== Game 11: Nepomniachtchi–Ding, ½–½ ====
Nepomniachtchi–Ding, game 11

Position: b8 black rook, d8 black queen, f8 black rook, g8 black king, h7 black pawn, a6 black pawn, d6 black pawn, e6 black pawn, g6 black pawn, h6 black bishop, a5 black knight, b5 black pawn, e5 black pawn, c4 black pawn, e4 white pawn, a3 white pawn, d3 white pawn, e3 white knight, a2 white bishop, b2 white pawn, c2 white pawn, d2 white queen, f2 white pawn, g2 white pawn, h2 white pawn, d1 white rook, f1 white rook, g1 white king

Position after 18...Rb8. Nepomniachtchi could have pressed with 19.Qe2, but instead chose to liquidate into a drawn rook endgame with 19.dxc4.

The eleventh game of the match, a 39-move draw, was played on 24 April. Against the Ruy Lopez, Ding returned to the main line with 3...a6, as he did in game 1. Ding and Nepomniachtchi followed the same opening moves as their game in the 2020 Candidates Tournament until Ding played 8...Na5. 15...c4 was considered to be an intriguing move by Ding, inviting a double-edged game. However, instead of 19.Qe2, which would have preserved winning chances for either side, Nepomniachtchi chose 19.dxc4, inviting a series of exchanges that later led to a fully drawn rook endgame, with the players drawing by repetition only a few moves later.

Ruy Lopez, Closed Defence, Martinez Variation (ECO C84)
1. e4 e5 2. Nf3 Nc6 3. Bb5 a6 4. Ba4 Nf6 5. 0-0 Be7 6. d3 b5 7. Bb3 d6 8. a3 Na5 9. Ba2 c5 10. Nc3 Be6 11. Bg5 0-0 12. Bxf6 Bxf6 13. Nd5 g6 14. Qd2 Bg7 15. Ng5 c4 16. Nxe6 fxe6 17. Ne3 Bh6 18. Rad1 Rb8 (diagram) 19. dxc4 Nxc4 20. Bxc4 bxc4 21. Qxd6 Qxd6 22. Rxd6 Bxe3 23. fxe3 Rxf1+ 24. Kxf1 Rxb2 25. Rxe6 Rxc2 26. Rxa6 Ra2 27. Rc6 Rxa3 28. Rxc4 Rxe3 29. Kf2 Ra3 30. Rc5 Ra2+ 31. Kf3 Ra3+ 32. Kg4 Ra2 33. Kh3 Re2 34. Rxe5 Kf7 35. Kg3 Kf6 36. Re8 Kf7 37. Re5 Kf6 38. Re8 Kf7 39. Re5 ½–½

==== Game 12: Ding–Nepomniachtchi, 1–0 ====
Ding–Nepomniachtchi, game 12

Position: a8 black rook, h8 black king, a7 black pawn, f7 black pawn, h7 black pawn, d6 black bishop, e6 black pawn, g6 black rook, g5 black queen, h5 white knight, a4 white pawn, b4 black pawn, c4 white queen, d4 white pawn, f4 black pawn, g4 white pawn, h4 black knight, h3 white pawn, b2 white pawn, c2 white bishop, f2 white pawn, e1 white rook, g1 white rook, h1 white king

Position after 27.Qxc4. This move initiated a series of inaccurate moves by both players. Nepomniachtchi played 27...Rag8?, missing the winning move 27...Nf3. There followed 28.Qc6? Bb8? 29.Qb7?? Rh6??, with Ding bringing the game to equality with 30.Be4. Commentators expressed shock at the sequence, with Viswanathan Anand describing Nepomniachtchi's play in particular as "pure nerves".

Position: b8 black bishop, f8 black rook, h8 black king, a7 black pawn, h7 black pawn, e6 black pawn, g6 black knight, h6 black rook, f5 black pawn, h5 white knight, a4 white pawn, d4 white pawn, f4 black pawn, g4 white pawn, h4 black queen, c3 white queen, h3 white pawn, b2 white pawn, e2 white rook, f2 white pawn, g2 white bishop, g1 white rook, h1 white king

Position after 34...f5??. Commentator Robert Hess identified this move as "winning on the spot" for White. In the post-game conference, Ding stated that he had calculated the best move, 34...f3, but Nepomniachtchi "did not play accurately" and chose a losing move instead. Ding replied immediately with 35.Rxe6, and Nepomniachtchi placed his head on the playing table and covered himself with his hands as he realised he had blundered and given away the equality.

The twelfth game of the match, a 38-move win for Ding, was played on 26 April. The game was a complex and error-ridden affair, with both players showing extreme signs of nerves. For the opening, Ding chose the Colle System, about which Nepomniachtchi would later say "I wasn't surprised," although he played the opening inaccurately and could have been punished with accurate play. Through the double-edged middlegame that developed after Nepomniachtchi allowed the shattering of his kingside pawn structure while having already castled short, play remained relatively equal until Ding made the first mistake with 19.Bc2?, allowing Nepomniachtchi to build pressure on Ding's king down the open g-file and gain the advantage after a series of further inaccuracies by Ding. Though not a mistake, Nepomniachtchi's 26...b4 was perhaps unnecessarily complicated when 26...a6 would have kept a more stable advantage. Despite the complexity of the position, Nepomniachtchi played 27...Rag8? instead of the winning ...Nf3 quickly, which instigated a series of mutual errors with 28.Qc6? Bb8? 29.Qb7?? Rh6??, finishing with Ding finding 30.Be4, leaving the position equal. Fabiano Caruana commented, "This is pure nerves at this point. It's no longer about chess." The game's newfound equality remained until Nepomniachtchi played 34...f5??, allowing Ding to take a free pawn with 35.Rxe6 and gain a powerful kingside attack. Nepomniachtchi spent 17 minutes thinking of a response to Ding's move, leaving him with 2 minutes and 36 seconds to reach the time control at move 40. Many commentators took note of Nepomniachtchi's body language at this point, associating "complete disbelief" to his expression. After a few more moves, Nepomniachtchi resigned, with Ding Liren equalizing the match with two games remaining.

Colle System (ECO D04)
1. d4 Nf6 2. Nf3 d5 3. e3 c5 4. Nbd2 cxd4 5. exd4 Qc7 6. c3 Bd7 7. Bd3 Nc6 8. 0-0 Bg4 9. Re1 e6 10. Nf1 Bd6 11. Bg5 0-0 12. Bxf6 gxf6 13. Ng3 f5 14. h3 Bxf3 15. Qxf3 Ne7 16. Nh5 Kh8 17. g4 Rg8 18. Kh1 Ng6 19. Bc2 Nh4 20. Qe3 Rg6 21. Rg1 f4 22. Qd3 Qe7 23. Rae1 Qg5 24. c4 dxc4 25. Qc3 b5 26. a4 b4 27. Qxc4 (first diagram) Rag8 28. Qc6 Bb8 29. Qb7 Rh6 30. Be4 Rf8 31. Qxb4 Qd8 32. Qc3 Ng6 33. Bg2 Qh4 34. Re2 f5 (second diagram) 35. Rxe6 Rxh5 36. gxh5 Qxh5 37. d5+ Kg8 38. d6 1–0

==== Game 13: Nepomniachtchi–Ding, ½–½ ====
Nepomniachtchi–Ding, game 13

Position: a8 black rook, d8 black queen, e8 black rook, f8 black bishop, g8 black king, b7 black bishop, f7 black pawn, g7 black pawn, a6 black pawn, h6 black pawn, d5 black knight, a4 white pawn, c4 black pawn, d4 white knight, e4 white bishop, f3 white pawn, h3 white pawn, b2 white pawn, f2 white bishop, g2 white pawn, a1 white rook, d1 white queen, f1 white rook, g1 white king

Position after 21.Be4. In this position, Ding spent 25 minutes to play 21...Re5?!, drawing confusion from commentators and giving up the slight advantage he had gained. 21...Rb8 and 21...Qg5 were identified by Rafael Leitão as moves that would have held the advantage. When asked about the move in the post-game press conference, Ding said he had considered 21...Rb8, but chose 21...Re5 to defend the knight on d5.

The thirteenth game of the match, a 40-move draw, was played on 27 April. It began with a Ruy Lopez, Closed Variation, similar to games 5 and 11 of the match. 10.Be3 was the first deviation from theory, a move never seen before at master level. The position remained equal until 18.f3?! by Nepomniachtchi, which allowed Ding to play for the pawn break ...d5. After 19...d5 20.exd5 Nxd5, Ding held a slight advantage. Ding spent 25 minutes of his clock to play 21...Re5?!, giving up the advantage he would have had after 21...Rb8 22.Bxd5 (the knight cannot be allowed to come to f4) Bxd5 23.Qd2, where he has the bishop pair. Nepomniachtchi later gave Ding a chance for an initiative after 23.Ne2; however, Ding played 23...Qe7, blocking the bishop on f8, rather than the superior 23...Qe8. Ding sacrificed the exchange with 25...Rxe4, and the players quickly liquidated into a drawish endgame where Nepomniachtchi was up an exchange, but down a pawn. Ding would later mention he considered playing for a win with 36...Ke6, but decided against it as he "didn't want to play a dark ocean kind of position". The players chose to repeat moves shortly thereafter, ending the game in a draw.

Ruy Lopez, Closed Defence, Martinez Variation (ECO C84)
1. e4 e5 2. Nf3 Nc6 3. Bb5 a6 4. Ba4 Nf6 5. 0-0 Be7 6. d3 b5 7. Bb3 d6 8. c3 0-0 9. h3 Bb7 10. Be3 Na5 11. Bc2 c5 12. Nbd2 Re8 13. a4 h6 14. d4 exd4 15. cxd4 cxd4 16. Nxd4 Nc4 17. Nxc4 bxc4 18. f3 Bf8 19. Bf2 d5 20. exd5 Nxd5 21. Be4 (diagram) Re5 22. Rc1 Rc8 23. Ne2 Qe7 24. Qd4 f5 25. Bg3 Rxe4 26. fxe4 Qxe4 27. Qxe4 fxe4 28. Rfd1 Nb4 29. Rd7 Bc5+ 30. Kh2 Bc6 31. Rc7 Rxc7 32. Bxc7 Bd5 33. Nc3 Nd3 34. Rc2 Bc6 35. a5 Kf7 36. Re2 Nc1 37. Re1 Nd3 38. Re2 Nc1 39. Re1 Nd3 40. Re2 ½–½

==== Game 14: Ding–Nepomniachtchi, ½–½ ====
Ding–Nepomniachtchi, game 14

Position: a8 black rook, c8 black bishop, d8 black queen, f8 black rook, g8 black king, a7 black pawn, b7 black pawn, d7 black knight, e7 black bishop, f7 black pawn, g7 black pawn, h7 black pawn, e6 black pawn, f6 black knight, g5 white knight, c4 white bishop, a3 white pawn, c3 white knight, e3 white pawn, b2 white pawn, c2 white queen, d2 white bishop, f2 white pawn, g2 white pawn, h2 white pawn, d1 white rook, e1 white king, h1 white rook

Position after 12.Ng5

The fourteenth and longest game of the match, a 90-move draw, was played on 29 April. A win for either player would have resulted in winning the entire match and becoming world champion. Ding played 12.Ng5?!, which surprised many due to the fact that the knight could easily be attacked with 12...h6 (as in the game) and did not accomplish much, although the position was still near equality. Ding's 34.Ke2? was a mistake (34.Kd2! was accurate), but Nepomniachtchi relinquished his advantage with 36...e5?! (36...Rb3! was better), and with 38.b6! Ding liquidated into a drawn pawn-down rook endgame. Nepomniachtchi tried to create winning chances with 61...Kd7!, but Ding found the only drawing move 65.f4!. Nepomniachtchi was unable to make any progress and both players finally exchanged off the pieces and agreed to a draw on move 90.

Nimzo-Indian Defence, Rubinstein System (ECO E46)
1. d4 Nf6 2. c4 e6 3. Nc3 Bb4 4. e3 0-0 5. Bd2 d5 6. a3 Be7 7. Nf3 c5 8. dxc5 Bxc5 9. Qc2 dxc4 10. Bxc4 Nbd7 11. Rd1 Be7 12. Ng5 (diagram) h6 13. h4 Qc7 14. Be2 Rd8 15. Rc1 Nf8 16. Nge4 Nxe4 17. Nxe4 Qxc2 18. Rxc2 Bd7 19. Bb4 Bxb4+ 20. axb4 Bc6 21. Nc5 Bxg2 22. Rg1 Bd5 23. e4 Bc6 24. b5 Be8 25. Nxb7 Rd4 26. Rc4 Rd7 27. Nc5 Rc7 28. Rc3 Rac8 29. b4 Nd7 30. Rcg3 Nxc5 31. bxc5 Rxc5 32. Rxg7+ Kf8 33. Bd3 Rd8 34. Ke2 Rc3 35. Rg8+ Ke7 36. R1g3 e5 37. Rh8 Rd6 38. b6 Rxb6 39. Rxe8+ Kxe8 40. Bb5+ Rxb5 41. Rxc3 Kd7 42. Rf3 Ke7 43. Rc3 a5 44. Rc7+ Kf6 45. Rc6+ Kg7 46. Ra6 Rb2+ 47. Kf3 Ra2 48. Kg3 h5 49. Ra8 Ra1 50. Kg2 a4 51. Ra5 f6 52. Kf3 a3 53. Ra6 Kf7 54. Ke3 Ke8 55. Ke2 Ke7 56. Kf3 Ra2 57. Ke3 Ra1 58. Ke2 Kf7 59. Kf3 Ra2 60. Ke3 Ke7 61. Kf3 Kd7 62. Rxf6 Rb2 63. Ra6 Rb3+ 64. Kg2 Kc7 65. f4 exf4 66. e5 Kb7 67. Ra4 Kc6 68. Ra6+ Kb5 69. Ra7 Kb6 70. Ra8 Kc5 71. Ra6 Kb5 72. Ra7 Kb6 73. Ra8 Kc6 74. Ra6+ Kd7 75. Kf2 Ke7 76. Kg2 Re3 77. Kf2 Rg3 78. Kf1 Rc3 79. Kf2 Re3 80. Kg2 Kd7 81. Kf2 Kc7 82. e6 Kd8 83. Ra7 Ke8 84. Kg2 Rxe6 85. Rxa3 Rg6+ 86. Kf2 Rg4 87. Ra5 Rxh4 88. Kf3 Ke7 89. Rf5 Ke6 90. Rxf4 Rxf4+ ½–½

=== Tie-break games ===
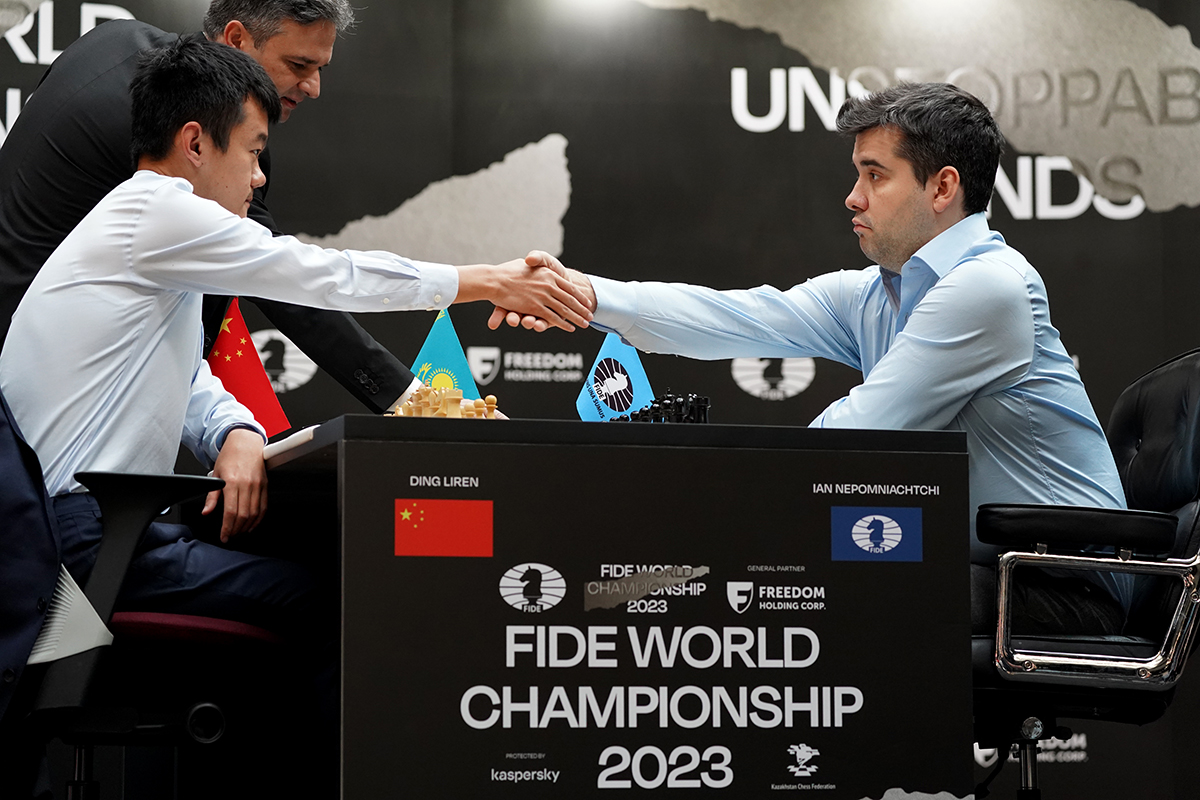
Ding (left) and Nepomniachtchi (right) during the tiebreaks of the 2023 World Chess Championship

Tie-break games were played on 30 April.

==== Game 15: Ding–Nepomniachtchi, ½–½ ====
Ding–Nepomniachtchi, game 15

Position: d8 black rook, g8 black king, a7 black pawn, c7 black queen, f7 black pawn, g7 black pawn, b6 black pawn, d6 white knight, h6 black pawn, c5 white pawn, e5 black knight, h5 black rook, e4 white pawn, g4 black bishop, a3 white pawn, c3 white rook, g3 white pawn, d2 white queen, f2 white pawn, g2 white bishop, b1 white rook, g1 white king

Position after 24...b6!!

The first game of the rapid tie-break ended in a 35-move draw. Ding avoided theory early with the move 3.c3, where the players then followed a 2019 game by Ding's second, Richard Rapport. Ding held a slight advantage for the majority of the game, but the inaccuracy 23.Rb1? returned the position to equality: 23.Rfc1! or 23.Qc2! would have been better. Soon after, Nepomniachtchi played a tactical shot that received praise from commentators, with 24...b6!! 25.cxb6 axb6!: the queen is untouchable, as after 26.Rxc7?? Nf3+ 27.Bxf3 Bxf3, mate arrives on the next move. Ding recognized this, and instead played the only move 26.Nb5!, initiating an exchange of queens. Soon after, Nepomniachtchi forced a draw by repetition on move 35.

Queen's Pawn Game (ECO D02)
1. d4 Nf6 2. Nf3 d5 3. c3 c5 4. dxc5 e6 5. Be3 Be7 6. g3 Nc6 7. Bg2 0-0 8. b4 Ng4 9. Bd4 Qc7 10. 0-0 e5 11. h3 exd4 12. hxg4 dxc3 13. Nxc3 Nxb4 14. a3 Bf6 15. Rc1 Bxc3 16. Rxc3 Nc6 17. Qxd5 Bxg4 18. Ng5 h6 19. Ne4 Rae8 20. e3 Re5 21. Qd2 Rd8 22. Nd6 Rh5 23. Rb1 Ne5 24. e4 b6 (diagram) 25. cxb6 axb6 26. Nb5 Rxd2 27. Nxc7 Bh3 28. Bxh3 Rxh3 29. Kg2 Rh5 30. Rb5 Rd1 31. Nd5 Rdh1 32. Ne7+ Kh7 33. Rxe5 R1h2+ 34. Kg1 Rh1+ 35. Kg2 ½–½

==== Game 16: Nepomniachtchi–Ding, ½–½ ====
Nepomniachtchi–Ding, game 16

Position: f8 black rook, g8 black king, f7 black pawn, g7 black pawn, h7 black pawn, c6 black pawn, a5 black pawn, c5 white rook, a4 white knight, b4 black rook, c4 white pawn, f4 black knight, d3 black pawn, h3 white pawn, b2 white pawn, c2 white pawn, f2 white pawn, g2 white pawn, a1 white rook, g1 white king

Position after 27...d3!

The second game of the rapid tie-break was a 47-move draw. For the sixth time in the match, the players returned to the Ruy Lopez. Nepomniachtchi gained a slight advantage through the opening, with Viswanathan Anand commenting that "[it] seems like White has something to work with." After 20...Nd5 by Ding (20...Bd5! was better), Nepomniachtchi allowed the game to return to equality with 21.exd6, initiating a trade of bishops: it was preferable to keep the tension with 21.Bg3!. The players simplified into an endgame of two rooks and a knight, with both players having six pawns and Nepomniachtchi holding a slight advantage. Nepomniachtchi could have maintained pressure with 27.g3, but the resulting pawn-down rook endgame would still have been holdable for Ding. He played 27.Rc5, allowing Ding to play 27...d3!, forcing the game into an equal endgame, where the players made a draw on move 47.

Ruy Lopez, Closed Defence, Martinez Variation (ECO C84)
1. e4 e5 2. Nf3 Nc6 3. Bb5 a6 4. Ba4 Nf6 5. 0-0 Be7 6. d3 b5 7. Bb3 d6 8. a4 Bd7 9. h3 0-0 10. Be3 Na5 11. Ba2 bxa4 12. Bd2 Nc6 13. Nc3 Rb8 14. Nxa4 Nd4 15. Bc4 c6 16. Nxd4 exd4 17. Bf4 Be6 18. Re1 a5 19. Qf3 Rb7 20. e5 Nd5 21. exd6 Bxd6 22. Bxd6 Qxd6 23. Qe4 Nf4 24. Qe5 Qxe5 25. Rxe5 Bxc4 26. dxc4 Rb4 27. Rc5 d3 (diagram) 28. cxd3 Nxd3 29. Rxc6 Ne5 30. Rc7 Nxc4 31. Nc5 Nxb2 32. Nd7 Re8 33. Rxa5 Nd3 34. Rg5 Rf4 35. f3 h6 36. Rd5 Nb4 37. Rd6 Rf5 38. Rb7 Rd5 39. Rdb6 Rd8 40. Nf6+ gxf6 41. Rxb4 Rd4 42. Rxd4 Rxd4 43. Kh2 Kg7 44. Rb2 Rd5 45. Ra2 Rd4 46. Rb2 Rd5 47. Ra2 Rd4 ½–½

==== Game 17: Ding–Nepomniachtchi, ½–½ ====
Ding–Nepomniachtchi, game 17

Position: d8 black rook, f8 black king, b7 white bishop, c7 white rook, e7 black bishop, f7 black pawn, g7 black pawn, h7 black pawn, e6 black pawn, a5 black pawn, f4 white pawn, b3 white pawn, a2 white pawn, e2 white pawn, f2 white pawn, h2 white pawn, g1 white king

Position after 23...a5. Although White is a pawn up, the opposite-coloured bishops mean that he has no realistic winning chances.

The third game of the rapid tie-break was a 33-move draw. Instead of 1.d4 and 1.c4, as he had previously played throughout the match, Ding began with 1.Nf3, going into a popular line that saw exchanges in the center and an even position. Nepomniachtchi forced more exchanges with the tactical 12...Nf4. Shortly after, the players liquidated into an opposite-colored bishops endgame on move 26, quickly drawing by repetition a few moves later.

English Opening, Neo-Catalan Defence Declined (ECO A14)
1. Nf3 d5 2. g3 Nf6 3. Bg2 e6 4. 0-0 Be7 5. c4 0-0 6. b3 c5 7. cxd5 Nxd5 8. Bb2 Nc6 9. d4 cxd4 10. Nxd4 Nxd4 11. Qxd4 Bf6 12. Qd2 Nf4 13. gxf4 Qxd2 14. Nxd2 Bxb2 15. Rad1 Bf6 16. Nc4 Rb8 17. Ne5 Rd8 18. Rxd8+ Bxd8 19. Rd1 Be7 20. Nd7 Bxd7 21. Rxd7 Kf8 22. Bxb7 Rd8 23. Rc7 a5 (diagram) 24. Rc4 Bb4 25. Rc2 Rd2 26. Rxd2 Bxd2 27. e3 Bb4 28. Kf1 Ke7 29. Ke2 Kd6 30. Kd3 Be1 31. Ke2 Bb4 32. Kd3 Be1 33. Ke2 ½–½

==== Game 18: Nepomniachtchi–Ding, 0–1 ====
Nepomniachtchi–Ding, game 18

Position: g7 black pawn, h7 black king, g6 black rook, h6 black pawn, a5 black pawn, c5 black pawn, b4 black bishop, e4 white queen, e3 white bishop, g3 white pawn, h3 white pawn, e2 black queen, f2 white pawn, c1 white rook, g1 white king

Position after 46...Rg6!

The fourth and final game of the rapid tie-break was a victory for Ding Liren, resulting in him winning the world championship. In another Ruy Lopez, Nepomniachtchi chose the "unusual" 13.Bb1!?, with both players making moves that appeared to indicate they were playing for a decisive game. The game quickly simplified into an endgame of queens, rooks, bishops, and pawns, with Nepomniachtchi having an extra pawn. Nepomniachtchi built a slight advantage, but a mistake, 35.Ra1?, allowed Ding to regain a pawn and return the game to equality. Two moves after Ding's brilliancy 42...Qe2!!, Nepomniachtchi gave Ding a chance to accept a draw by repetition; but after 44.Qe4+ Kg8 45.Qd5+ Kh7 46.Qe4+, instead of the anticipated 46...Kg8, Ding, who himself had gained an extra pawn in the meantime, instead signalled his intention to play for a win with the surprising 46...Rg6!, pinning his own rook, a move praised for its "boldness" by the commentators. From this point onwards, both players were under severe time pressure, with both clocks dropping to less than 60 seconds left. Nepomniachtchi responded inaccurately with 47.Qf5?! (47.h4 or 47.Rc2 would have held), allowing 47...c4!. After Nepomniachtchi played 48.h4?, Ding played the winning move 48...Qd3! in just two seconds. Engine analysis showed that the only move for Nepomniachtchi that would have held the draw was 48.Qf4!, a move Rafael Leitão described as "totally not human". After 49...Rf6? and 53...Rd6? by Ding, Nepomniachtchi exchanged rooks and brought the game back to near equality. However, Nepomniachtchi erred again with 59.Qc7? (moves that would have drawn were 59.h5 to control the g6-square, or 59.Bxg7! Kxg7 60.Qc7+ with a perpetual check), after which Ding found the winning move 59...Qg6. The final precise move from Ding was 62...h5! capitalizing on Nepomniachtchi's mistake 62.Kg2?. After 67...a2, Nepomniachtchi knocked some captured pieces onto the floor as his hands visibly trembled while searching for a move, clearly distraught; he resigned after one more move with less than 30 seconds on his clock.

Ruy Lopez, Closed Defence, Martinez Variation (ECO C84)
1. e4 e5 2. Nf3 Nc6 3. Bb5 a6 4. Ba4 Nf6 5. 0-0 Be7 6. d3 b5 7. Bb3 d6 8. a4 Bd7 9. h3 0-0 10. Be3 Na5 11. Ba2 bxa4 12. Nc3 Rb8 13. Bb1 Qe8 14. b3 c5 15. Nxa4 Nc6 16. Nc3 a5 17. Nd2 Be6 18. Nc4 d5 19. exd5 Nxd5 20. Bd2 Nxc3 21. Bxc3 Bxc4 22. bxc4 Bd8 23. Bd2 Bc7 24. c3 f5 25. Re1 Rd8 26. Ra2 Qg6 27. Qe2 Qd6 28. g3 Rde8 29. Qf3 e4 30. dxe4 Ne5 31. Qg2 Nd3 32. Bxd3 Qxd3 33. exf5 Rxe1+ 34. Bxe1 Qxc4 35. Ra1 Rxf5 36. Bd2 h6 37. Qc6 Rf7 38. Re1 Kh7 39. Be3 Be5 40. Qe8 Bxc3 41. Rc1 Rf6 42. Qd7 Qe2 43. Qd5 Bb4 44. Qe4+ Kg8 45. Qd5+ Kh7 46. Qe4+ Rg6 (diagram) 47. Qf5 c4 48. h4 Qd3 49. Qf3 Rf6 50. Qg4 c3 51. Rd1 Qg6 52. Qc8 Rc6 53. Qa8 Rd6 54. Rxd6 Qxd6 55. Qe4+ Qg6 56. Qc4 Qb1+ 57. Kh2 a4 58. Bd4 a3 59. Qc7 Qg6 60. Qc4 c2 61. Be3 Bd6 62. Kg2 h5 63. Kf1 Be5 64. g4 hxg4 65. h5 Qf5 66. Qd5 g3 67. f4 a2 68. Qxa2 Bxf4 0–1

== Reactions ==
In the press conference immediately after winning the title, Ding reflected on the journey involved in becoming a World Champion. He said:

I started to learn chess from four years old… I spent 26 years playing, analyzing, trying to improve my chess ability with many different ways, with different changing methods. With many new ways of training. I think I did everything. Sometimes I thought I was addicted to chess, because sometimes without tournaments, I was not so happy. Sometimes I struggled to find other hobbies to make me happy. This match reflects the deepness of my soul. I could not control my mood. I will cry. I will burst into tears. It was quite a tough tournament for me. I feel quite relieved.

During the press conference, Nepomniachtchi expressed regret over his play, especially in the classical portion of the match. He said:

I guess I had a chance and many promising positions. Probably I should have tried to finish everything in the classical portion, because it was a matter of one or two precise moves. Today I should have used my advantage in the second game more carefully. There was a great position. And the fourth game was very difficult; Black had the initiative. But it happens. We both had little time. I could not imagine that this position could be lost, but as it turned out, it can.

Former world champion Viswanathan Anand, who commentated during the event, said that it is impossible to praise both players enough, highlighting their energy and noting the final game as especially draining.

Former world champion Magnus Carlsen, who abdicated the World Chess Championship title before the match had taken place, congratulated Ding on Twitter by simply remarking: "Self-pinning for immortality. Congrats Ding!" It was a reference to Ding's move 46...Rg6, which voluntarily pinned his rook to his king.

Former world champion Vladimir Kramnik, who served as a consultant for Nepomniachtchi, commented that Nepomniachtchi made too many unforced errors, didn't adequately cover his own weakness, and missed too many opportunities from nervous and impulsive decision-making. However, he praised Ding's fighting spirit and the boldness of his move 46...Rg6.

Despite noting that the quality of play was below the standard of Carlsen's World Championship matches and criticizing the defensive play of the players, World No. 7 and former World Championship challenger Fabiano Caruana praised the players for their creativity, stating: "I cannot think of a world championship match this adventurous since 2006, [Veselin] Topalov and Kramnik."

Grandmaster Rafael Leitão, who analyzed the games for Chess.com, wrote that "the games had many mistakes, this is true, but both players went for the win in every game, they gave their hearts and won many fans around the world during this duel."

An analysis by economist Mehmet Ismail found that, based on average number of missed points, the match featured the lowest quality of play in a World Championship match since 2004.

Dylan Loeb McClain of The New York Times highlighted the significance of Ding's victory in his home country of China, where chess had previously been banned during the Cultural Revolution due to the game's strong presence in the Western world. With Ding's win gaining traction on Sina Weibo, McClain highlighted the importance of Ding's win as one user had mentioned Ding being the "pride of China".

McClain, along with Anand, highlighted the obstacles Ding faced on his path to becoming the World Chess Champion. Ding had become eligible for the 2022 Candidates Tournament only due to the disqualification of Sergey Karjakin, and Ding had to play many games during the COVID-19 pandemic in mainland China to meet the required number of games to qualify. Then, Ding finished as the runner-up of the Candidates Tournament, and only qualified for the championship match after Carlsen's withdrawal from the event. Finally, Ding managed to win the World Championship title despite trailing the series for the majority of the time.

Ding's path to winning the title was called "most improbable" by The Guardian.

== Aftermath ==
Ding became the 17th World Chess Champion and also became the first Chinese chess player to hold the title and, jointly with Women's World Champion Ju Wenjun, made China the holder of both the open and women's world titles.

Per regulation, Ding won €1,100,000 (55% of the prize fund) while Nepomniachtchi took home €900,000 (45%). Ding won 1.4 Elo rating points and retained his third position on the FIDE rating list, while Nepomniachtchi lost 1.4 points and remained second. On the rapid Rating lists, Ding won and Nepomniachtchi lost 1.4 Elo rating points, making them remain respectively second and seventh on the FIDE Rapid rating list.

As the runner-up, Nepomniachtchi qualified for the 2024 Candidates Tournament, an eight-player tournament to select Ding's challenger for the next World Chess Championship. Gukesh Dommaraju won the tournament and then the World Chess Championship 2024 by defeating Ding Liren.
