= The Week in Chess =

Chess news website

- Website type: Chess news
- Owner: Mark Crowther
- Creator: Mark Crowther
- Website: theweekinchess.com
- Launched: 1994

The Week in Chess (TWIC) is a chess news web site. It was founded in 1994 and is based in the United Kingdom.

TWIC has been edited by Mark Crowther since its inception in 1994. It began as a weekly Usenet posting, with "TWIC 1" being posted to Usenet group rec.games.chess on 17 September 1994. Later it moved to Crowther's personal web site, then to chesscenter.com in 1997, and in 2012 it moved to theweekinchess.com.

It contains both chess news, and all the game scores from major events.

TWIC quickly became popular with professional chess players, because it allowed them to quickly get results and game scores, where previously they had relied on print publications.

TWIC still exists as a weekly newsletter, although for important events the TWIC website is updated daily. It remains a popular site for up-to-date chess news.

Throughout its lifetime the website has been solely edited by Mark Crowther.
