= 2026 FIDE presidential election =

Upcoming election for the presidency of FIDE

2026 FIDE Presidential Election
- September 26, 2026
Nominee
Jan Henric Buettner
Wadim Rosenstein
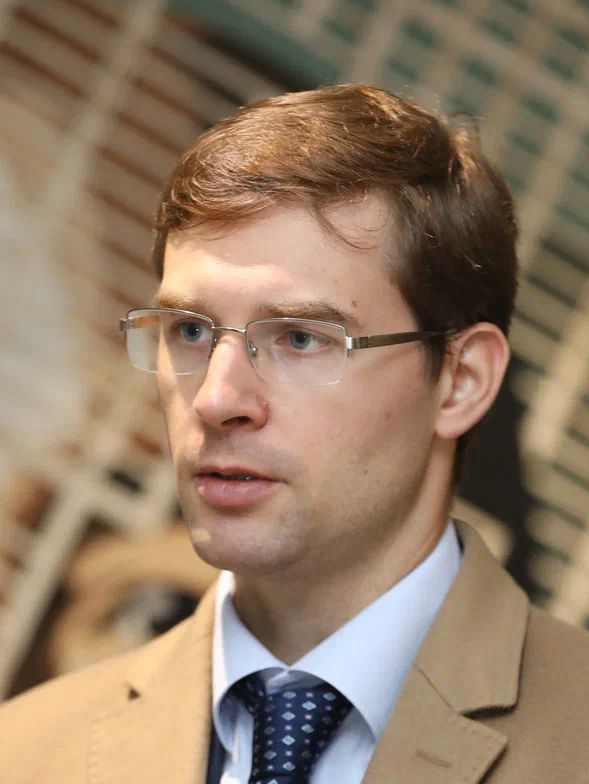
Timur Turlov
Incumbent FIDE President
Arkady Dvorkovich

The 2026 FIDE Presidential Election took place at the 91st FIDE General Assembly in September–October 2026 in Samarkand, Uzbekistan, held alongside the 46th Chess Olympiad. The election determined the presidency of the Fédération Internationale des Échecs (FIDE), the Swiss-based world governing body of chess with approximately 200 member federations, for a four-year term running to 2030. In the initial round of voting, Buettner received 20 votes, Rosenstein 76 votes and Turlov 96 votes. Turlov won in the runoff with 110 votes to 85 votes for Rosenstein.

Incumbent president Arkady Dvorkovich, a former Russian deputy prime minister who has held the role since 2018, was widely expected to seek a third consecutive term. His path to the ballot was opened in December 2023, when the FIDE General Assembly voted to remove the two-term presidential limit that Dvorkovich himself had introduced as an election promise in 2018. In July 2026, Dvorkovich announced he would "voluntarily suspend the exercise of my powers and duties" after being included on the European Union's sanction list. Viswanathan Anand then became acting FIDE President.

The election took place against a turbulent political backdrop. In February 2026, the European Commission proposed including Dvorkovich in its 20th package of sanctions against Russia, citing his connections to Russian state institutions and statements construed as supporting Russia's invasion of Ukraine. The proposal was blocked, at least temporarily, by a Hungarian veto. Meanwhile, the December 2025 FIDE General Assembly decision to restore full competitive rights to Russian and Belarusian players and national teams had fractured relations between FIDE's leadership and several major Western federations.

== Background ==
=== Dvorkovich's presidency (2018–present) ===
Arkady Dvorkovich was elected FIDE president on 3 October 2018 at the federation's General Assembly in Batumi, Georgia. He received 103 votes against 78 for Greek incumbent deputy president Georgios Makropoulos, after British grandmaster Nigel Short withdrew his candidacy at the last moment and endorsed Dvorkovich. Dvorkovich had previously served as Deputy Prime Minister of Russia under Dmitry Medvedev from 2012 to 2018 and chaired the organising committee of the 2018 FIFA World Cup. His campaign platform emphasised transparency, professional management, and democratic reform—including the introduction of presidential term limits.

He was re-elected by a large margin at the 2022 FIDE Congress in Chennai, India, receiving 157 votes to 16 for Ukrainian grandmaster Andrii Baryshpolets, one of the original complainants before the FIDE Ethics Commission. FIDE's own announcement of the result noted that Dvorkovich's second term "will also be the last", in line with the two-term limit written into the Charter he had reformed.

=== Removal of term limits (2023) ===
On 17 December 2023, at FIDE's annual online General Assembly, delegates voted 108 to 27—exceeding the required two-thirds supermajority—to remove Article 18.12 of the FIDE Charter, the clause introduced in 2020 restricting the presidency to two consecutive four-year terms. The motion was tabled by 21 mostly smaller member federations, listed on the agenda under "administrative matters" with little advance notice to the wider chess community.

Zurab Azmaiparashvili, president of the European Chess Union, spoke in favour of the motion, saying: "We have a good president who is doing a great job … Arkady is caring about chess like he is caring for a baby." The decision drew immediate criticism from prominent grandmasters. Levon Aronian labelled the proposal "embarrassing" on the platform X. Jacob Aagaard noted the irony of Dvorkovich breaking the promise that had been central to his 2018 campaign. U.S. Chess delegate Allen Priest argued in the assembly that "no one man is irreplaceable."

== Political context ==
=== Russia–Ukraine war and FIDE ===
Russia's full-scale invasion of Ukraine in February 2022 placed FIDE in an immediate diplomatic dilemma. The federation issued a statement condemning the invasion and barred Russia and Belarus from hosting FIDE events and from fielding national teams in team competitions. Individual Russian and Belarusian players were permitted to compete under a neutral FIDE banner, subject to strict conditions.

Dvorkovich's own stance became a source of lasting controversy. In March 2022 he initially condemned the war—drawing a furious response from United Russia lawmaker Andrey Turchak, who demanded his "immediate dismissal in disgrace." Dvorkovich subsequently posted a statement on the Skolkovo Foundation website declaring he was "sincerely proud of the courage of our soldiers" and describing EU measures as "harsh and senseless sanctions."

In June 2024, the FIDE Ethics and Disciplinary Commission (EDC) found both the Chess Federation of Russia (CFR) and Dvorkovich personally in violation of the FIDE Ethics Code. The CFR received a conditional two-year suspension from membership for organising chess events in Russian-occupied Ukrainian territories and for having internationally sanctioned individuals—including Dmitry Peskov and, until his recent replacement, Sergei Shoigu—on its Board of Trustees. Dvorkovich was issued a formal reprimand for his own membership of the CFR board and was urged to resign from it within 60 days. Both Dvorkovich and the CFR disputed the EDC's jurisdiction to issue the ruling.

The Ukrainian Chess Federation has stated that 44 Ukrainian chess players and coaches have been killed since Russia's full-scale invasion began in February 2022, and that it regards Dvorkovich's continued leadership of FIDE as incompatible with the federation's obligations to its Ukrainian members. Several Nordic federations—including those of Finland, Sweden, Norway, and Estonia—have adopted domestic policies restricting Russian-flagged players in their national competitions regardless of FIDE's December 2025 reinstatement ruling.

=== December 2025: Russian player reinstatement ===
At the FIDE General Assembly of December 2025, delegates voted to restore full competitive rights to Russian and Belarusian chess players and national teams, including the right to compete under national flags and to have anthems played at youth competitions, broadly aligning with International Olympic Committee recommendations for youth sport.

The vote was procedurally contested. The English Chess Federation (ECF) accused Dvorkovich of "multiple abuses of process" in chairing the session, alleging that he refused to permit debate on a counter-motion the ECF had tabled and that neither pro-reinstatement motion had secured a genuine majority of the 141 registered delegates. The English, Estonian, German, Norwegian, and Ukrainian chess federations subsequently filed a challenge at the Court of Arbitration for Sport (CAS) in Lausanne.

=== EU sanctions threat (2026) ===
On 10 February 2026, the European Commission proposed adding Dvorkovich to the European Union's 20th package of Russia sanctions—comprising a visa ban and asset freeze. Commission documents, leaked to EUobserver, alleged that Dvorkovich had referred to occupied Ukrainian territories as "new territories" of the Russian Federation and that his role in the CFR had facilitated tournaments in Russian-occupied regions of Ukraine, including Crimea, Donetsk, Luhansk, Zaporizhia, and Kherson.

FIDE denied the allegations. Its head of public relations, Anna Volkova, told EUobserver that FIDE had not rated events held in occupied territories during Dvorkovich's presidency.

The package was blocked by Hungary. EU diplomatic sources reported that Hungarian Foreign Minister Péter Szijjártó—who had met Dvorkovich at a FIDE event in Budapest in 2024—lobbied to remove Dvorkovich and other "sporting figures" from the package amid Budapest's broader veto of the 20th sanctions round. Analysts noted that Hungary's own national elections, expected in April 2026, and the apparent weakness of Prime Minister Viktor Orbán's government in polling, could determine whether the veto held.

Ukraine's presidential commissioner for sanctions policy, Vladyslav Vlasiuk, confirmed publicly that Dvorkovich had been included in Ukraine's own sanctions list, signed by President Volodymyr Zelenskyy on 16 February 2026, and that Ukraine had shared its list with EU partners to coordinate restrictions.

The sanctions threat drew a direct parallel with the fate of Dvorkovich's predecessor, Kirsan Ilyumzhinov, who was placed on a U.S. OFAC sanctions list in November 2015 for alleged dealings with the Syrian government. Ilyumzhinov's sanctioned status progressively impaired his ability to travel to FIDE events and conduct banking on the federation's behalf, contributing to his effective displacement in 2018. Observers noted that EU sanctions—covering 27 countries—would be considerably more operationally disruptive than the earlier U.S. action.

=== CAS ruling (March 2026) ===
On 27 March 2026, the Court of Arbitration for Sport issued a ruling in the case brought by the Ukrainian Chess Federation against the Chess Federation of Russia. The tribunal found that FIDE's existing disciplinary measures against the CFR had been insufficient and ordered the Russian federation to cease organising chess activities in annexed Ukrainian territories within 90 days or face suspension from international competition. The decision was seen as a partial vindication of the Ukrainian and Western federations' position ahead of the September election, though it did not immediately alter FIDE's broader reinstatement policy.

=== Pre-Election ===
Under FIDE Electoral Rules Art. 21.5, candidacy papers must reach FIDE by 6pm CET two months before the Samarkand Congress, placing the effective deadline in summer 2026. Three candidates were reported to be considering a run: the incumbent Dvorkovich; his predecessor Kirsan Ilyumzhinov, who was president from 1995 to 2018 and has been conducting outreach across Africa; and German chess organiser Wadim Rosenstein, who has emerged as a potential reform candidate for Western federations.

The removal of term limits in December 2023 was widely understood within the chess governance community to have been arranged in order to allow Dvorkovich to stand. His supporters pointed to substantial growth in FIDE's revenues, the integration of online chess into the federation's rating and competition structures, and robust support from developing-nation federations across Africa and Asia, which collectively hold a large share of General Assembly delegate votes. Intelligence signals tracked by World Chess as of April 2026 suggested Dvorkovich held national support from approximately 87 federations.

Kirsan Ilyumzhinov, who served as FIDE president from 1995 to 2018—the longest tenure in the federation's history—had signalled an interest in returning to the role. The key legal obstacle to his candidacy was removed in June 2025, when a Trump administration executive order lifted the OFAC sanctions that had been imposed on Ilyumzhinov in November 2015 for alleged dealings with the Syrian government. Since then, Ilyumzhinov had conducted outreach across Africa, focusing on the 54-federation African continental bloc, which is widely regarded as the decisive swing vote in any close FIDE election. His campaign had drawn on the legacy of the Chess in Schools programme, a signature initiative of his 23-year presidency. Reported tour stops have included Zambia, Zimbabwe, Kenya, and Botswana.

During his presidency of FIDE, Ilyumzhinov made repeated claims of having been abducted by aliens, drew extensive coverage for his close relationship with Vladimir Putin and other authoritarian leaders, and faced criticism over FIDE's governance and finances. He was also the leader of the Republic of Kalmykia from 1993 to 2010, where an aide was convicted of the 1998 murder of journalist Larisa Yudina.

Intelligence signals tracked by World Chess as of April 2026 placed Rosenstein's notional support at approximately 15 federations, concentrated among reform-minded European and Western members, and identify him as a candidate around whom the roughly 28 federations without an aligned candidate could coalesce. Russian commentators noted that both leading contenders have Russian backgrounds, and that a campaign built on distance from Russia would create complications for Rosenstein given his business ties there.

== Candidates ==
=== Jan Henric Buettner ===
Jan Henric Buettner is a German entrepreneur.

=== Wadim Rosenstein ===
Wadim Rosenstein (also rendered Vadim Rozenstein) is a German entrepreneur who emerged as a potential candidate representing the reform and Western-federations wing of FIDE's membership. A 34-year-old German citizen born in Ukraine, he has by his own account spent considerable time in Russia. He owns the Düsseldorf-based WR Group, whose interests span logistics, certification, engineering, and real estate; in 2025 the group acquired the Australian engineering firm INCO and took a stake in the Azerbaijani logistics operator RETEMS.

Rosenstein entered chess in September 2022, as FIDE parted with its Russian sponsors Aeroflot and Russian Railways under Western pressure. Operating under the WR Chess brand, he organised team world championships; his club team won two world titles and in 2024 added Magnus Carlsen to its roster. In the preceding year he had briefly sought the presidency of the German Chess Federation before withdrawing his candidacy. From spring 2025 he toured national federations and staged tournaments in Hong Kong, Tokyo, and Bangkok, and in March 2026 offered to relocate the Candidates Tournament from Cyprus to Germany at his own expense—an offer FIDE declined and that the chess press read as electioneering. He is also organising a United States–Uzbekistan match in Florida on 27–28 July 2026.

WR Group maintains a Russian arm, the Moscow-registered OOO "VR RUS", established in November 2018, of which 95.94% is held by the German VR Group Holding GmbH and 4.06% directly by Rosenstein, named in company filings as the ultimate beneficial owner. According to its 2024 audit, the subsidiary's revenue rose roughly 5.8-fold year on year to 660.9 million rubles. A frequently reproduced image in the Western chess press shows Rosenstein playing Sergey Karjakin in Moscow in May 2022, after the start of the invasion and weeks after FIDE's Ethics Commission had suspended Karjakin for six months.

=== Timur Turlov ===
Timur Turlov is a Russian-born Kazakhstani businessman.

=== Key swing blocs ===
The outcome of the election was expected to depend heavily on several undecided blocs. Africa's 54 federations represent the largest single continental group and are actively being lobbied by both the Dvorkovich and Ilyumzhinov camps. Nigeria alone leads a sub-bloc of approximately 12 uncommitted federations that both camps are reported to be pursuing. India, the world's fastest-growing chess nation and home to a significant share of FIDE's registered players, has not publicly aligned with any candidate, and its federation's position is described as unclear.

=== Campaign ===
Chess.com hosted a presidential debate on September 9. All three candidates participated. Early in the debate, Rosenstein disconnected and did not reappear despite several attempts by Chess.com to reconnect him.

== Previous FIDE presidential elections ==
2018 FIDE Presidential Election – Batumi, Georgia
| Candidate | Federation | Votes | % |
|---|---|---|---|
| Arkady Dvorkovich | Russia | 103 | 56.9% |
| Georgios Makropoulos | Greece | 78 | 43.1% |
| Nigel Short (withdrew) | England | — | — |
| 1 ballot declared invalid | | 1 | |

2022 FIDE Presidential Election – Chennai, India
| Candidate | Federation | Votes | % |
|---|---|---|---|
| Arkady Dvorkovich | Russia | 157 | 90.8% |
| Andrii Baryshpolets | Ukraine | 16 | 9.2% |

== Electoral procedure ==
The FIDE Congress convenes every four years, typically alongside the biennial Chess Olympiad. Each of FIDE's approximately 200 member national federations is entitled to send delegates to the General Assembly, where a presidential election is decided by secret ballot on a simple majority. A two-thirds supermajority is required only for amendments to the FIDE Charter.

Presidential candidates must submit a joint ticket with at minimum a president and a deputy president, supported by endorsement letters from between five and eight member federations spanning all four of FIDE's continental zones: Africa, Americas, Asia, and Europe. The candidacy deadline falls approximately two months before the Congress, placing it in summer 2026 for the Samarkand election. The FIDE Electoral Commission verifies eligibility, oversees ballot administration, and announces results.

Under the rules in force since the December 2023 General Assembly, there is no longer any limit on the number of consecutive terms a FIDE president may serve.

== Election ==
2026 FIDE Presidential Election – Samarkand, Uzbekistan
| Candidate | Federation | Votes | % |
|---|---|---|---|
| Jan Henric Buettner | Germany | 20 | 10.4 |
| Wadim Rosenstein | Germany | 76 | 39.6 |
| Timur Turlov | Kazakhstan | 96 | 50.0 |

As Turlov failed to gain a majority of votes, a runoff was held between Turlov and Rosenstein.

| Candidate | Federation | Votes | % |
|---|---|---|---|
| Wadim Rosenstein | Germany | 85 | 43.6 |
| Timur Turlov | Kazakhstan | 110 | 56.4 |
| 1 ballot declared invalid | | 1 | |

== Reactions ==
Rosenstein did not accept the results of the election, stating that Turlov and Pein had violated FIDE election rules.

== Sources ==
- Emelianova, Maria (4 October 2018). "Dvorkovich Elected FIDE President". Chess.com.
- "Dvorkovich Re-elected FIDE President". Chess.com. 7 August 2022.
- "FIDE Formally Scraps Presidential Term Limits". Chess.com. 17 December 2023.
- "Could FIDE's Russian President Get A Third Term In Office?". Chess.com. 15 December 2023.
- Doggers, Peter (6 August 2024). "Conditional Ban For Russian Federation, Dvorkovich Reprimanded By Ethics Commission". Chess.com.
- "Kirsan Ilyumzhinov, Alien Abductee, Wants To Run For FIDE President Again". Chess.com. 30 March 2026.
- Rettman, Andrew (17 February 2026). "EU travel ban could see Russia's world chess head challenged for top role". EUobserver.
- Rettman, Andrew (28 February 2026). "EU sanctions? The two faces of Russia's FIDE world-chess boss". EUobserver.
- "FIDE condemns Russian invasion of Ukraine". ChessBase. February 2022.
- "FIDE Ethics Commission suspends Russian Chess Federation and reprimands FIDE President". ChessBase. 10 June 2024.
- "FIDE General Assembly votes to lift sanctions against Russia and Belarus". ChessBase. 15 December 2025.
- "ECF protests FIDE lifting of sanctions". ChessBase. 23 December 2025.
- "Court of Arbitration for Sport finds FIDE sanctions insufficient, imposes new measures on Russian Federation". ChessBase. 27 March 2026.
- Ganeev, Timur (12 June 2026). "Another candidate for the FIDE presidency—and also with a Russian trail" [На пост президента ФИДЕ — еще один кандидат. И тоже с российским следом]. Sport-Express (in Russian).
- "Former Russian Deputy PM Dvorkovich Wins World Chess Federation Election". Radio Free Europe/Radio Liberty. 3 October 2018.
- "Dvorkovich condemns Russia's invasion, then walks it back". Reuters. March 2022.
- "FIDE calls for election candidates, Fumey to challenge Dvorkovich for Presidency". InsideTheGames. 10 May 2022.
- "Is FIDE President Arkady Dvorkovich About To Be Sanctioned?". World Chess. 25 February 2026.
- "FIDE Election 2026: Pre-Declaration Tracker". World Chess. April 2026.
- "New sanctions showdown? EU weighing action against chess federation president Dvorkovich". RBC-Ukraine. 18 February 2026.
