= Makropoulos =

Makropoulos (Greek: Μακρόπουλος) is a Greek surname, its female form is Makropoulou. Notable people with the surname include:

- Georgiann Makropoulos (1943–2010), American wrestling historian and author
- Georgios Makropoulos (born 1953), Greek chess master and chess official
- Marina Makropoulou

== See also ==
- The Makropulos Affair
