= Ruslan Tymofieiev =

- Born: June 3, 1991 (age 35); Makiivka, Ukraine
- Citizenship: Ukrainian
- Education: Yaroslav Mudryi National Law University
- Occupations: Entrepreneur, investor

Ruslan Tymofieiev (born 3 June 1991) is a Ukrainian entrepreneur and investor. He is the founder and managing partner of Adventures Lab, founder of the venture builder CLUST, and initiator of the CLUST Space shelter project.

He is an author for Kyiv Post, European Business Review, and speaker on business, startups, social investment and venture building.

== Early life and education ==
Ruslan Tymofieiev was born on 3 June 1991 in Makiivka, Donetsk Oblast, Ukraine. He studied at Vasyl Stus Donetsk National University, and graduated with a degree in law from Yaroslav Mudryi National Law University in Kharkiv.

== Career ==
At the age of 18, while studying at university, Tymofieiev began working in digital marketing, producing content on personal development and entrepreneurship for social media. In 2013, he co-founded the CPA affiliate network Everad, operating in the Health and Beauty sector.

In 2019, he co-founded, together with partners, the venture capital fund Adventures Lab, focused on pre-seed and seed-stage IT investments in Eastern Europe. As the founder and managing partner of Adventures Lab, Tymofieiev is an investor in the Ukrainian startup Reface. The fund's total investments exceed US$15 million.

In 2022, he founded the venture builder CLUST, which develops Ukrainian IT businesses and supports their entry into markets in Europe, Asia, the United States and Latin America.

In the same year, Tymofieiev initiated the CLUST SPACE project, a corporate social responsibility initiative focused on the construction of “smart shelters” for students during the Russian invasion of Ukraine. The first shelter was completed in January 2024 at the Scientific and Technical Library of Igor Sikorsky Kyiv Polytechnic Institute (KPI); students of the Kyiv National University of Construction and Architecture were involved in its design. The project was supported by the Ministry of Education and Science of Ukraine, the State Emergency Service of Ukraine and the Kyiv City State Administration with funding from Freedom Holding and the Usyk Foundation.

In 2025, a second CLUST SPACE shelter was built for students of Oles Honchar Dnipro National University. In May 2025, the project received a Red Dot Design Award.

== See also ==
- State Emergency Service of Ukraine
- Oles Honchar Dnipro National University
- Ministry of Education and Science of Ukraine
- Kyiv Polytechnic Institute
