= Zerich Capital Management =

Zerik Capital Management
- Company type: Private company
- Industry: Finance and Insurance
- Founded: 1993
- Defunct: 2021
- Fate: Acquired and renamed
- Successor: Tsifra
- Headquarters: Moscow, Russia
- Key people: Alexander Stheglov, CEO
- Products: Investment Banking, stock broker, investment
- Parent: Freedom Finance
- Website: www.zerich.ru www.zerich.com

Zerich Capital Management (Russian: Церих Кэпитал Менеджмент) was a Russian investment and financial service company. It was one of the oldest and largest financial companies in Russia. It was acquired by Freedom Finance in June 2021. In 2023 Freedom Finance Russian business changed its name to Tsifra or Cifra Broker.

Prior to its acquisition the Moscow Exchange in 2018 said the company was one of the five largest stock brokers in its derivatives market in Russia. The core divisions were: securities sales and trading, investment banking, and asset management.

== History ==
Zerich Capital Management (ZCM) was the successor to Trust-service Investing Company that was set up in 1993, at the very beginning of the establishment of the stock market in Russia.

In June 2020, Kazakhstani investment conglomerate, Freedom Holding, acquired Zerich Capital Management after it was approved by the Federal Antimonopoly Service of Russia. Freedom said it would integrate the business into its existing Russian holdings.

For 2020, Vladimir Nefedov was the majority shareholder.

== Company Structure ==
Zerich Financial Group consisted of:

- Zerich Investment Company - that provided a full range of financial services run through a Russia-based broker-dealer center including brokerage, on-line trading, desk trading etc.
- Zerich Asset Management - a complex domestic fund and wealth management services
- Zerich Bank - a credit institution
- Zerich Analytics - a capital market advisory
- Zerich Securities - a broker with a Cyprus license, which was sold to third-party investors in 2021, was subsequently rebranded with a name change to Mind-Money.eu
