= Maria Albuleț =

Romanian chess player

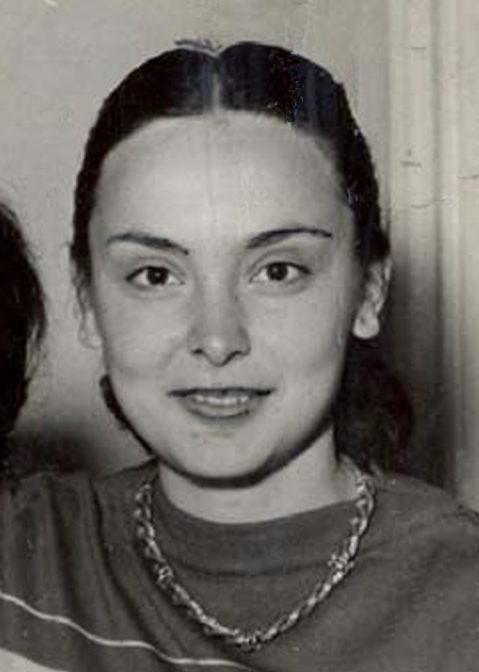
- Albulet in 1957

Personal information
- Born: June 10, 1932 Brăila, Romania
- Died: January 17, 2005 (aged 72) Ploiești, Romania

Chess career
- Country: Romania
- Title: Woman Grandmaster (1985)
- Peak rating: 2120 (July 1973)

Maria Albuleț (10 June 1932 – 17 January 2005), also Maria Pogorevici and Maria Albuleț-Pogorevici, was a Romanian doctor and chess player who held the FIDE title of Woman Grandmaster (WGM) since 1985. She was a three-time winner of the Romanian Women's Chess Championship (1951, 1955, 1956).

== Biography ==
In the 1950s she became one of the leading Romanian women chess players. She won six medals in the Romanian Women's Chess Championship: three gold (1951, 1955, 1956), two silver (1953, 1972) and bronze (1958). In 1959, she participated in the Women's World Chess Championship Candidates Tournament in Plovdiv, where she shared 12th-13th place.

Albuleț played for Romania in the Women's Chess Olympiads:

- In 1957, at first board in the 1st Chess Olympiad (women) in Emmen (+6, =5, -3) and won the team a silver medal.

In 1957, she was the first Romanian to be awarded the FIDE International Women Master (WIM) title, and in 1985 she received the honorary title of FIDE Woman Grandmaster (WGM). In 1982, her daughter Marina Makropoulou became the first Romanian to win the Woman Grandmaster title, representing Romania in the 1982 Women's Chess Olympiad winning the team silver medal, similarly to Maria's success in 1957 and furthermore winning an individual bronze medal.

Maria and Marina are one of the most successful mother-daughter duets in chess history. Both reaching top 20 in the World, both winning Chess Olympiad medals, both WGM and having won overall 13 Individual National Championships - Maria with three Romanian Championships (1951, 1955 and 1956) Marina with one Romanian and nine Greek Championships (1984, 1990, 1994, 1996, 1998, 1999, 2004, 2007, 2011, 2022). Taking into account her son-in-law Georgios Makropoulos who won seven Greek Championships, the Albuleț-Makropoulos family is one of the most successful chess families with 20 Individual National Championships overall.

Albuleț was also known as a correspondence chess player. She took part in the Women's Correspondence Chess Olympiad (1974-1979), where the Romanian team took 6th place.

An annual chess tournament is held in her memory in Braila, Romania.
