= Argentine Chess Federation =

National organisation for chess

The Argentine Chess Federation (Spanish: Federación Argentina de Ajedrez – FADA) is the national organisation for chess in Argentina. It is affiliated with the World Chess Federation. Its headquarters are in Buenos Aires.

The Argentine Chess Federation organizes an Argentine Chess Championship (Campeonato de Argentina de Ajedrez). It was founded in 1928. The current president is Mario Petrucci.

== Administration ==
=== Board ===
The board consists of a president, two vice presidents, a secretary, and a treasurer. The president and the vice presidents are elected for a 3-year term.

==== Current composition ====
- president: Jimmy Wilding
- first vice president: Raúl Bittel
- second vice president: Juan Pablo Seminara
- secretary: Arthur Rongen
- treasurer: Michiel Bosnan

== Argentine chess players ==
- Pablo Zarnicki
- Hermann Pilnik
- Augusto de Muro, president of the Argentine Chess Federation
- Raúl Bittel, vice president of the Argentine Chess Federation
