= FIDE =

International chess governing body

International Chess Federation
- Fédération Internationale des Échecs
- Abbreviation: FIDE
- Formation: July 20, 1924; 102 years ago in Paris, France
- Founder: Pierre Vincent
- Type: International organization
- Headquarters: Av. de Rhodanie 54/Building B, 2nd floor, 1007 Lausanne, Switzerland
- Members: 203 national associations
- President: Timur Turlov
- Deputy President: Viswanathan Anand
- Budget: €18.853 million (2026)
- Website: www.fide.com
- Formerly called: FIE

The International Chess Federation or World Chess Federation, commonly referred to by its French acronym FIDE (/ˈfiːdeɪ/ FEE-day, Fédération Internationale des Échecs), is an international organization based in Switzerland that connects the various national chess federations and acts as the governing body of international chess competition. FIDE was founded in Paris, France, in 1924. Its motto is Gens una sumus, Latin for 'We are one Family'. In 1999, FIDE was recognized by the International Olympic Committee (IOC). As of December 21, 2023, there are 201 member federations of FIDE.

== Role ==
FIDE's most visible activity is organizing the World Chess Championship since 1948. This championship confers the title of "World Chess Champion", which is currently held by Gukesh Dommaraju. FIDE also organizes world championships for women, juniors, seniors, and the disabled, as well as the world championships for the shorter time formats rapid and blitz. Another flagship event is the Chess Olympiad, a biennial chess tournament organized since 1924, in which national teams compete. In alternate years, FIDE also organizes the World Team Championship, in which the best teams from the previous Olympiad compete.

As part of the World Chess Championship cycle, FIDE also organizes the Candidates Tournament, which determines who will challenge the reigning World Champion, and the qualifying tournaments for the Candidates, such as the Chess World Cup, the FIDE Grand Prix, and the Grand Swiss Tournament.

FIDE is recognized by the International Olympic Committee (IOC) as the supreme body responsible for the organization of chess and its championships at global and continental levels. Other tournaments are not overseen directly by FIDE, but they generally observe FIDE rules and regulations. Some national chess organizations such as the US Chess Federation use minor differences to FIDE rules.

FIDE defines the rules of chess, both for individual games (i.e. the board and moves) and for the conduct of international competitions. The international competition rules are the basis for local competitions, although local bodies are allowed to modify these rules to a certain extent. FIDE awards a number of organizational titles, including International Arbiter, which signifies that the recipient is competent and trusted to oversee top-class competitions.

FIDE calculates the Elo ratings of players and awards titles for achievement in competitive play, such as the Grandmaster title. It also awards titles to composers and solvers of chess problems and studies.

FIDE funds and manages outreach programs, such as the Chess for Freedom program and awards such as, since 2020, the Svetozar Gligoric Award for fair play.

Correspondence chess (chess played by post, email or on online servers) is regulated by the International Correspondence Chess Federation, an independent body that cooperates with FIDE where appropriate.

The FIDE budget for 2022 was €12.84 million, an increase from the 2021 budget which was €4 million. Income is primarily from rights to tournaments such as the Olympiad and World Championship, from various fees and commissions, and from corporate sponsorship and donations.

== Regions ==
Regions of FIDE are as follows:

=== Continental ===
1. European Chess Union (ECU) – 1985
2. Asian Chess Federation (ACF)
3. African Chess Confederation (ACC)
4. Confederation of Chess for Americas (CCA)
5. Oceania Chess Confederation (OCC)

=== Affiliated organizations ===
1. African Chess Confederation (ACC)
2. Arab Chess Federation (ACF)
3. ASEAN Chess Confederation
4. Asian Chess Federation
5. Balkan Chess Federation (BCF)
6. Chess Association of Black Sea Countries
7. Commonwealth Chess Association
8. Confederation of Chess for Americas (CCA)
9. European Chess Union (ECU)
10. Francophone Chess Association (AIDEF)
11. Iberoamerican Chess Federation (FIBDA)
12. International Braille Chess Association (IBCA)
13. International Chess Committee of the Deaf (ICCD)
14. International Computer Games Association (ICGA)
15. International Correspondence Chess Federation (ICCF)
16. International Physically Disabled Chess Association (IPCA)
17. International School Chess Union
18. Isle of Man Chess Association *Affiliated member
19. Mediterranean Chess Association (MCA)
20. MITROPA Chess Association
21. New Caledonia Chess Federation (LENC) *Affiliated member
22. Oceania Chess Confederation (OCC)
23. Portuguese-speaking Federations Association
24. Small Nations Chess Association
25. South Asian Chess Council (SACC)
26. World Federation for Chess Composition (WFCC)

== Tournaments ==
- World Chess Championship
- Women's World Chess Championship
- Chess World Cup
- Women's Chess World Cup
- Chess Olympiad
- FIDE Grand Prix
- World Amateur Chess Championship

== History ==
=== Foundation and early years (up to 1939) ===
In 1904, L'union Amicale, a French chess association, attempted to establish an international chess federation. In April 1914, an initiative was taken in St. Petersburg, Russia, to form an international chess federation. Another attempt was made in July 1914 during the Mannheim International Chess Tournament. Further efforts temporarily came to an end as a result of the outbreak of World War I. In 1920, another attempt to organize an international federation was made at the Gothenburg Tournament.

Players made the first attempt to produce rules for world championship matches—in 1922, world champion José Raúl Capablanca proposed the "London rules": the first player to win six games outright would win the match; playing sessions would be limited to five hours; the time limit would be 40 moves in 2.5 hours each; the champion would be obliged to defend his title within one year of receiving a challenge from a recognized master; the champion would decide the date of the match; the champion was not obliged to accept a challenge for a purse of less than $10,000 (equivalent to $192,000 in 2025); 20% of the purse was to be paid to the title holder, with the remainder being divided, 60 percent to the winner of the match, and 40% to the loser; the highest purse bid must be accepted. Alexander Alekhine, Efim Bogoljubow, Géza Maróczy, Richard Réti, Akiba Rubinstein, Savielly Tartakower and Milan Vidmar promptly signed them. The only match played under those rules was Capablanca vs Alekhine in 1927.

In 1922, the Russian master Eugene Znosko-Borovsky, while participating in an international tournament in London, announced that a tournament would be held during the 8th Sports Olympic Games in Paris in 1924 and would be hosted by the French Chess Federation. On July 20, 1924, the participants at the Paris tournament founded FIDE as a kind of players' union. In its early years, FIDE had little power, and it was poorly financed.

FIDE's congresses in 1925 and 1926 expressed a desire to become involved in managing the world championship. FIDE was largely happy with the "London Rules", but claimed that the requirement for a purse of $10,000 was impracticable and called upon Capablanca to come to an agreement with the leading masters to revise the Rules.

FIDE's third congress, in Budapest in 1926, also decided to organize a Chess Olympiad. The invitations were, however, late in being sent, with the result that only four countries participated, and the competition was called the Little Olympiad. The winner was Hungary, followed by Yugoslavia, Romania, and Germany. In 1927, FIDE began organizing the First Chess Olympiad during its 4th Congress in London. The official title of the tournament was the "Tournament of Nations", or "World Team Championship", but "Chess Olympiad" became a more popular title. The event was won by Hungary, with 16 teams competing.

In 1928, FIDE recognized Bogoljubow as "Champion of FIDE" after he won a match against Max Euwe. Alekhine, the reigning world champion, attended part of the 1928 Congress and agreed to place future matches for the world title under the auspices of FIDE, although any match with Capablanca should be under the same conditions as in Buenos Aires, 1927, i.e., including the requirement for a purse of at least $10,000. FIDE accepted this and decided to form a commission to modify the London Rules for future matches, though this commission never met; by the time of the 1929 Congress, a world championship match between Alekhine and Bogoljubow was under way, held neither under the auspices of FIDE nor in accordance with the London Rules.

While negotiating his 1937 World Championship re-match with Alekhine, Euwe proposed that if he retained the title, FIDE should manage the nomination of future challengers and the conduct of championship matches. FIDE had been trying since 1935 to introduce rules on how to select challengers, and its various proposals favored selection by some sort of committee. While they were debating procedures in 1937 and Alekhine and Euwe were preparing for their re-match later that year, the Dutch Chess Federation proposed that a super-tournament (AVRO) of ex-champions and rising stars should be held to select the next challenger. FIDE rejected this proposal and at their second attempt nominated Salo Flohr as the official challenger. Euwe then declared that: if he retained his title against Alekhine he was prepared to meet Flohr in 1940 but he reserved the right to arrange a title match either in 1938 or 1939 with José Raúl Capablanca, who had lost the title to Alekhine in 1927; if Euwe lost his title to Capablanca then FIDE's decision should be followed and Capablanca would have to play Flohr in 1940. Most chess writers and players strongly supported the Dutch super-tournament proposal and opposed the committee processes favored by FIDE. While this confusion went unresolved: Euwe lost his title to Alekhine; the AVRO tournament in 1938 was won by Paul Keres under a tie-breaking rule, with Reuben Fine placed second and Capablanca and Flohr in the bottom places; and the outbreak of World War II in 1939 cut short the controversy. Although competitive chess continued in many countries, including some that were under Nazi occupation, there was no international competition and FIDE was inactive during the war.

=== 1946 to 1993 ===
==== Birth of the World Championship challenge cycle ====
From the time of Emanuel Lasker's defeat of Wilhelm Steinitz in 1894, until 1946, a new World Champion had won the title by defeating the former champion in a match. Alexander Alekhine's death created an interregnum that made the normal procedure impossible. The situation was confused, with many respected players and commentators offering different solutions. FIDE found it difficult to organize the early discussions on how to resolve the interregnum, because problems with money and travel in the aftermath of World War II prevented many countries from sending representatives, most notably the Soviet Union. The shortage of clear information resulted in otherwise responsible magazines publishing rumors and speculation, which only made the situation more confused. See Interregnum of World Chess Champions for more details.

This situation was exacerbated by the Soviet Union having long refused to join FIDE, and by this time it was clear that about half the credible contenders were Soviet citizens. The Soviet Union realized, however, it could not afford to be left out of the discussions regarding the vacant world championship, and in 1947 sent a telegram apologizing for the absence of Soviet representatives and requesting that the USSR be represented in future FIDE Committees.

The eventual solution was similar to FIDE's initial proposal and to a proposal put forward by the Soviet Union (authored by Mikhail Botvinnik). The 1938 AVRO tournament was used as the basis for the 1948 Championship Tournament. The AVRO tournament had brought together the eight players who were, by general acclamation, the best players in the world at the time. Two of the participants at AVRO—Alekhine and former world champion Capablanca—had since died; but FIDE decided that the other six participants at AVRO would play a quadruple round-robin tournament. These players were: Max Euwe (from The Netherlands); Botvinnik, Paul Keres and Salo Flohr (from the Soviet Union); and Reuben Fine and Samuel Reshevsky (from the United States). FIDE soon accepted a Soviet request to substitute Vasily Smyslov for Flohr, and Fine withdrew in order to continue his degree studies in psychiatry, so five players competed, in a quintuple round robin. Botvinnik won, thus becoming world champion, ending the interregnum.

The proposals which led to the 1948 Championship Tournament also specified the procedure by which challengers for the World Championship would be selected in a three-year cycle: countries affiliated with FIDE would send players to Zonal tournaments (the number varied depending on the number of strong players each country had); the players who gained the top places in these would compete in an Interzonal tournament (later split into two, then three tournaments as the number of countries and eligible players increased); the highest-placed players from the Interzonal would compete in the Candidates Tournament, along with the loser of the previous title match and the runner-up in the previous Candidates Tournament; and the winner of the Candidates played a title match against the champion. From 1950 until 1962 inclusive, the Candidates Tournament was a multi-round round-robin—how and why it was changed are described below.

==== Bobby Fischer controversies ====
FIDE found itself embroiled in some controversies relating to the American player Bobby Fischer. The first controversy took place when Fischer alleged that, at the 1962 Candidates Tournament in Curaçao, the Soviet players Tigran Petrosian, Paul Keres and Efim Geller had pre-arranged draws in their games played amongst themselves, and that Viktor Korchnoi, another Soviet player, had been instructed to lose to them (Fischer had placed 4th, well behind Petrosian, Keres and Geller). Grandmaster Yuri Averbakh, a member of the Soviet delegation at the tournament, confirmed in 2002 that Petrosian, Keres and Geller privately agreed to draw their games. FIDE responded by changing the format of Candidates Tournaments from a multi-round round-robin to a series of elimination matches, initially 10–12 games in duration; however, by the 1970s, the Candidates final would be as long as 24 games.

Then, in 1969, Fischer refused to play in the U.S. Championship because of disagreements about the tournament's format and prize fund. Since that event was being treated as a Zonal tournament, Fischer forfeited his right to compete for the right to challenge World Champion Boris Spassky in 1972. Grandmaster Pal Benko agreed to relinquish his qualifying place at the Interzonal in Fischer's favor, and the other participants waived their right to claim the spot. FIDE president Max Euwe interpreted the rules very flexibly to allow Fischer to play in the 1970 Interzonal at Palma de Mallorca, which he won convincingly. Fischer then crushed Mark Taimanov, Bent Larsen (both 6–0) and Tigran Petrosian in the 1971 Candidates Tournament and won the title match with Spassky to become world champion.

After winning the world championship, Fischer criticized the existing championship match format (24 games; the champion retained the title if the match was tied) on the grounds that it encouraged whoever got an early lead to play for draws. While this dispute was going on, Anatoly Karpov won the right to challenge in 1975. Fischer refused to accept any match format other than the one he proposed. Among Fischer's demands was a requirement that the challenger must beat him by at least two games in order to take his title (Fischer proposed a match format in which the first player to win 10 games wins, with draws not counting, but if the result is 9–9 it is considered a tie). The FIDE argued that it was unfair for a challenger to be able to beat the world champion, yet not take his title. Fischer would not back down, and eventually FIDE awarded the title to Karpov by default. Some commentators have questioned whether FIDE president Max Euwe did as much as he could have to prevent Fischer from forfeiting his world title.

==== Other 1970s controversies ====
FIDE had a number of conflicts with the Soviet Chess Federation. These conflicts included:

- The defection of grandmaster Gennadi Sosonko in 1972. The Soviets demanded that Sosonko be excluded from competitive chess, television or any other event that might publicize his defection. FIDE refused, and no Soviet players took part in the 1974 Wijk aan Zee tournament in The Netherlands because Sosonko was playing in it.
- In 1976 world championship contender Viktor Korchnoi sought political asylum in The Netherlands. In a discussion a few days earlier Euwe told Korchnoi, "...of course you will retain all your rights..." and later opposed Soviet efforts to prevent Korchnoi from challenging for Anatoly Karpov's title in 1978.
- FIDE decided to hold the 1976 Chess Olympiad in Israel despite the Soviet Chess Federation announced its boycott of Israel as the site of the Olympiad and the congress because of what it described as Israeli aggression against Arab states.

==== Rapid expansion of membership ====
During his period as president of FIDE (1970–1978) Max Euwe strove to increase the number of member countries, and Florencio Campomanes (president 1982–1995) continued this policy, with each member nation receiving one vote. Former world champion Anatoly Karpov later said this was a mixed blessing, as the inclusion of so many small, poor countries led to a "leadership vacuum at the head of the world of chess......" Yuri Averbakh said the presence of so many weak countries made it easy to manipulate decisions.

==== World Championship, 1983–1985 ====
The events leading to Garry Kasparov's winning the world championship involved FIDE in two controversies. While arranging the Candidates Tournament semi-final matches to be played in 1983, FIDE accepted bids to host Kasparov versus Victor Korchnoi in Pasadena, California. The Soviet Union refused to accept this, either because it feared Kasparov would defect or because it thought Kasparov was the greater threat to reigning champion Anatoly Karpov. Their refusal would have meant that Kasparov forfeited his chance of challenging for the title. FIDE president Florencio Campomanes negotiated with the Soviet Union, and the match was played in London.

In the 1984 world championship match between Karpov and Kasparov the winner was to be the first to win six games. In the first 27 games Karpov gained a 5–0 lead but by the end of the 48th Kasparov had reduced this to 5–3. At this point the match had lasted for 159 days (from September 1984 to February 1985). Then the match was ended without result by Florencio Campomanes, the President of the World Chess Federation, and a new match was announced to start a few months later. The termination was controversial, as both players stated that they preferred the match to continue. Announcing his decision at a press conference, Campomanes cited the health of the players, which had been strained by the length of the match. Kasparov won the second match and became world champion.

=== 1993 to 2018 ===
==== World Championship divided, 1993–2006 ====
In 1992, Nigel Short emerged as the official challenger for Kasparov's world title after winning the Candidates Tournament. FIDE promptly accepted a bid from Manchester, England, to host the 1993 title match, but without consulting Short, as its rules required; Short was traveling to Greece at the time. Upon learning of this, Short reached out to Kasparov, who had harbored distrust for FIDE and its president, Florencio Campomanes, since the abrupt end of his 1984 title match against Anatoly Karpov. Kasparov and Short concluded that FIDE had not secured the best financial deal for them and announced their decision to play under a new organization, the Professional Chess Association (PCA). In response, FIDE stripped Kasparov of his title, removed both Kasparov and Short from the official rating list, and announced a title match between Karpov and Jan Timman, whom Short had defeated in the Candidates Tournament. Both Kasparov and Karpov won their respective matches, both claiming the title of world champion.

By 1994, Kasparov realized that separating from FIDE had been a mistake, as the split in the world championship was unpopular among commercial sponsors and most grandmasters. He began efforts to mend relations with FIDE and supported Campomanes's re-election bid as FIDE president. But Anatoly Karpov and Bachar Kouatly opposed it. Consequently, a complex situation close to a stalemate developed in Paris in 1995. Having discussed the current situation with FIDE Central Committee member Bolat Asanov, Campomanes agreed with his advice to resign, provided his successor was Kirsan Ilyumzhinov, the president of the Republic of Kalmykia.

Several attempts to reunify the world championship in the following years failed for various reasons, including financial constraints and Kasparov's opposition to any plan requiring him to play in a qualifying series. In 2000, Vladimir Kramnik defeated Kasparov in a match for the now-renamed Braingames World Chess Championship, as the PCA had dissolved by then. Kramnik, like Kasparov, was unwilling to play in a qualifying series and strongly objected to FIDE's attempt to decide the world championship through annual knockout tournaments and to shorten game time limits.

In 2006, a reunification match was held between Kramnik and Veselin Topalov, which Kramnik won amidst a controversy that resulted in one game being awarded to Topalov. However, the split in the world title had lingering effects, as evidenced by FIDE's complex regulations for the 2007-2009 world championship cycle. FIDE decided to grant Topalov a "fast track" entry into the 2007-2009 cycle due to his inability to compete in the 2007 World Chess Championship Tournament. Additionally, FIDE decided that if Kramnik did not win the 2007 championship tournament, he would play a championship match in 2008 against the winner. This provision came into effect when Viswanathan Anand won the tournament and became the world champion.

==== IOC recognition ====
In 1999, FIDE was recognized by the International Olympic Committee (IOC). Two years later, it introduced the IOC's anti-drugs rules to chess, as part of its campaign for chess to become part of the Olympic Games.

==== Commercial agreement with Agon and World Chess ====
In 2012 FIDE entered into a commercial agreement, initially planned to last until 2021, with the company Agon Limited. This company was given rights to organize and commercially exploit the World Chess Championship and the associated events in the World Championship cycle. The first tournament it organized was the London FIDE Grand Prix event in September 2012, followed by the London Candidates Tournament in March 2013, and the Chennai World Chess Championship in November 2013.

Agon subsequently organized the four events in the FIDE Grand Prix 2014–15, the Candidates Tournament in 2014, and the World Chess Championship in 2014.

Agon had been founded in 2012 in Jersey by Andrew Paulson as the sole shareholder. On February 20, 2012, an agreement between Agon and FIDE was made, subject to approval by the 2012 FIDE General Assembly. This approval was forthcoming in September 2012. In October 2014, Agon was sold to its current CEO Ilya Merenzon for the sum of one pound. At the September 2016 FIDE General Assembly, it was resolved that Agon should institute a corporate presence in a locale with more transparency. Merenzon said that they would register in the United Kingdom within a few months. As a result, a new company, World Chess Limited, was registered shortly after, replacing Agon as the rights holder in the agreement with FIDE.

==== FIDE and Agon/World Chess contract controversy ====
Kirsan Ilyumzhinov was happy with the agreement on the basis that now FIDE itself did not have to expend resources to find organizers for its premier events. The issue of financial guarantees was also important, though as explained below, these have not always materialized. His estimation of 10–12 million euros to FIDE from the coming cycles has not yet come to fruition either.

The condition that Agon would be the sole organizer of Championship events was disputed originally by principally the Bulgarian Chess Federation, with respect to the Candidates matches for 2012. In early 2014, a purported agreement between Paulson and FIDE President Kirsan Ilyumzhinov was leaked, and then published by Chess.com (and others), which allegedly indicated that Paulson was simply a front man with Ilyumzhinov the ultimate benefactor of Agon. In that Chess.com article Malcolm Pein is quoted as having twice been told by Paulson that Ilyuzmhinov owned Agon, and in a New In Chess article Nigel Short asserted he had also been told this personally by Paulson. In response, FIDE's deputy vice president Georgios Makropoulos pointed out that the purported contract was a draft document. The FIDE Ethics Commission ruled in September 2015 that Ilyumzhinov did not violate the FIDE Code of Ethics.

=== 2018 to present ===
==== Election of Arkady Dvorkovich and the end of the Ilyumzhinov era ====
In July 2018, Kirsan Ilyumzhinov was ousted as FIDE President, after having been in office for 23 years, since 1995. Being subjected to US sanctions for his business dealings with the Syrian government, Ilyumzhinov was forced out and did not run for re-election in the 2018 FIDE elections. The Greek Georgios Makropoulos, who had been General Secretary since 1990 and number two in the organization under Kirsan's presidency, was the first to announce his ticket. He was followed by the Englishman Nigel Short, a world title contender in the World Chess Championship 1993 against Garry Kasparov. The last to announce his candidacy was Arkady Dvorkovich, an economist who had served as Russian deputy prime minister and was also a member of the supervisory board of the Russian Chess Federation. Dvorkovich was also one of the chief organizers of the 2018 FIFA World Cup. Dvorkovich was placed in the US Treasury pre-sanctions list in 2018 as a top Russian government employee.

In the elections, held in Batumi (Georgia) in October 2018, Dvorkovich won by 103 votes to 78 against Makropoulos, after Nigel Short withdrew his candidacy at the last minute and expressed his support to the Russian candidate.

After the 2018 FIDE elections and the appointment of a new FIDE President, the new management took regaining control over the World Championship cycle as one of their top priorities. In January 2019, FIDE Director-General Emil Sutovsky announced that a new contract has been signed that continues a scaled-back relationship with World Chess (formerly known as AGON) through 2021. In virtue of this new agreement, FIDE reasserted control over the 2020 Candidates and the World Championship match, which from now on will undergo an open bidding procedure. Agon/World Chess only retained organizational and commercial rights over the FIDE Grand Prix Series, limited until 2021.

At FIDE's general assembly in Chennai, India, in August 2022 Dvorkovich got re-elected by 157 votes to 16 against Ukraine's Andrey Baryshpolets.

==== Reactions to the Russian invasion of Ukraine ====
On February 27, 2022, FIDE issued an official statement condemning the Russian invasion of Ukraine. As a consequence, Russia and Belarus were forbidden from hosting official FIDE events. The decision to hold the 2022 Chess Olympiad and the 2022 FIDE congress in Moscow was also revoked. The Russian and Belarusian national teams were banned from participating in FIDE tournaments, although individual players could compete if they complied with strict regulations, in which case their federation and flag was replaced with FIDE and its banner.

On March 22, 2022, FIDE decided to issue a six-month ban from competing in rated tournaments against Russian grandmaster Sergey Karjakin. Karjakin had posted controversial statements on Twitter in which he declared his support for the invasion of Ukraine and for President Vladimir Putin's characterization of the war as a fight against Nazism. FIDE argued that Karjakin's statements had shed a negative light on chess and on the federation and found that he had violated the FIDE code of ethics. Sergei Shipov, who also publicly commented in favor of Russia, was not sanctioned, because FIDE decided that his statements were less provocative.

On July 21, 2026, FIDE announced the lifting of restrictions on the Belarusian Chess Federation, as recommended by the International Olympic Committee (IOC) in their meeting earlier in the year. The removal of restrictions allow Belarusian athletes to participate in FIDE-rated events under their national flag.

==== Policy on transgender players ====
In August 2023, FIDE ruled that transgender women would be excluded from women's tournaments organised by them, such as the Women's World Chess Championship, the Women's Chess World Cup, and qualification events for these. Additionally, they implemented rules stripping transgender men of any women's titles they might have earned while competing as women. The regulation affects those who changed their gender identity after being assigned a FIDE identification number.

The French Chess Federation announced that they would not implement any restrictions on transgender players, considering the FIDE decision transphobic. A little later, the German Chess Federation said in a statement that they do not exclude transgender women from women's tournaments, and made reference to Annemarie Sylvia Meier, a transgender woman who won the 2003 German Women's Chess Championship. They also said that no one should have to experience violence and discrimination. Similar statements were also released by the English, Finnish and US chess federations.

Since the announcement, French transgender player Yosha Iglesias has competed as a woman and been awarded the Woman International Master title.

==== Sanctions against Dvorkovich and election of Timur Turlov ====
The next FIDE presidential election was scheduled for September 2026. Preparations began in the summer. The first to announce their candidacies were Russian statesman and economist Arkady Dvorkovich (the incumbent president) and Kazakh businessman, owner of Freedom Holding, Timur Turlov, Russian-German businessperson and owner of WR Logistics, Wadim Rosenstein, and German entrepreneur Jan Henric Buettner. On July 20, Russian statesman and political figure Kirsan Ilyumzhinov, who served as FIDE President until 2018, announced his candidacy for the post of president.

In a statement made on 23 July 2026, Dvorkovich announced his voluntary suspension of his powers and duties as president of FIDE after being sanctioned by the European Union as part of the international sanctions against Russia. In his place, incumbent deputy president Viswanathan Anand was elevated by the FIDE Council to serve as the president of FIDE on an interim basis. With Turlov, Rosenstein and Buettner contesting the election held on 26 September 2026 during the 46th Chess Olympiad, Turlov defeated Rosenstein during the second round of voting by a margin of 110–85 votes to become the new president of FIDE. With Turlov's election win, his running mate Anand retained his role as deputy president.

== FIDE presidents ==
No.	Portrait	Name (Birth–Death)	Nationality	Term of office		
No.	Portrait	Name (Birth–Death)	Nationality	Took office	Left office	Time in office
1		Alexander Rueb (1882–1959)	Netherlands	1924	1939	15 years
2		Augusto de Muro (Note: In a FIDE Council meeting held in April 2023, Augusto de Muro was recognized for his appointment as president in 1939, but was noted as unable to carry out his presidential duties due to the effects of World War II.) (?–1959)	Argentina	1939	1946	7 years
3		Alexander Rueb (1882–1959)	Netherlands	1946	1949	3 years
4		Folke Rogard (1899–1973)	Sweden	1949	1970	21 years
5		Max Euwe (1901–1981)	Netherlands	1970	1978	8 years
6		Friðrik Ólafsson (1935–2025)	Iceland	1978	1982	4 years
7		Florencio Campomanes (1927–2010)	Philippines	26 September 1982	24 November 1995	13 years, 59 days
8		Kirsan Ilyumzhinov (Note: Kirsan Ilyumzhinov was suspended on 14 July 2018, after FIDE determined that he violated the organization's code of ethics and conduct. With Ilyumzhinov disputing this claim, he ultimately remained as president in a limited capacity until the election of Arkady Dvorkovich in October 2018.) (born 1962)	Russia	24 November 1995	3 October 2018	22 years, 313 days
—		Georgios Makropoulos (Note: After Kirsan Ilyumzhinov was sanctioned by the United States Department of the Treasury due to his ties with the Assad regime in Syria, Makropoulos was elected by the FIDE Presidential Board on 6 December 2015 to serve as acting president until no later than the 2018 election.) (1953–2026); Acting	Greece	6 December 2015	3 October 2018	2 years, 301 days
9		Arkady Dvorkovich (Note: Due to being placed on the list of international sanctions against Russia, Dvorkovich announced his voluntary suspension of his powers and duties as president of FIDE in a statement on 23 July 2026. Dvorkovich remained as president in a limited capacity until the election of Timur Turlov in 2026.) (born 1972)	Russia	3 October 2018	26 September 2026	7 years, 358 days
—		Viswanathan Anand (Note: Served as acting president after Arkady Dvorkovich voluntarily suspended his duties and powers as FIDE president due to being added on the list of international sanctions against Russia. Remained in the role until the 2026 FIDE presidential election held on 26 September 2026, after Turlov was elected as president.) (born 1969); Acting	India	23 July 2026	26 September 2026	65 days
10		Timur Turlov (born 1987)	Kazakhstan	26 September 2026	Incumbent	42 days

== Publications ==
- Kazic, Bozidar; Keene, Raymond; Lim, Kok Ann (1985). The Official Laws of Chess. Batsford. ISBN 0-7134-4802-4.
- FIDE (2000). The Official Laws of Chess (2nd ed.). Macmillan. ISBN 0-02-028540-X.

== See also ==
- FIDE Online Arena
- Chess around the world
- FIDE World Rankings
- International Correspondence Chess Federation
- List of FIDE chess world number ones
- FIDE titles
