= Andrey Baryshpolets =

Ukrainian chess grandmaster (born 1991)

Personal information
- Born: Andriy Vadymovych Baryshpolets; January 16, 1991 (age 35) Kyiv, Ukraine

Chess career
- Country: Ukraine
- Title: Grandmaster (2013)
- FIDE rating: 2557 (July 2026)
- Peak rating: 2609 (August 2018)

Andrey Baryshpolets or Andriy Baryshpolets (Ukrainian: Андрій Вадимович Баришполець, born January 16, 1991, Kyiv, Ukraine) was the under 18 Ukrainian champion in 2008. He was FIDE Master in 2007, International Master in 2009 and Grandmaster in 2013. He won the 13th Parsvanth International Grandmasters Chess Tournament on 16 January 2015.

In 2022, Baryshpolets ran for FIDE President alongside Peter Heine Nielsen as Deputy President, but lost to the incumbent Arkady Dvorkovich by a vote of 157 votes to 16.

== Notable tournaments ==
Tournament Name	Year	ELO	Points
St Louis Winter Classic B(Saint Louis USA)	2017	2578	6.5
10th Nabokov Mem GM(Kiev UKR)	2012	2550	6.5
