= Arkady Dvorkovich =

Russian politician, public servant and economist (born 1972)

- Аркадий Дворкович
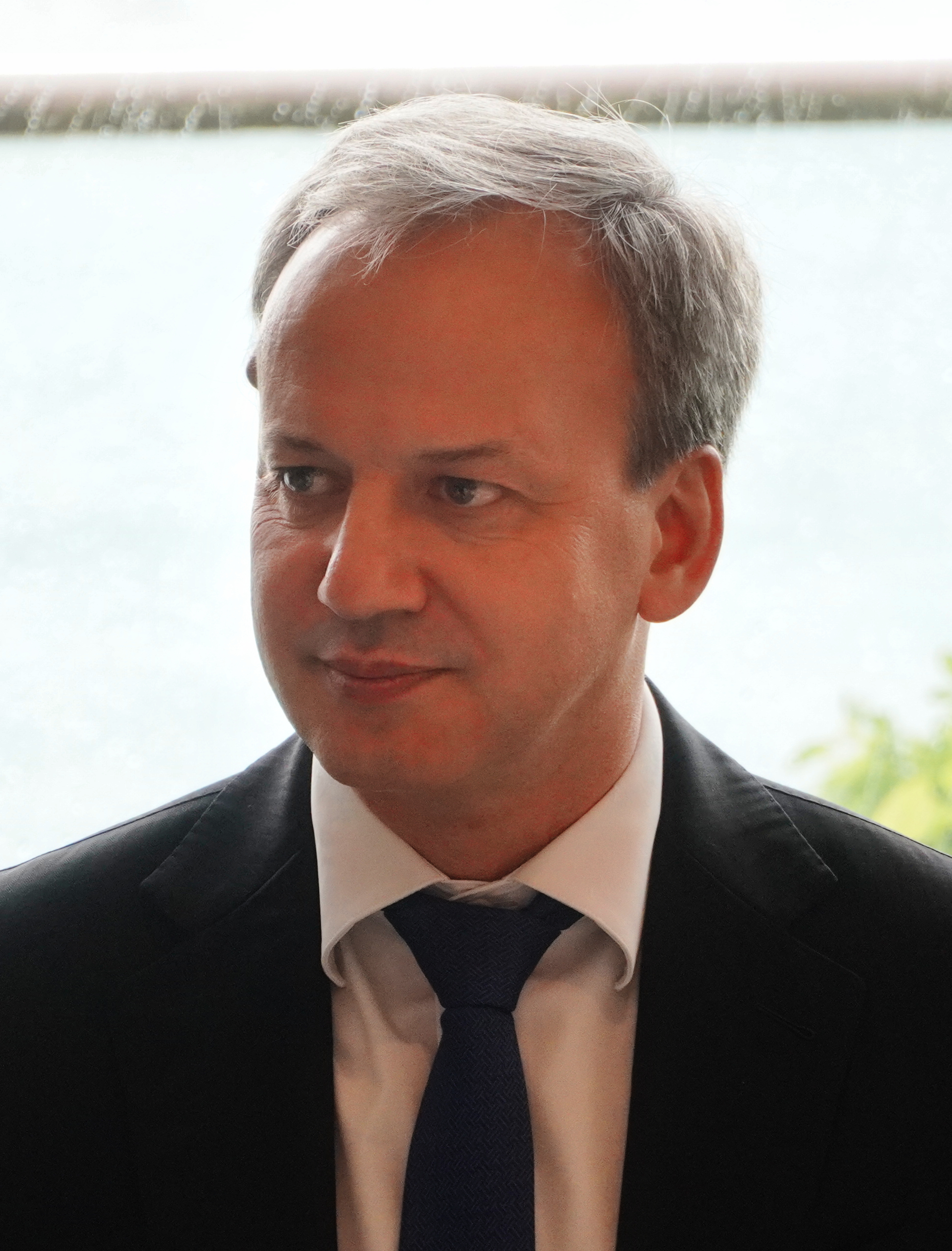
- Dvorkovich in 2026

President of FIDE
- In office 3 October 2018 – 26 September 2026 (Note: Due to being placed on the list of international sanctions against Russia, Dvorkovich announced his voluntary suspension of his powers and duties as president of FIDE in a statement on 23 July 2026. Dvorkovich remained as president in a limited capacity until the appointment of Timur Turlov during the 2026 FIDE presidential election.)
- Deputy: Bachar Kouatly; Viswanathan Anand
- Preceded by: Kirsan Ilyumzhinov
- Succeeded by: Timur Turlov (Note: Viswanathan Anand served as acting president between the date when Dvorkovich self-voluntarily suspended his duties and Turlov's assumption of office.)

Deputy Prime Minister of Russia
- In office 21 May 2012 – 7 May 2018
- Prime Minister: Dmitry Medvedev
- Preceded by: Igor Sechin
- Succeeded by: Alexey Gordeyev

Assistant to the President of the Russian Federation
- In office May 2008 – May 2012
- President: Dmitry Medvedev
- Preceded by: Unknown
- Succeeded by: Konstantin Chuychenko

Personal details
- Born: Arkady Vladimirovich Dvorkovich; 26 March 1972 (age 54) Moscow, Russian SFSR, Soviet Union
- Party: United Russia
- Education: Moscow State University; New Economic School; Duke University
- Occupation: Politician; economist

Arkady Vladimirovich Dvorkovich (Note: In this name that follows East Slavic naming customs, the patronymic is Vladimirovich and the family name is Dvorkovich.) (Russian: Арка́дий Влади́мирович Дворко́вич; born 26 March 1972) is a Russian politician and economist who served as president of the International Chess Federation (FIDE) from 3 October 2018 until 26 September 2026. Previously, he served as deputy prime minister in the first cabinet of Dmitry Medvedev from 21 May 2012 until 7 May 2018. He was previously an Assistant to the President of the Russian Federation from May 2008 to May 2012. He has the federal state civilian service rank of 1st class Active State Councillor of the Russian Federation.

Dvorkovich was considered to be a close confidant of Medvedev and an important figure in Russian politics. He rose to prominence during Medvedev's presidency but has suffered from the resurgence of Igor Sechin. From 2018 to 2022 he was the Chairman of Skolkovo Foundation. From 2015 to 2018 he was the chairman of the Board of the Directors in Russian Railways.

Dvorkovich's father, Vladimir Dvorkovich, was an international chess arbiter. Dvorkovich is an official of the Russian Chess Federation and was first elected president of FIDE in October 2018, succeeding Kirsan Ilyumzhinov. He was re-elected for a second term in the elections held on the sidelines of the 44th Chess Olympiad held in Mamallapuram, India, on 7 August 2022.

== Career ==
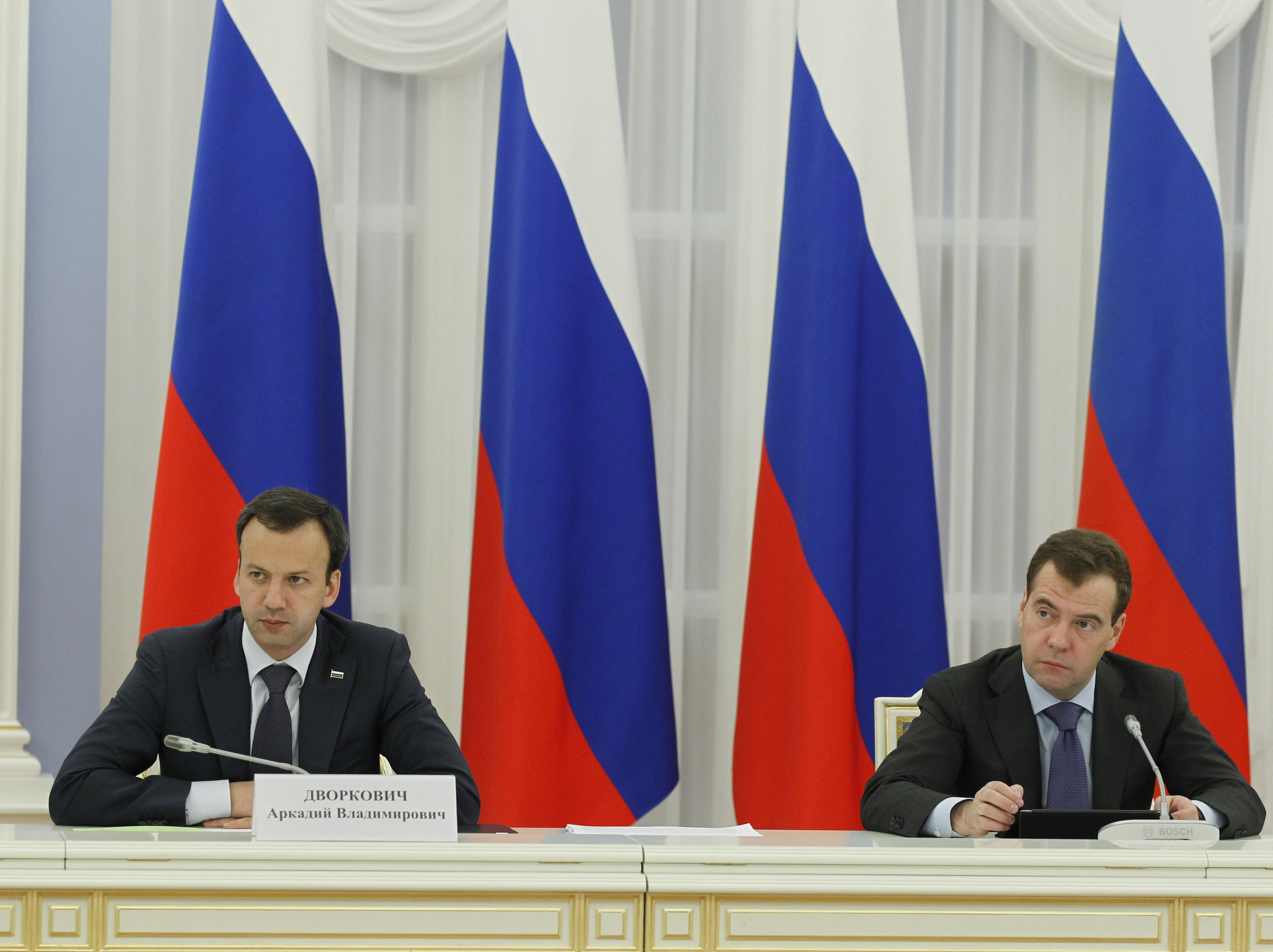
Dvorkovich with Russian Prime Minister Dmitry Medvedev, 6 June 2012

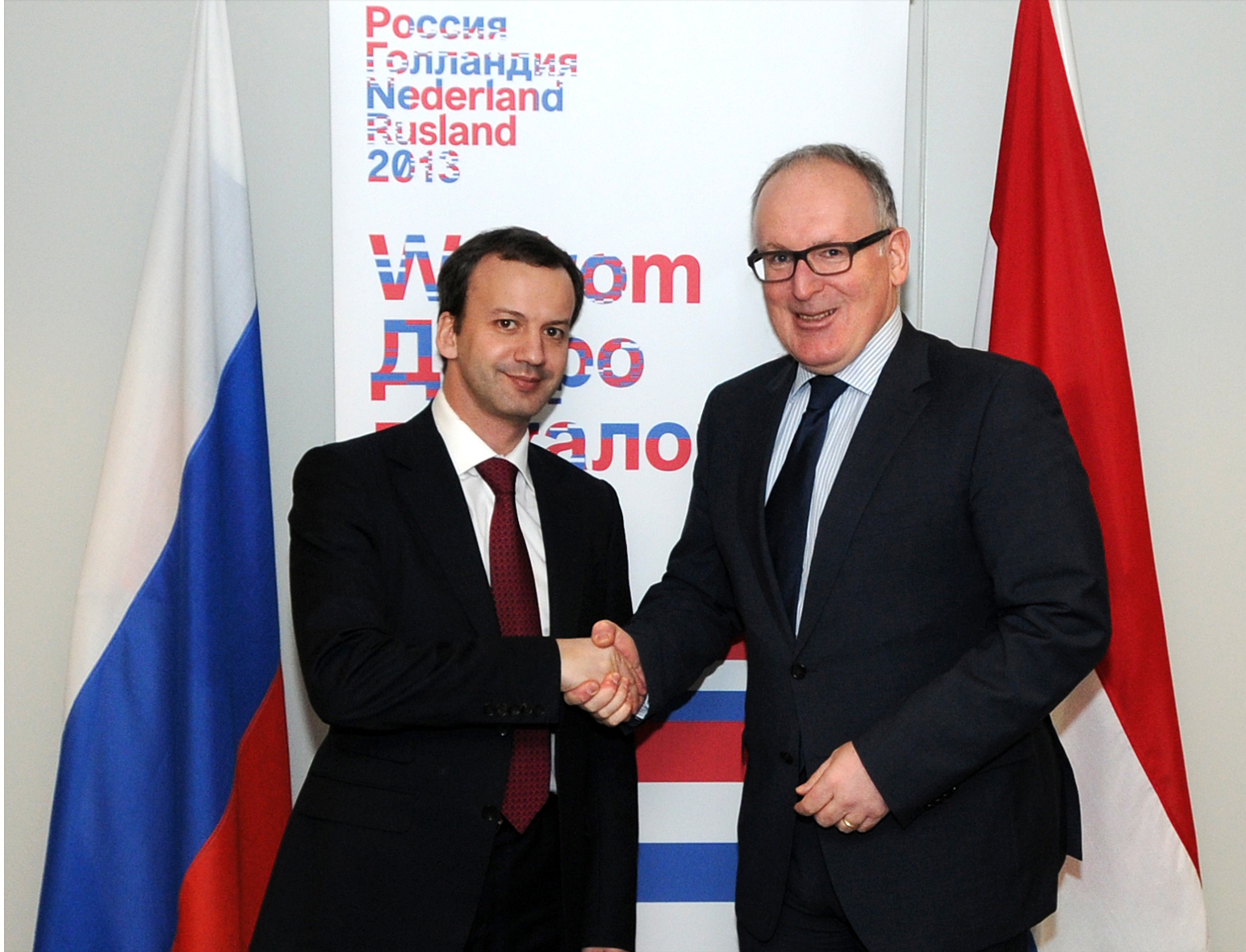
Dvorkovich with Dutch Foreign Minister Frans Timmermans, 6 March 2013

- Since 1994 – consultant, senior expert, CEO, scientific director of the Economic Expert Group of the Ministry of Finance of Russia
- Since 2000 – expert in the "Center for Strategic Research"
- Since August 2000 – adviser to the Minister for Economic Development of the Russian Federation German Gref
- Since 2001 – Deputy Minister for Economic Development of the Russian Federation
- Since April 2004 – Head of Expert Group of President of the Russian Federation
- Since 13 May 2008 – Assistant to the President of the Russian Federation
- 21 May 2012 to 7 May 2018 – Deputy Prime Minister of Russia

In 2018, he served as chairman of the 2018 FIFA World Cup Russia Local Organizing Committee, collaborating closely with FIFA President Gianni Infantino, who later praised him for his work. Subsequently, on 3 October 2018, he was elected FIDE President, receiving 103 votes, ahead of 78 votes for FIDE Vice President Georgios Makropoulos; noted English GM Nigel Short withdrew his candidacy minutes before voting commenced.

Dvorkovich's professional interests include economic regulation, financial management, and tax planning. According to BusinessWeek, Dvorkovich was included in the list of 50 potential world leaders in 2003.

Dvorkovich speaks English and German, as well as Russian.

In early March 2022, Dvorkovich became one of the few high-ranking officials with Kremlin ties to openly criticize the invasion of Ukraine, telling Mother Jones that "Wars are the worst things one might face in life…including this war," and that his thoughts were with Ukrainian civilians. Following these comments, Andrey Turchak, a senior official from Putin's United Russia party, accused Dvorkovich of "national betrayal" and acting as a "fifth column," calling for his "immediate dismissal in disgrace". Following this pressure, a statement was issued via the Skolkovo Foundation website, which nuanced his earlier position by expressing pride in the courage of Russian soldiers and condemning Western sanctions, shortly before he left the Foundation.

In August 2022, he was re-elected for a second term as FIDE president receiving 157 votes as against 16 by his rival Andrey Baryshpolets. In June 2026, he again put forward his candidacy to run for a third term. However, the following month he was included in the European Union's list of sanctions. As a result, he voluntarily suspended the exercise of his powers and duties, with Viswanathan Anand appointed interim president, and dropped out of the presidential race, with Timur Turlov, who had intended to be his running mate, stepping in.

== Honours and awards ==
- Order of Merit for the Fatherland 4th class
- Order of Honour
- Medal 2nd class of the Order of Merit for the Fatherland
- Medal "In Commemoration of the 1000th Anniversary of Kazan"
- Officer of the Order of Merit of the Italian Republic
