= Marina Makropoulou =

Greek chess player (born 1960)

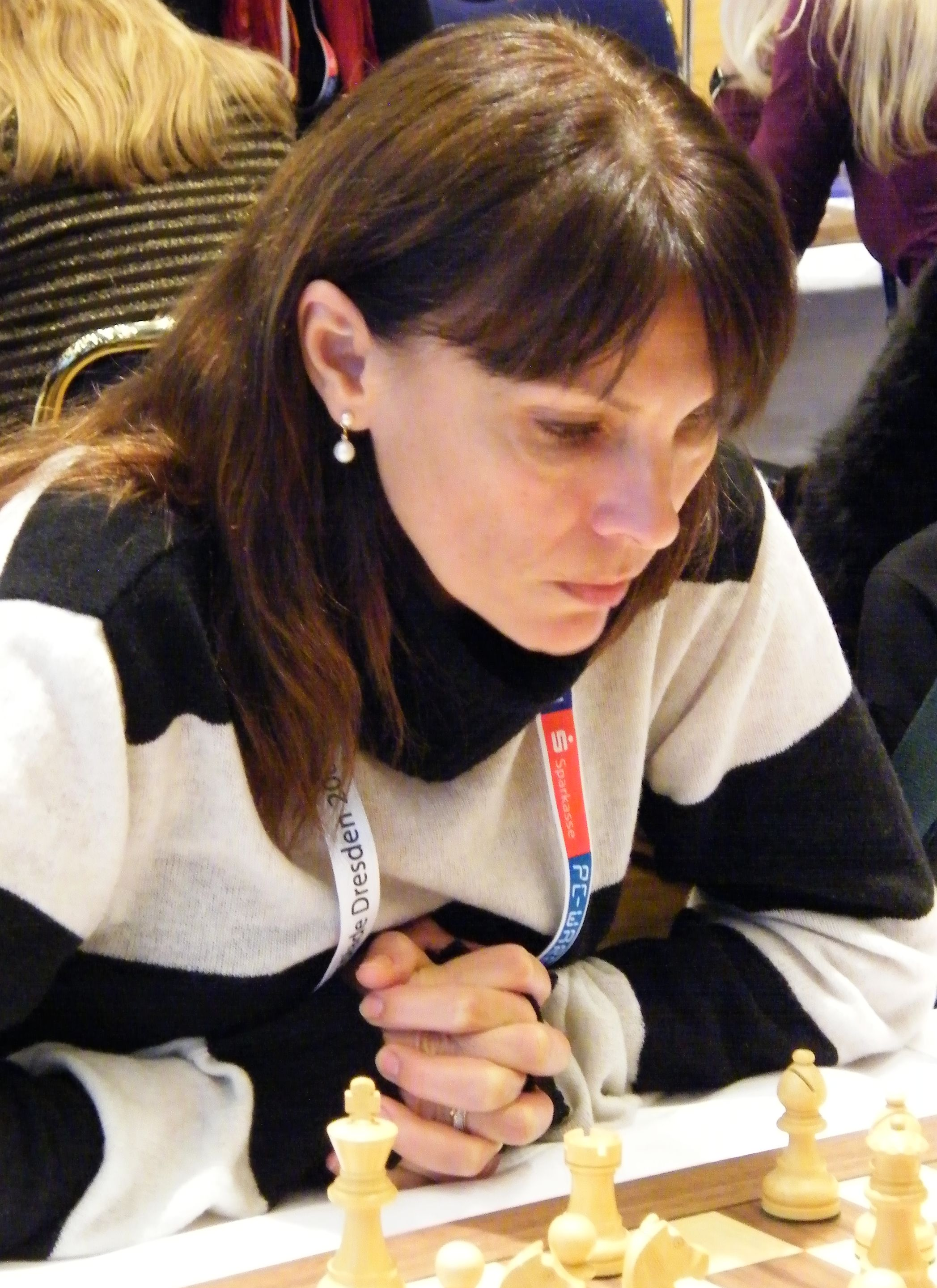
- Marina Makropoulou in 2008

Personal information
- Born: Marina Pogorevici; 3 December 1960 (age 65) Ploiești, Romania
- Spouse: Georgios Makropoulos

Chess career
- Country: Romania (until 1987); Greece (since 1987)
- Title: Woman Grandmaster (1982)
- Peak rating: 2330 (January 1994)

Marina Makropoulou (Greek: Μαρίνα Μακροπούλου; née Marina Pogorevici, born 3 December 1960, Ploiești) is a Greek chess player who holds the title of Woman Grandmaster (WGM, 1982). Her peak Elo rating is at 2330 in 1994. She is a Romanian Women's Chess Champion (1984) and nine time Greek Women's Chess Champion (1990, 1994, 1996, 1998, 1999, 2004, 2007, 2011, 2022) - which is the record for most Greek Women's Chess Championships. With her 2022 win, she tied Viktor Korchnoi's record for winning an Individual National Championship in 5 different decades (1980's, 1990's, 2000's, 2010's, 2020's).

In 1982 she won two Chess Olympiad medals in the 25th Chess Olympiad, a team silver and an individual bronze for her performance in the second board. In the same year she reached her highest ever ranking in the world, placed 18th in the Women's FIDE elo rating charts. She has had a career of 40 years as a professional player, remaining at the top-20 women players rating for 2 years, at the top-50 for over 6 years and at the top-100 for over 13 years. In her career she has won or drawn 5 Women's World Chess Champions Nona Gaprindashvili (2 wins, 1 loss), Susan Polgar (2 draws), Maia Chiburdanidze (2 draws), Ju Wenjun (1 draw) and Anna Ushenina (1 draw, 1 loss) which makes a record of 2 wins, 5 draws and 2 losses against five Women's World Chess Champions. She has participated overall in 15 Chess Olympiads and 11 European Team Championships representing either the Romanian or Greek national women's teams. In 2015 she became a World Vice-Champion winning the silver medal in the World Women's Senior Championship, a feat she repeated in the 2017 World Women's Senior Championship.

== Biography ==
Daughter of Romanian Women's Chess Champion Maria Albuleț, she learned to play at the age of ten. In the early 1980s she was one of the leading Romanian chess players. In the Romanian Women's Chess Championships she won three medals: gold (1984) and two silver (1980, 1983). In 1981, in Bydgoszcz she won the World Chess Championship Zonal tournament and got the right to play in the Interzonal Tournament, where she ranked in the 7th place in 1982, winning amongst others the former Women's World Champion Nona Gaprindashvili but losing eventually the qualification to the top 8 Candidates Matches by 1,5 point.

In 1982, she awarded the FIDE International Woman grandmaster (WGM) title. Was the first Romanian chess player who receive this title. Her mother, Maria Albuleț was a 3 times Romanian Champion and the first Romanian chess player to receive the FIDE International Woman master (WIM) title, 25 year earlier, in 1957. Coincidentally, both in 1957 and in 1982, Romania won the silver medal in the Women's Chess Olympiad, both times behind the powerful USSR national team, with Maria playing at the first board of Romania's national team and Marina playing at the second board, at the respective tournaments. Marina also won an individual bronze medal for her performance, behind the Women's World Chess Championship challenger at the time and 2nd in the world, Nana Alexandria.

In 1986, she married the 7 times Greek Chess Champion, Greek Chess Federation President from 1982 to 2021 and later FIDE Deputy President from 1996 to 2018 Georgios Makropoulos whom she had met in the 1982 Olympiad and she moved to Greece, receiving the Greek citizenship few years later. Makropoulou won nine times the Greek Women Chess Championships (1990, 1994, 1996, 1998, 1999, 2004, 2007, 2011, 2022) which is the record for most Greek Women's Chess Championships. In 1990, she participated in her second Interzonal Tournament, where ranked in the 13th place. The winner of many International Women's chess tournaments, including four wins in Athens tournament Acropolis (1982, 1987, 1988, 1991) and Guingamp (2005).

Marina Makropoulou has played overall 274 games in 30 team competitions for Greece's National team (Olympiads, World, European and Balkaniads) and 19 games in 3 competitions for Romania. She played for Romania and Greece in the Women's Chess Olympiads:

- In 1982, at second board in the 10th Chess Olympiad (women) in Lucerne (+7, =1, -3) and won team silver and individual bronze medals,
- In 1988, at first board in the 28th Chess Olympiad (women) in Thessaloniki (+5, =4, -5),
- In 1990, at first board in the 29th Chess Olympiad (women) in Novi Sad (+6, =3, -4),
- In 1992, at first board in the 30th Chess Olympiad (women) in Manila (+6, =4, -4),
- In 1994, at first board in the 31st Chess Olympiad (women) in Moscow (+6, =4, -3),
- In 1996, at second board in the 32nd Chess Olympiad (women) in Yerevan (+5, =5, -3),
- In 1998, at second board in the 33rd Chess Olympiad (women) in Elista (+6, =4, -3),
- In 2000, at second board in the 34th Chess Olympiad (women) in Istanbul (+6, =3, -4),
- In 2002, at second board in the 35th Chess Olympiad (women) in Bled (+4, =3, -6),
- In 2004, at third board in the 36th Chess Olympiad (women) in Calvià (+4, =7, -1),
- In 2006, at third board in the 37th Chess Olympiad (women) in Turin (+3, =3, -4),
- In 2008, at third board in the 38th Chess Olympiad (women) in Dresden (+6, =3, -2),
- In 2010, at third board in the 39th Chess Olympiad (women) in Khanty-Mansiysk (+6, =4, -0),
- In 2012, at third board in the 40th Chess Olympiad (women) in Istanbul (+3, =1, -4),
- In 2014, at fourth board in the 41st Chess Olympiad (women) in Tromsø (+5, =2, -2).

Marina Makropoulou played for Greece in the European Team Chess Championships:

- In 1992, at first board in the 1st European Team Chess Championship (women) in Debrecen (+2, =3, -2),
- In 1997, at second board in the 2nd European Team Chess Championship (women) in Pula (+3, =2, -3),
- In 1999, at second board in the 3rd European Team Chess Championship (women) in Batumi (+2, =1, -3),
- In 2001, at second board in the 4th European Team Chess Championship (women) in León (+3, =2, -2),
- In 2003, at second board in the 5th European Team Chess Championship (women) in Plovdiv (+2, =2, -2),
- In 2005, at third board in the 6th European Team Chess Championship (women) in Gothenburg (+3, =3, -3),
- In 2007, at third board in the 7th European Team Chess Championship (women) in Heraklion (+3, =4, -2),
- In 2009, at third board in the 8th European Team Chess Championship (women) in Novi Sad (+2, =2, -4),
- In 2011, at third board in the 9th European Team Chess Championship (women) in Porto Carras (+0, =2, -4),
- In 2013, at third board in the 10th European Team Chess Championship (women) in Warsaw (+1, =3, -4)
- In 2019, at fourth board in the 13th European Team Chess Championship (women) in Batumi (+2, =3, -2).

Marina Makropoulou played for Greece in the World Team Chess Championship:

- In 2011, at second board in the 3rd Women's World Team Chess Championship 2015 in Mardin (+2, =4, -3).
