= Augusto de Muro =

Argentine chess player and organizer

Augusto De Muro (? – 1959) was an Argentine chess player, organizer, and the second FIDE President. de Muro was the first non-European president of FIDE and the only non-European president until Florencio Campomanes, the first Asian president of FIDE.

He was the president of the Argentine Chess Federation and the head of the Organizing Committee for the 8th Chess Olympiad which took place at Buenos Aires from August 21 to September 19, 1939. In 2023, FIDE's Council recognized that de Muro was, indeed, appointed as the second FIDE President in 1939. His appointment was later contested, perhaps because his duties were unfulfilled during World War II.

When World War II began, de Muro, along with team captains – leading roles were played by Alexander Alekhine, Savielly Tartakower, and Albert Becker – decided to continue with the Olympiad. He was elected an Honorary Member of the FIDE in 1939.
