= Stock market in Russia =

The stock market in Russia covers the history of the stock market and financial markets in Russia. There was no stock market during the Soviet era and modern stock markets only emerging with reforms in the 1990s.

== History ==
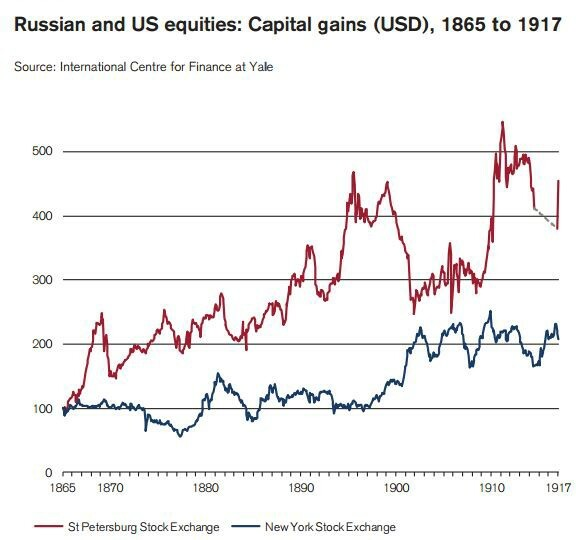
Indexes of Russian and US equities (1865 - 1917).

There existed a fledgling financial market in Russia before 1917 but these were closed after the Russian Revolution. The history of the stock market of the Russian Empire before 1917 was not directly related to the history of the modern Russian securities market. Under the conditions of the command and distribution economy of the USSR, the movement of financial flows was determined by the decision of the party and financial and economic bodies, therefore, there was no financial or stock market until the early 1990s. There was only the so-called "black market".

The securities market in Russia began to revive in the first half of 1991 after the Decree of the Council of Ministers of the Russian Soviet Federative Socialist Republic No. 601 of December 25, 1990 "On approval of the Regulations on joint-stock companies" was adopted. However, for a long time the low level of financial and economic savvy of the country's population as a whole did not allow the market to develop. The situation was also complicated by privatization frauds in 1993-1994. The dynamic development of the legitimate stock market began only after the resumption of growth of the Russian economy since the early 2000s.

== See also ==
- Russian Trading System
- Moscow Exchange
- Saint Petersburg Stock Exchange
