= Timur Turlov =

Kazakhstani businessman (born 1987)

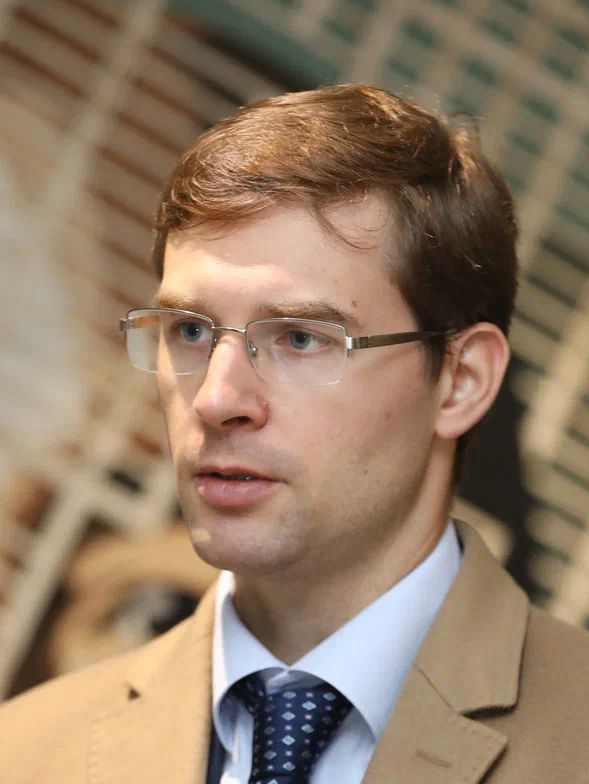
- Turlov in 2023

President of FIDE
- Incumbent
- Assumed office 26 September 2026
- Deputy: Viswanathan Anand
- Preceded by: Arkady Dvorkovich

Personal details
- Born: Timur Ruslanovich Turlov; 13 November 1987 (age 38) Moscow, Russian SFSR, Soviet Union
- Citizenship: Russia (until 2022); Saint Kitts and Nevis (until 2022); Kazakhstan (since 2022)
- Education: Moscow State Technical University (BSc)
- Occupation: CEO of Freedom Holding
- Website: timurturlov.com

Timur Ruslanovich Turlov (Note: Russian: Тимур Русланович Турлов; Kazakh: Тимур Русланұлы Турлов.) (born 13 November 1987) is a Russian-born Kazakhstani businessman who has served as the president of the International Chess Federation (FIDE) since September 2026. He founded the investment company Freedom Holding in 2008, and as of 2026 has an estimated net worth of US$7.4 billion.

== Business career ==
While at school, Turlov developed an interest in stock market investments.

After graduating from high school in 2003, he began working at the Moscow branch of World Capital Investments (WCI), an American investment company, where he worked as a trader.

In 2005, Turlov was hired by Yutreyd.ru, a subsidiary of "Uniastrum Bank" (Moscow), to deal with the American stock market operations. He succeeded and built an infrastructure, which gave a unit an access to US stock exchanges. During the 2008 financial crisis, Uniastrum Bank was sold to the Bank of Cyprus and the trading unit where Turlov worked was closed. Back then, he and his colleagues decided to use their knowledge and experience to run their own company.

=== Freedom Finance ===
In 2008, Timur Turlov founded Freedom Finance, which provides access to US stock exchanges and brokerage services. As of 2024, Freedom Finance was represented in 22 countries.

Turlov grew the business by attracting retail investors through active selling of American securities. In 2018, the company earned the "Financial Elite of Russia" award and was recognized as the fastest-growing broker. At the beginning of 2022, Freedom Finance was ranked 8th among the largest brokerage companies operating at the Moscow Exchange. The ranking was based on the number of the companies' registered clients.

In 2011, Turlov and his family moved to Kazakhstan, where two years later he opened the subsidiary Freedom Finance JSC. As of 2022, the subsidiary was the most active trading participant at the Kazakhstan Stock Exchange.

In 2015, Turlov became the main shareholder of Freedom Holding Corp. He used this brand to put Freedom Finance Investment Company, Freedom Finance JSC, Freedom24 and Freedom Finance Bank under one umbrella label.

Between 2015 and 2018, subsidiaries of Freedom Holding were opened in Ukraine, Kyrgyzstan, Uzbekistan, Germany, and Cyprus. In 2019, Timur Turlov made the holding public by listing shares on the American technology stock exchange Nasdaq. Thus, Freedom Holding became the first financial institution from the Commonwealth of Independent states to be listed on the Nasdaq Stock market.

In 2022, Turlov announced Freedom Holding Corp withdrawal from the Russian market, according to Reuters. The company exited Russia in October the same year.

== Chess ==
After becoming a Kazakh citizen, Turlov became the head of Kazakhstan Chess Federation in January 2023.

He was elected president of the International Chess Federation (FIDE) in September 2026, succeeding Arkady Dvorkovich in that position.

== Personal life ==
Turlov was born in Moscow on 13 November 1987. He is married and has six children. He holds a BSc from Moscow State Technical University.

He has been domiciled in Kazakhstan since moving there in 2011. In June 2022, Turlov confirmed that he had acquired Kazakh citizenship after renouncing his Russian and St. Kitts and Nevis citizenship.

=== Legal issues ===
In December 2022, Turlov was included in Ukraine's sanctions list. His Ukraine-based company called this decision a "mechanical error". Three years later, the company initiated the process of returning blocked assets to its clients from Ukraine. As of 2026, the sanctions remain in effect.

On 1 October 2026, the Prosecutor General's Office of Russia filed a lawsuit against Turlov and Freedom Holding. The lawsuit was submitted to Moscow's Tverskoy District Court, and seeks the confiscation of Turlov's assets in Russia. According to Russian law enforcement agencies, this involves funds, assets, and movable and immovable property with a total value of "hundreds of millions of dollars".
