= Freedom Holding =

Investment conglomerate, headquartered in Kazakhstan

Freedom Holding Corp.
- Type: Public
- Traded as: Nasdaq: FRHC; Russell 1000 component
- Industry: Diversified investments
- Founded: 2008; 18 years ago in Arizona, U.S.
- Founder: Timur Turlov
- Headquarters: Almaty, Kazakhstan
- Area served: Europe, Central Asia, U.S.
- Revenue: US$2.1 billion (for the 12 months ended 31 March 2025)
- Net income: US$ 84.5 million (for the 12 months ended 31 March 2025)
- Total assets: US$ 9.9 billion (as of March 31, 2025)
- Total equity: US$ 1.214 billion (as of March 31, 2025)
- Website: Freedom Holding Corp Freedom Broker Freedom Finance EuropeFreedom Lithuania

Freedom Holding Corp. is an American investment conglomerate headquartered in Almaty, Kazakhstan. Founded in 2008 by Timur Turlov in the United States, the company provides a range of services in retail financial securities brokerage and trading, asset management, capital markets, investment research and counseling, investment banking and underwriting services, mortgages, insurance, banking and other consumer services. Its main area of focus is in the American stock market, as well as the markets of Europe and Central Asia, mainly Kazakhstan.

It provides access to trading on the Kazakhstani exchange KASE, the Astana International Exchange (AIX), as well as on the American exchanges NYSE, NASDAQ, CBOE, CME, AMEX, and the European stock exchanges LSE and Euronext.

As of the end of 2024, Freedom Holding Corp. operates in 22 countries.

Freedom Holdings Corp. owns the Kazakh bank Freedom Finance and Kazakhstani broker Freedom Finance JSC with offices in 16 cities in Kazakhstan, 8 cities in Uzbekistan, and one office in Kyrgyzstan.

== History ==
The company was founded in 2008 by Timur Turlov. In 2013, Freedom Finance established a subsidiary brokerage company, Freedom Finance JSC in Kazakhstan.

In 2013, the European subsidiary Freedom Finance Europe was established. In 2015, it obtained a full set of licenses from the Cyprus Securities and Exchange Commission (CySEC).

In 2014 the company arranged the listing of Bank of America stocks on KASE.

In 2015 the Company became a market maker for stocks of the national power operator of Kazakhstan, KEGOC, and in 2016 it carried out an IPO for Aktobe Metalware Plant JSC, which holds 70% of the metalwork market in Kazakhstan.

In 2017 the Company acquired one of its competitors, the Kazakhstani broker Asyl-Invest.

As of May 2017 the Company was a market maker for 12 securities: KEGOC, BAST, Aktobe Metalware Plant JSC, Bank of America, ETF S&P 500, along with major Russian bluechips like Aeroflot, Gazprom, Rostelecom, Magnit, Uralkali.

In 2015, BMB Munai was acquired and subsequently renamed Freedom Holding Corp., which included Freedom Finance, with Timur Turlov becoming the majority shareholder of Freedom Holding Corp.

In 2018, Freedom Finance entered the Uzbekistani securities market, establishing offices in 8 cities across the country. In the following year, the company has done several IPOs and SPOs for local manufacturing companies.

In October, 2019 Freedom Holding Corp. has been approved for listing on The Nasdaq Capital Market under the "FRHC." symbol, therefore marking company's IPO. The holding's shares are also traded on Kazakhstan's stock exchanges, KASE and AIX. FRHC shares are included in the MSCI U.S. Small Cap 1750 Index, MSCI U.S. Investable Market 2500 Index and Kazakhstan's AIX Qazaq Index (with a 15% share).

In June 2020 Freedom Holdings acquired the Russian stock broker and financial company Zerich Capital Management after it was approved by the Russian Federal Antimonopoly Service. Freedom said it would integrate the business into its existing Russian holdings. That same year the company acquired а Kazakh bank – Bank Kassa Nova JSC, the name of the bank was later changed to Freedom Bank Kazakhstan JSC.

In 2021 Freedom Holding Corp. completed acquisition of American broker Prime Executions, Inc. The acquisition marked the company's initial entry into the U.S. markets.

In 2021 Freedom Holding acquired Ticketon. In the same year Freedom Holding purchased Paybox for $11.5 million and the online supermarket Arbuz.

In 2022, the American subsidiary Freedom Capital Markets received a license to conduct underwriting activities.

In 2022, the holding company changed its auditor from WSRP and started working with Deloitte a "Big Four" accounting firm.

In October 2022, Freedom Holding Corp. announced withdrawal from Russia by selling its assets to the local management. The company has finalised its withdrawal from Russia by February 2023.

On April 24, 2023 Freedom Holding Corp. announced the acquisition of 100% shares in Aviata.kz and Chocotravel services from ChocoFamily Holding. The transaction amount is $32.3 million.

In 2023, Freedom Holding Corp. completed the acquisition of LD Micro, a conference platform for small-cap companies, formerly owned by SRAX.

In August 2023, Hindenburg Research released a report on Freedom Finance, which included allegations that the company was evading sanctions and compliance rules. The U.S. Securities and Exchange Commission and Department of Justice investigated related issues. An independent review by the legal team at Morgan, Lewis & Bockius and the forensic accounting experts at Forensic Risk Alliance concluded that the allegations were unfounded.

In June 2024, the holding company completed a cross-listing of its securities on the AIX exchange. On October 1, 2024, Freedom Holding Corp. shares were included in the AIX Qazaq Index, representing a 15% weighting.

In 2025, Freedom Holding launched QalamBalam, a media platform for children and teenagers created on the basis of the Qalam media group.

In the same year, the construction of the Freedom Cloud data center began. It is intended to establish a transit data transmission channel between Europe and China through Kazakhstan.

== Operations ==
=== Holding ===
As of 2024, Freedom Holding Corp. headquarters are located in Almaty, with company offices operating in 22 countries, including the United States, Uzbekistan, Cyprus, the United Kingdom, and Germany.

Brokerage companies provide access to stock exchanges in Kazakhstan (KASE and AIX), the United States (NYSE and Nasdaq), Hong Kong (HKEX), Uzbekistan (Tashkent Stock Exchange and the Uzbek Republican Currency Exchange), as well as European stock exchanges. Client transactions are conducted using the holding's proprietary platform, Tradernet.

In its home market of Kazakhstan, Freedom is developing a digital ecosystem that integrates banking, brokerage, and consumer services.

The company offers webinars, seminars, distant and resident courses in trading along with their professional services.

In December 2024, the agency S&P Global Ratings reaffirmed the long-term ratings of Freedom Holding Corp. at the "B+" level with a "stable" outlook.

=== Subsidiaries ===
==== List of subsidiaries ====
As of 2024, the holding included the following entities:

- Freedom Finance JSC: A securities broker based in Kazakhstan.
- Freedom Finance Global PLC: A securities broker operating in Astana International Financial Centre.
- Freedom Bank Kazakhstan JSC: A banking institution in Kazakhstan.
- Freedom Bank Tajikistan JSC: A banking institution in Tajikistan
- Freedom Finance Life JSC: A life and health insurance provider in Kazakhstan.
- Freedom Finance Insurance JSC: A liability insurance provider in Kazakhstan.
- Freedom Finance Special Purpose Company LTD: Kazakhstan.
- Freedom Finance Commercial LLP: A consulting company in Kazakhstan.
- Freedom Finance Europe Ltd.: A brokerage firm based in Cyprus.
- Freedom Finance Technologies Ltd: An IT development company in Cyprus.
- Freedom Finance Germany: Germany.
- Freedom UK Prime Limited: A financial intermediary in the United Kingdom.
- Freedom Finance Uzbekistan LLC: A brokerage firm in Uzbekistan.
- Freedom Finance Armenia LLC: A brokerage firm in Armenia.
- Prime Executions, Inc.: A brokerage firm in the United States.
- FFIN Securities, Inc.: United States.
- Freedom Finance Ltd.: A financial intermediary in the UAE.
- ITS Tech Limited: An IT support company in the Astana International Financial Centre.
- Freedom Kazakhstan PC Ltd.: Kazakhstan.
- Freedom Finance Turkey LLC: A financial consulting firm in Turkey.
- Freedom Telecom LLP: A telecommunications company in Kazakhstan.
- Arbuz Group LLP: An e-commerce and online retail company in Kazakhstan.
- Aviata LLP: An online ticket aggregator in Kazakhstan.
- Ticketon Events LLP ("Ticketon"): An online ticket sales platform in Kazakhstan.
- Freedom Technologies LLP ("Paybox"): A payment service in Kazakhstan.

==== Freedom Finance JSC ====
As of July 1, 2024, JSC Freedom Finance serves as the official market maker for 101 securities listed on the Kazakhstan Stock Exchange (KASE) and for 10 securities listed on the Astana International Exchange. The company introduced stocks of global companies such as Apple Inc., Facebook Inc., Microsoft Corporation, Starbucks Corporation, Ford Motor Company, The Coca-Cola Company, and Nike Inc. to the Kazakhstani market.

In 2013, Freedom Finance acquired JSC Seven Rivers Capital, which had been operating in the securities market since 2006.

As of 2024, Freedom Finance holds leading positions in KASE rankings for activity in the equity, debt, and government securities sectors, as well as in repo and currency swap operations.

As of 2024, more than 86,000 accounts have been opened since the company's inception.

In 2022, the broker's market share accounted for 60-70% in terms of volumes and the number of clients.

==== Bank Freedom Finance Kazakhstan ====
The bank was established in 2020 through the acquisition and renaming of KassaNova Bank. Freedom Bank Kazakhstan offers products such as multi-currency and investment cards, online lending, and digital mortgages. In 2022, the bank had a market share of 58% in the online lending niche. By the end of 2023, it ranked among the top 8 banks by asset size.

==== Freedom Finance Global ====
Freedom Finance Global is a brokerage company registered in Kazakhstan in 2020. It holds a license from the Financial Services Regulation Committee to provide access to international financial markets (NYSE/NASDAQ, London Stock Exchange, Börse Frankfurt, HKEX, KASE, AIX) and exclusive access to IPOs and option trading. In 2022, the broker obtained a Qualified Foreign Investor (QFI) certificate in China.

In 2024, Freedom Finance Global became the first full member of the International Capital Market Association (ICMA) in Kazakhstan and Central Asia.

By the end of 2021, the broker had opened over 27,000 accounts and served nearly 60,000 clients in 2022, as of April 1, 2024, the company managed 178,000 accounts.

==== Freedom Finance Insurance ====
Freedom Finance Insurance, formerly known as Trust Insurance, was acquired at the end of 2018 and has been operating in the Kazakhstan market since 2009. The company introduced technology for special insurance terminals and launched online policy transfer services. In January 2020, Freedom Finance Insurance launched online car insurance against accidents. In terms of assets, the company ranked eighth in 2021, with a 87% increase compared to the previous year. In 2022, the holding acquired Insurance company London-Almaty JSC, which was later merged with Freedom Finance Insurance.

==== Freedom Finance Life ====
Operating in the Kazakhstani market since 2014, the company has been functioning under the Freedom brand since late 2018.

Key areas of activity include:

- Life savings insurance programs (LSI),
- Travel insurance for trips abroad,
- Pension annuities.

==== Freedom Finance Europe Ltd. ====
Freedom Finance Europe Ltd. obtained direct membership in the international central securities depository Euroclear in 2021, expanding its range of operational, settlement, and depository services for clients in the European, UK, and US markets.

As of the end of 2024, the European broker serves more than 300,000 clients.

In 2024, the company was renamed Freedom24. It provides access to global stock markets, including European platforms such as ARCA, XETRA, and EURONEXT, as well as exchanges in Madrid, Vienna, Milan, Frankfurt, London, and Athens.

==== Financial performance ====
For the first half of the 2025 fiscal year (April 1 to September 30, 2024), Freedom Holding Corp. reported revenue of $1.03 billion. The company's market capitalization exceeds $6 billion. By the end of the 2025 fiscal year, the holding's revenue amounted to $2.1 billion, and its market capitalization exceeded $8.6 billion. In 2025, Freedom Holding Corp. shares were included in the Russell 3000 Index, which tracks the performance of the largest U.S. companies.

==== Charity ====
Freedom Holding is one of the largest philanthropists in Kazakhstan.

Responsibility for charitable activities rests with the Freedom Shapagat Foundation, established within the holding. In 2024, Freedom Holding Corp. allocated over 40 billion tenge to charitable and sponsorship initiatives. The main areas of its charitable activities include sports, education, and flood relief in western Kazakhstan.

Since 2021, the holding has been involved in the restoration of the Aral Sea ecosystem. Freedom Shapagat also allocated $4.5 million for the construction of a pumping station and water pipelines connecting a desalination plant with the central water supply hub in Aktau. This project helped provide more than 200,000 residents of Aktau with drinking water.

In 2025, Freedom JFL, the company's youth football project, was recognized as the 'Best Sports Organization' and received the national Metaratings Top Award.

In the same year, a new building dedicated to artificial intelligence and advanced technologies was opened at SDU University (Kazakhstan), funded by Freedom Holding Corp.
