= Georgios Makropoulos =

Greek chess player (1953–2026)

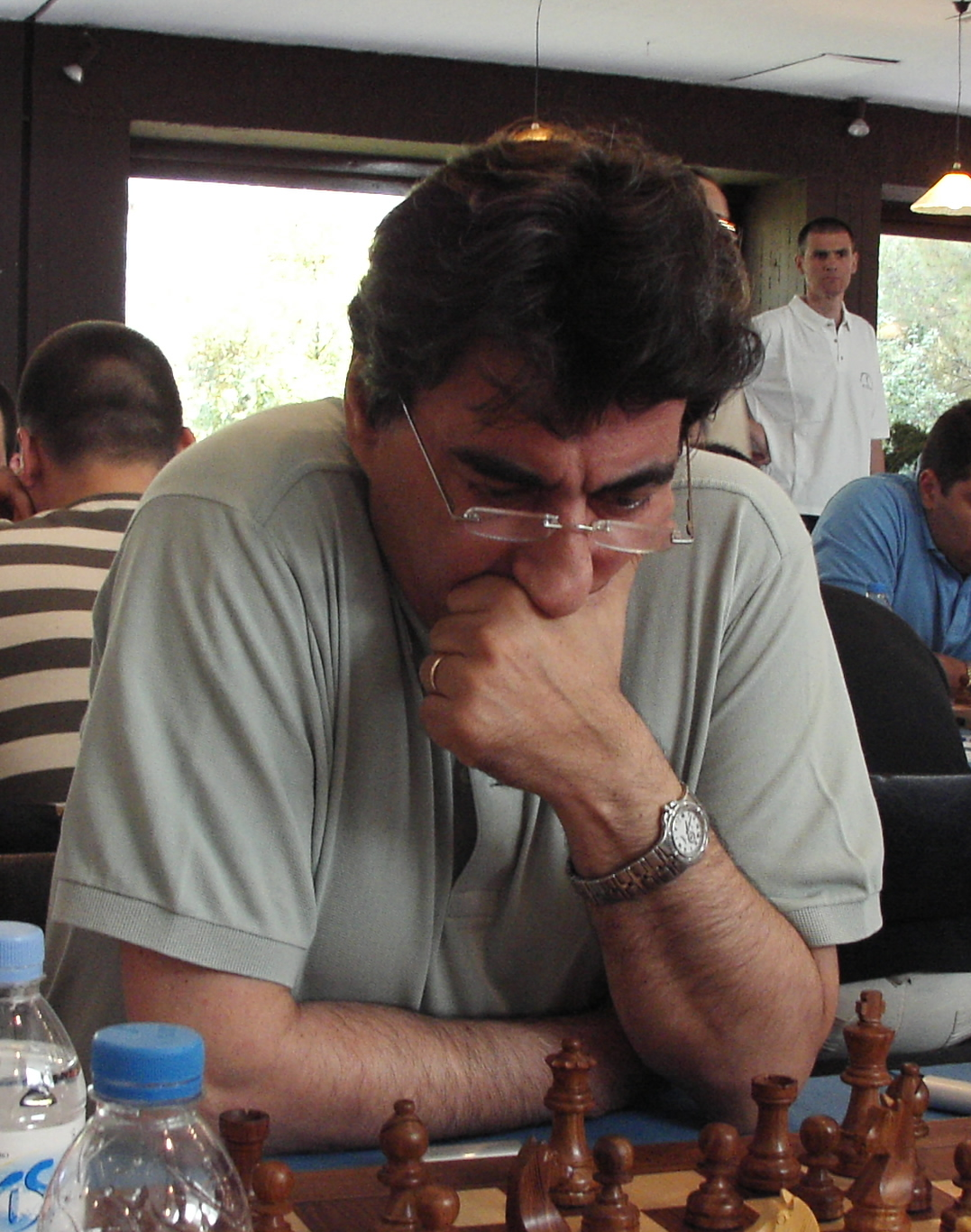
- Makropoulos in 2006

Personal information
- Born: 29 September 1953 Thessaloniki, Greece
- Died: 15 September 2026 (aged 72)
- Spouse: Marina Pogorevici

Chess career
- Country: Greece
- Title: International Master (1979)
- Peak rating: 2485 (January 1981)

Georgios Makropoulos (Greek: Γεώργιος Μακρόπουλος; 29 September 1953 – 15 September 2026) was a Greek chess player. He achieved the title of International Master (IM) in 1979 and was a seven-time Greek Chess Championship winner (1971, 1973, 1975, 1977, 1978, 1980, 1985).

== Chess player career ==
As a player, Makropoulos belonged to the Greek chess elite in the 70s and 80s. He twice participated in World Junior Chess Championship (1969, 1971). Between 1971 and 1985, Makropoulos won the Greek Chess Championship seven times. He was International Master since 1979 and achieved a Grandmaster norm in the 1980 Banco di Roma tournament.

Makropoulos played for Greece in the Chess Olympiad:

- In 1972, at first reserve board in the 20th Chess Olympiad in Skopje (+4, =8, -2).
- In 1974, at first board in the 21st Chess Olympiad in Nice (+3, =1, -3),
- In 1980, at first board in the 24th Chess Olympiad in Valletta (+5, =3, -3).

He played for Greece in the European Team Chess Championships:

- In 1989, at sixth board in the 9th European Team Chess Championship in Haifa (+3, =2, -2).

Makropoulos played for Greece in the Men's Chess Balkaniads:

- In 1971, at third board in the 3rd Men's Chess Balkaniad in Athens (+0, =1, -0) and won individual bronze medal,
- In 1973, at fourth board in the 5th Men's Chess Balkaniad in Poiana Brașov (+2, =0, -2),
- In 1978, at first board in the 10th Men's Chess Balkaniad in Băile Herculane (+1, =0, -3),
- In 1979, at first board in the 11th Chess Balkaniad in Bihać (+1, =2, -2),
- In 1981, at first board in the 13th Chess Balkaniad in Athens (+0, =0, -4),
- In 1983, at fourth board in the 15th Chess Balkaniad in Băile Herculane (+1, =3, -0) and won individual silver medal,
- In 1985, at sixth board in the 17th Chess Balkaniad in Irakleio (+2, =2, -0) and won individual silver medal.

== Chess official career ==
Makropoulos worked from 1977 as a journalist for the Athens daily newspaper Eleftherotypia. He was President of the Greek Chess Federation from 1982 to 2021, after which he became its Honorary President. Numerous international chess events took place in Greece under his aegis, including the two Chess Olympiads in Thessaloniki: 1984 and 1988.

After the President of FIDE Florencio Campomanes awarded the Chess Olympiad 1986 to Dubai in 1984 and the organizing Chess Federation of the United Arab Emirates then announced that it would not invite the Israeli team, Makropoulos together with Raymond Keene and Don Schultz was member of a negotiation commission, which from the end of 1984 was supposed to find solutions to the crisis that had arisen on behalf of FIDE. Despite international protests and despite the commission's efforts, the Israeli team did not take part in the Dubai Olympics. At the FIDE Congress in Dubai, the statutes were changed in such a way that future refusal by the hosts of individual associations to FIDE events should only be possible with the consent of a three-quarters majority of the FIDE General Assembly.

In 1986, Makropoulos became Vice President of FIDE. In 1990, he moved to the position of Secretary General of the organization, a position he held until 1996. After that Makropoulos was Deputy President of FIDE until 2018. In 2006, Makropoulos supported the renewed candidacy of the FIDE President Kirsan Ilyumzhinov, who prevailed at the congress in Turin against Bessel Kok with 96:54 votes. In 2018, Makropoulos himself ran unsuccessfully against Arkady Dvorkovich. He returned to FIDE leadership in 2022, when he was elected as one of four elected Vice Presidents and became a member of the FIDE Council. He remained a FIDE Vice President until his death in September 2026. At the time of his death, he was also an approved candidate for re-election as an elected Vice President at the 2026 FIDE General Assembly.

== Personal life and death ==
Makropoulos died on 15 September 2026, at the age of 72. Following his death, the Greek Chess Federation adopted a formal resolution honouring his contribution to Greek and international chess. Among the measures announced in his memory were the naming of the federation’s board meeting room as the “Georgios Makropoulos Hall” and the consideration of an annual event or other institutional initiative in his memory. His memory was also honoured with minutes of silence at several official chess events; among them, the fourth round of the 2026 Chess Olympiad began with a minute of silence in his memory. His widow is the chess player Marina Makropoulou, Romania’s first Woman Grandmaster and a nine-time Greek Women's Chess Champion, with whom he had two children.
