= Extended Position Description =

Extended Position Description (EPD) is a standard for describing chess games and chess positions and an extended set of structured attribute values using the ASCII character set. EPD was developed by John Stanback and Steven J. Edwards. Its first implementation is in Stanback's chessplaying program Zarkov. It extends the Forsyth–Edwards Notation (FEN) except for the halfmove clock and full move number which are not mandatory, but implemented as operations hmvc and fmvn. It is intended for data and command interchange among chessplaying computer programs. It is also intended to represent portable opening library repositories.

== See also ==
- Forsyth–Edwards Notation
- Portable Game Notation
