= David Forsyth (chess player) =

Scottish chess player

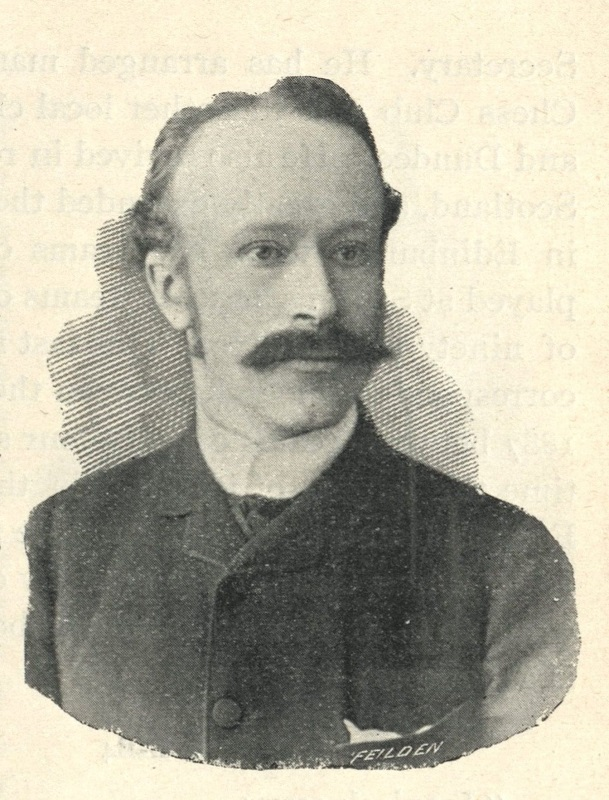
- Sketch of Forsyth in 1897
- Born: 1854; Alness, Scotland
- Died: 1909 (aged 54–55)
- Occupation: Solicitor
- Parent: David Forsyth

David Forsyth (1854–1909) was a Scotsman who emigrated to New Zealand, served as chess editor of the Glasgow Weekly Herald. Forsyth invented a method for recording chess positions, which he published in the Glasgow Weekly Herald in 1883, now known as Forsyth notation. He won the New Zealand Chess Championship in 1901.

He was also one of the compilers of what was possibly the first regular Go column in any newspaper (in the Otago Witness, from February 1902 until March 1903), according to the New Zealand Go Society.

In recent times, Forsyth notation has been extended as Forsyth–Edwards Notation for use with computers.
