= Spike (chess) =

Chess engine

- Developers: Ralf Schäfer and Volker Böhm
- Release: 2004
- Stable release: 1.4 / February 2011
- Written in: C++, Java
- Operating system: Microsoft Windows
- Type: Chess engine
- License: Freeware
- Website: www.spikechess.de

Spike is a freeware chess engine developed by German programmers Ralf Schäfer and Volker Böhm. First released in 2004, the program operates as a standalone engine without a graphical user interface (GUI) and supports both the Chess Engine Communication Protocol (WinBoard) and the Universal Chess Interface (UCI) protocol. Spike gained international prominence in 2005 when it won the 1st Livingston Chess960 Computer World Championship in Mainz.

== History and design ==
Development of Spike began in early 2004. The authors built the engine from scratch while incorporating concepts from two of their previous programs, Cheetah and IceSpell. The engine's name was taken from the character Spike from the television series Buffy the Vampire Slayer, reflecting a tactical and aggressive playing style.

Spike was developed using a multi-language approach: it was written in C++ and Java simultaneously, restricted to a common subset of both languages. A custom conversion tool, termed a "Javanizer," was used to transform classes between C++ and Java. Although the engine utilizes object wrappers for Java compatibility, its core search and evaluation architecture is structured procedurally.

For board representation, Spike uses a 16×14 mailbox array for vector attack calculations, combining features of 0x88 board representation with a 10×12 inner board structure. Its search algorithm relies on principal variation search (PVS) with adaptive null-move pruning, late move reductions (LMR), history pruning, and futility pruning. In February 2011, version 1.4 was released, introducing native parallel search capabilities for multi-core processors, rewritten evaluation code for material tables and passed pawns, and improved endgame heuristics.

== Competitive results ==
Spike supports Chess960 (Fischer Random Chess) play. In August 2005, Spike won the 1st Livingston Chess960 Computer World Championship held during the Chess Classic in Mainz, scoring 5½/7 in a 19-program Swiss-system tournament ahead of engines such as Shredder.

Spike subsequently represented Germany in several international computer chess events, including the World Computer Chess Championship (WCCC) in Turin in 2006, the International Paderborn Computer Chess Championship (IPCCC), the Dutch Open Computer Chess Championship, and the Chess Computer Tournament (CCT). The engine's opening book was compiled by Timo Haupt (né Klaustermeyer), who also operated Spike during live competitions.
