= Chess960 =

Chess with a randomized starting position

Position: a8 black rook, b8 black bishop, c8 black king, d8 black knight, e8 black bishop, f8 black knight, g8 black rook, h8 black queen, a7 black pawn, b7 black pawn, c7 black pawn, d7 black pawn, e7 black pawn, f7 black pawn, g7 black pawn, h7 black pawn, a2 white pawn, b2 white pawn, c2 white pawn, d2 white pawn, e2 white pawn, f2 white pawn, g2 white pawn, h2 white pawn, a1 white rook, b1 white bishop, c1 white king, d1 white knight, e1 white bishop, f1 white knight, g1 white rook, h1 white queen
One of 960 possible starting setups. (Example Chess960 position on the image: 760.) Black's setup always mirrors White's.
- Years active: Since June 19, 1996
- Genres: Board game; Chess variant
- Players: 2
- Setup time: ≈1 min + 1 min to determine starting position
- Playing time: Casual games: 10–60 min Tournament games: from 10 min (fast chess) to 6 hours
- Chance: Pieces are randomized
- Skills: Strategy, tactics
- Synonyms: Fischer Random Chess

Chess960, also known as Fischer Random Chess, is a chess variant that randomizes the starting position of the pieces on the back rank. It was introduced by former world chess champion Bobby Fischer in 1996 to reduce the emphasis on opening preparation and to encourage creativity in play. Chess960 uses the same board and pieces as classical chess, but the starting position of the pieces on the players' home ranks is randomized, following certain rules. The random setup makes gaining an advantage through the memorization of openings unfeasible. Players instead must rely on their skill and creativity.

Randomizing the main pieces had long been known as shuffle chess, but Fischer introduced new rules for the initial random setup, "preserving the dynamic nature of the game by retaining bishops of opposite colors for each player and the right to castle for both sides". The result is 960 distinct possible starting positions.

In 2008, FIDE added Chess960 to an appendix of the Laws of Chess. (Note: In 2008 FIDE added Chess960 rules to an appendix of the Handbook. This section is now classified under "Guidelines", indicating that the rules presented do not have the weight of FIDE law.) The first world championship officially sanctioned by FIDE, the FIDE World Fischer Random Chess Championship 2019, brought additional prominence to the variant. It was won by Wesley So. In 2022, Hikaru Nakamura won the second edition. In 2026, Magnus Carlsen became the new champion.

== Rules ==
=== Setup ===
Before the game, a starting position is randomly determined and set up, subject to certain requirements. White's pieces (not pawns) are placed randomly on the first rank, following two rules:

1. The bishops must be placed on opposite-color squares.
2. The king must be placed on a square between the rooks.

There are 960 possible starting positions. The starting position is usually chosen randomly by software, but can be done using multiple rolls of a standard six-sided die.

Black's pieces are placed equal-and-opposite to White's pieces. (For example, if the white king is randomly determined to start on f1, then the black king is placed on f8.) Pawns are placed on the players' second ranks as in classical chess.

After setup, the game is played the same as classical chess in all respects, with the exception of castling from the different possible starting positions for king and rooks.

=== Castling rules ===
As in classical chess, each player may castle once per game, moving both the king and a rook in a single move; however, the castling rules were reinterpreted in Chess960 to support the different possible initial positions of king and rook. After castling, the final positions of king and rook are the same as in classical chess, namely:

Examples of castling

Position: a8 black rook, b8 black king, e8 black rook, d2 white pawn, e2 white pawn, a1 white rook, b1 white king, e1 white rook

An example initial position of kings and rooks

Position: a8 black rook, f8 black rook, g8 black king, d2 white pawn, e2 white pawn, c1 white king, d1 white rook, e1 white rook

White has castled a-side (0-0-0) and Black has castled h-side (0-0).

- After a-side castling (queenside/long castling in classical chess), the king finishes on the c-file and the a-side rook finishes on the d-file. The move is notated 0-0-0 as in classical chess.
- After h-side castling (kingside/short castling in classical chess), the king finishes on the g-file and the h-side rook finishes on the f-file. The move is notated 0-0 as in classical chess.

Castling prerequisites are the same as in classical chess, with some minor clarifications:

- In standard chess, the king and the castling rook must not have previously moved. In Chess960, it is also specified that a player may only castle once in a game, because in some configurations it is possible to castle without moving the king.
- The player must not castle out of check or through check. This means that no square from the king's initial square to its final square may be under attack by an enemy piece, even if the king is already on its final square.
  - There is no such restriction on the rook. The rook may move from, through or onto a threatened square, provided that no other restriction prevents this.
- All the squares between the king's initial and final squares (including the final square), and all the squares between the castling rook's initial and final squares (including the final square), must be vacant except for the king and castling rook.

FIDE's recommended procedure for castling unambiguously is first to move the king outside the playing area next to its final square, then to move the rook to its final square, then to move the king to its final square. Another recommendation is to verbally announce the intent to castle before doing so.

== History ==
=== Van Zuylen van Nijevelt's early contributions ===
The concept of random chess, also known as shuffle chess, was first proposed by the Dutch chess enthusiast Philip Julius van Zuylen van Nijevelt (1743–1826). In his renowned treatise on chess, La Supériorité aux Échecs, published in 1792, Van Zuylen van Nijevelt articulated his disdain for the repetitive patterns often found in standard chess openings. He proposed the idea of randomizing the starting positions of the main pieces to create a vast array of distinct situations, eliminating the possibility of pre-game memorization or extensive opening theory. Van Zuylen van Nijevelt's book, with its full title La Supériorité aux Échecs mise à la portée de tout le monde, et particulièrement des dames qui aiment cet amusement ("Superiority in Chess brought into the reach of all, and particularly of ladies who love that amusement/as passtime"), gained significant popularity and was reprinted several times. Its influence extended beyond the French-speaking world of that time, as it was subsequently translated into multiple languages, spreading the idea of randomizing the initial positions of chess pieces to a wider audience. This early conception of random chess by Van Zuylen van Nijevelt laid the foundation for Chess960.

Van Zuylen van Nijevelt's innovative approach to chess not only offered a solution to the repetitive nature of traditional openings but also paved the way for the exploration of chess variants that deviate from the conventional starting position. His quote within La Supériorité aux Échecs emphasizes the core principle behind random chess, stating, "This produces a huge number of different situations, so that no one can study them beforehand," reflecting his desire to introduce an element of unpredictability and originality into the game of chess. The legacy of Van Zuylen van Nijevelt's contributions to the evolution of chess remains significant, with his early insights serving as a cornerstone for the development of various randomized chess variants, including Chess960.

=== Development and further evolution ===
The pioneering work of Van Zuylen van Nijevelt found continued development through the efforts of his nephew, the Jonkheer Elias van der Hoeven (1778–1854), a Dutch diplomat. Van der Hoeven took the concept of shuffle chess further, potentially sharing his insights with Aaron Alexandre, evident from Alexandre's incorporation of the theory into his Encyclopédie des échecs in 1837.

The earliest documented games of shuffle chess were played between Van der Hoeven and Alexandre in Mannheim in 1842, with Alexandre emerging victorious with a score of 3–0. One of these games is preserved in Sissa, the Netherlands' first long-standing chess journal, demonstrating an initial position with two advanced pawns on each side. A later game played by Van der Hoeven was against Baron von der Lasa (1818–1899), adhering more closely to the contemporary rules of random chess, except for the monochromatic bishop pairs.

In 1851, Van der Hoeven visited Willem Verbeek, the editor-in-chief of Sissa. Verbeek and Hancock, Verbeek's chess companion in Amsterdam during the 1850s, delved into shuffle chess, with their initial findings documented in the pages of the Sissa journal.

Van der Hoeven's modifications to the original concept of random chess were published in Alexandre's Encyclopédie in 1837 and later republished in Sissa by an individual known as T. Scheidius. This variant began to be referred to as "schaakspel, naar de wijze van jhr. Van der Hoeven" or "schaakspel à la Van der Hoeven."

Following Van der Hoeven's visit, the Sissa Chess Society received an invitation from the Philidor Chess Society in Amsterdam, in collaboration with Van der Hoeven, to organize a shuffle chess tournament. The aim was to promote the dissemination and popularity of the chess variant attributed to Van der Hoeven. Originally intended as a tournament among the eight prize winners of the 1851 Philidor-organized event, logistical challenges led to invitations being extended to other chess societies. Ultimately, a tournament with seven players from Amsterdam, along with the 74-year-old Van der Hoeven, was organized. Notable participants included Maarten van 't Kruijs (Philidor), J. Seligmann (Philidor), H. Kloos (La Bourdonnais), M.M. Coopman, and F.G. Hijmans / S. Heijmans, supplemented by Mohr and J. van Praag. Van ’t Kruijs emerged as the winner of the tournament, reinforcing the growing sentiment that the removal of opening theory allows true chess talent to shine.

=== Fischer's influence and popularization ===
Fischer's modification "imposes certain restrictions, arguably an improvement on the anarchy of the fully randomized game in which one player is almost certain to start at an advantage". Fischer started to develop his new version of chess after the 1992 return match with Boris Spassky. The result was the formulation of the rules of Fischer Random Chess in September 1993, introduced formally to the public under the name "Fischerandom Chess", on June 19, 1996, in Buenos Aires, Argentina.

Fischer's goal was to eliminate what he considered the complete dominance of opening preparation in classical chess, replacing it with creativity and talent. In a situation where the starting position was random it would be impossible to fix every move of the game. Since the "opening book" for 960 possible opening systems would be too difficult to devote to memory, the players must create every move originally. From the first move, both players must devise original strategies and cannot use well-established patterns. Fischer believed that eliminating memorized book moves would level the playing field.

During summer 1993, Bobby Fischer visited László Polgár and his family in Hungary. All of the Polgar sisters (Judit Polgár, Susan Polgar, and Sofia Polgar) played many games of Fischer Random Chess with Fischer. At one point Sofia beat Fischer three games in a row. Fischer was not pleased when the father, László, showed Fischer an old chess book that described what appeared to be a forerunner of Fischer Random Chess. The book was written by Izidor Gross and published in 1910. Fischer then changed the rules of his variation in order to make it different. There are games of shuffle chess recorded as early as 1852 but Fischer is generally credited with the improvements of fixing the colors of bishops, placing the king between the rooks, and defining the castling process. In a later radio interview, Fischer explained his reasoning for proposing a revision of shuffle chess, rather than a game with new pieces (and a larger board), as the "new chess":

I love chess, and I didn't invent Fischerandom chess to destroy chess. I invented Fischerandom chess to keep chess going. Because I consider the old chess is dying, it really is dead. A lot of people come up with other rules of chess-type games, with 10×8 boards, new pieces, and all kinds of things. I'm really not interested in that. I want to keep the old chess flavor. I want to keep the old chess game. But just making a change so the starting positions are mixed, so it's not degenerated down to memorization and prearrangement like it is today.

— Radio Interview, June 27, 1999 (see 2:18–3:03) (also see here 39:04–39:49)

== Naming ==
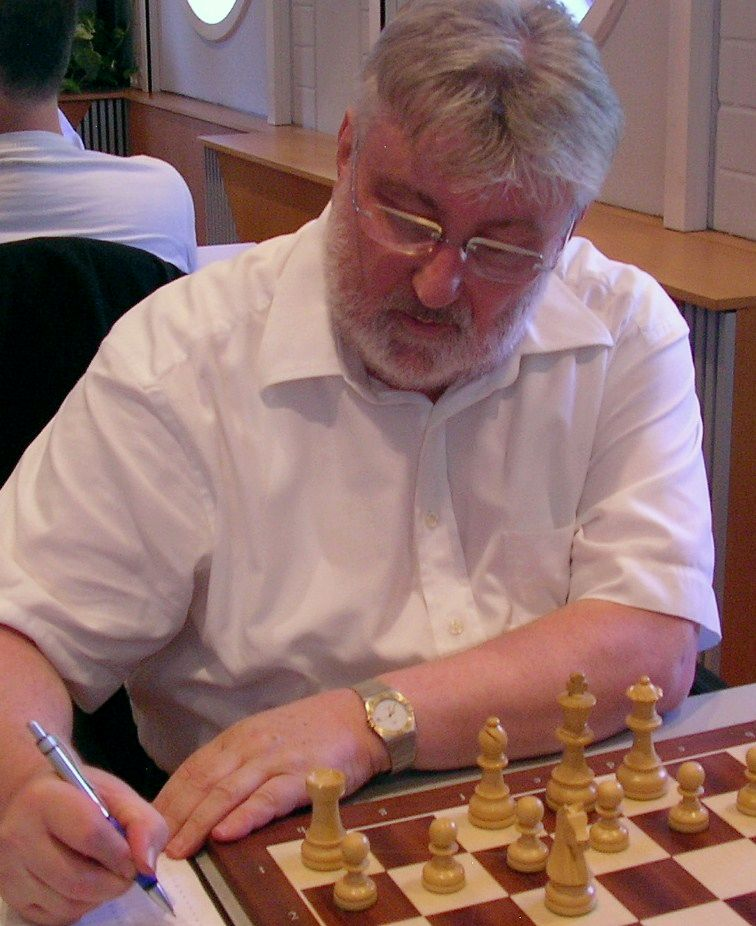
Hans-Walter Schmitt, Frankfurt 2011

The variant has held a number of different names. It was originally known as "Fischerandom Chess", the name given by Fischer, or "Fischerandom". In the FIDE Laws of Chess, it is called "Chess960".

The name "Chess960" was made by a brainstorming process led by Hans-Walter Schmitt, chairman of the Frankfurt Chess Tigers e.V. He started a brainstorming process for creating a new name, which had to meet the requirements of leading grandmasters; specifically, that it (a) should not contain part of the name of any grandmaster; (b) should not include negatively biased or "spongy" elements (such as "random" or "freestyle"); and (c) should be universally understood.

The name "Chess960" (pronounced "Chess nine-sixty") reflects the 960 possible starting positions in the game.

In conversations with Helgi Ólafsson, Bobby Fischer discussed the initiative that renamed the variant "Chess960" and remarked, "They believe my image is so bad that they have given it another name." Fischer later expressed that he liked the name "Chess960" and sometimes used the name.

Chess960 tournaments hosted by the Saint Louis Chess Club since 2019 are branded as "Chess 9LX", a name trademarked by the Saint Louis Chess Club, where the name is a combination of the Arabic numeral 9 and the Roman numerals LX (60).

The name "Freestyle chess", which is also a trademarked name, has been used by the Freestyle Chess G.O.A.T. Challenge and the Freestyle Chess Grand Slam Tour promoted by Magnus Carlsen and Jan Henric Buettner.

== Theory ==
Position: a8 black knight, b8 black knight, c8 black rook, d8 black king, e8 black bishop, f8 black rook, g8 black queen, h8 black bishop, a7 black pawn, b7 black pawn, c7 black pawn, d7 black pawn, e7 black pawn, f7 black pawn, g7 black pawn, h7 black pawn, a2 white pawn, b2 white pawn, c2 white pawn, d2 white pawn, e2 white pawn, f2 white pawn, g2 white pawn, h2 white pawn, a1 white knight, b1 white knight, c1 white rook, d1 white king, e1 white bishop, f1 white rook, g1 white queen, h1 white bishop

In this starting position, the players' a- and b-pawns are unguarded and subject to immediate attack if either player moves their f- or g-pawns, respectively.

The study of openings in Chess960 is in its infancy, but fundamental opening principles still apply, including: protect the king, control the central squares (directly or indirectly), and develop rapidly, starting with the less valuable pieces.

Unprotected pawns may also need to be dealt with quickly. Many starting positions have unprotected pawns, and some starting positions have up to two that can be attacked on the first move. For example, in some Chess960 starting positions (see diagram), White can attack an unprotected black pawn on the first move, whereas in classical chess it takes two moves for White to attack, and there are no unprotected pawns.

=== White's advantage ===
It has been argued that two games should be played from each starting position, with players alternating colors, since the advantage offered to White in some initial positions may be greater than in classical chess.

However, Sesse (which used Stockfish 9) evaluated the starting positions (SP) to be between 0.00 and 0.57, with an average of 0.18 advantage for White. BBNNRKRQ (SP 80) was the least balanced position with 0.57 advantage for White, while 27 different starting positions evaluate as equal, or 0.00 advantage for White or Black, for example BBRNNQKR (SP 432). The standard chess starting position RNBQKBNR (SP 518) was evaluated at 0.22 advantage for White. Hence, on average, a Chess960 starting position is actually 18.2% more balanced than the standard starting position.

== Tournaments ==
=== First tournaments ===
- 1996 – The first Fischer Random Chess tournament was held in Vojvodina, Yugoslavia, in April 1996, and was won by Peter Leko with 9½/11, ahead of Stanimir Nikolić with 9/11.
- June 30, 1996 – A 30 board friendly match was played in The Netherlands. On the top board, GM David Bronstein defeated IM Rudy Douven.
- 2006–present – The first Fischer Random Championships of the Netherlands was held by Fischer Z chess club and has since been held annually. Dimitri Reinderman has won this title for five years, champion in 2010, 2014, 2015, 2023 and 2024. Two grandmasters have won the title twice, Yasser Seirawan and Dennis de Vreugt.
- 2010 – In 2010 the US Chess Federation sponsored its first Chess960 tournament, at the Jerry Hanken Memorial US Open tournament in Irvine, California. This one-day event, directed by Damian Nash, saw a first-place tie between Larry Kaufman and Mark Duckworth, which Kaufman won on tiebreaks.
- 2012 – The British Chess960 Championship was held at the Mind Sports Olympiad, won by Ankush Khandelwal.
- 2018 – The first edition of the European Fischer Random Cup was held in Reykjavík on March 9, 2018, on Fischer's 75th birthday. It was won by Aleksandr Lenderman.
- 2019 – The Icelandic Chess Federation organized the European Fischer Random Championship on the rest day of 34th edition of The GAMMA Reykjavik Open on April 12, 2019. The tournament was won by the then 15-year-old Iranian prodigy Alireza Firouzja, a full point ahead of US's Andrew Tang, who was second on tiebreaks.
- 2024 – The European Chess Union organized the European Blitz, Rapid and Random (Chess960) Championships in Skopje, North Macedonia. The Chess960 championship, held on December 10, was won by Vladimir Fedoseev, who also won the Rapid championship.

=== Mainz Championships ===
Note: None of the Mainz championships were recognized by FIDE. Furthermore, they were all played with rapid time controls.

- 2001 – Peter Leko defeated Michael Adams 4½ to 3½ in an eight-game Fischer Random Chess match at the Mainz Chess Classic, in what was regarded as one of the earliest serious tests of the chess variant.
- 2002 – In 2002 at Mainz, an open tournament was held which was attended by 131 players, with Peter Svidler taking first place. Fischer Random Chess was selected as the April 2002 "Recognized Variant of the Month" by The Chess Variant Pages (ChessVariants.org). The book Shall We Play Fischerandom Chess? was published in 2002, authored by Yugoslavian grandmaster Svetozar Gligorić.
- 2003 – At the 2003 Mainz Chess Classic, Svidler beat Lékó in an eight-game match for the World Championship title by a score of 4½–3½. The Chess960 open tournament drew 179 players, including 50 grandmasters. It was won by Levon Aronian, the 2002 World Junior Champion. Svidler is the official first World New Chess Association (WNCA) world champion inaugurated on August 14, 2003, with Jens Beutel, Mayor of Mainz as the President and Hans-Walter Schmitt, Chess Classic organizer as Secretary. The WNCA maintains an own dedicated Chess960 rating list.
- 2004 – Aronian played Svidler for the title at the 2004 Mainz Chess Classic, losing 3½–4½. At the same tournament in 2004, Aronian played two Chess960 games against the Dutch computer chess program The Baron, developed by Richard Pijl. Both games ended in a draw. It was the first ever man against machine match in Chess960. Zoltán Almási won the Chess960 open tournament in 2004.

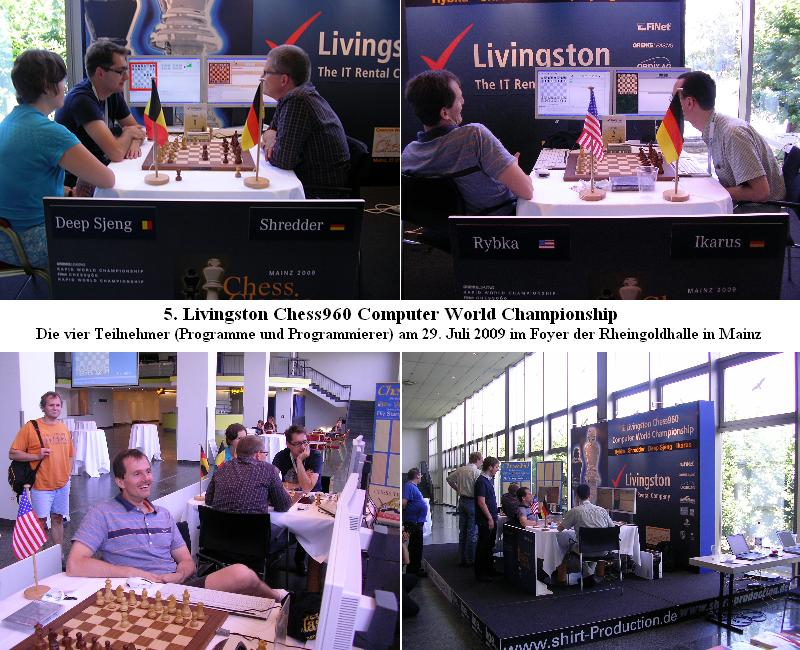
The four programs Deep Sjeng, Shredder, Rybka, and Ikarus (with the programmers) at the 5th Livingston Chess960 Computer World Championship, Mainz 2009

- 2005 – Almási and Svidler played an eight-game match at the 2005 Mainz Chess Classic. Once again, Svidler defended his title, winning 5–3. Levon Aronian won the Chess960 open tournament in 2005. During the Chess Classic 2005 in Mainz, initiated by Mark Vogelgesang and Eric van Reem, the first-ever Chess960 computer chess world championship was played. Nineteen programs, including the powerful Shredder, played in this tournament. As a result of this tournament, Spike became the first Chess960 computer world champion.
- 2006 – The 2006 Mainz Chess Classic saw Svidler defending his championship in a rematch against Levon Aronian. This time, Aronian won the match 5–3 to become the third ever Fischer Random Chess world champion. Étienne Bacrot won the Chess960 open tournament, earning him a title match against Aronian in 2007. Three new Chess960 world championship matches were held, in the women, junior and senior categories. In the women category, Alexandra Kosteniuk became the first Chess960 Women World Champion by beating Elisabeth Pähtz 5½ to 2½. The 2006 Senior Chess960 World Champion was Vlastimil Hort, and the 2006 Junior Chess960 World Champion was Pentala Harikrishna. Shredder won the computer championship, making it Chess960 computer world champion 2006.
- 2007 – In 2007 Mainz Chess Classic Aronian successfully defended his title of Chess960 World Champion over Viswanathan Anand, while Victor Bologan won the Chess960 open tournament. Rybka won the 2007 computer championship.
- 2008 – Hikaru Nakamura won the 2008 Finet Chess960 Open (Mainz).
- 2009 – The last Mainz tournament was held in 2009. Hikaru Nakamura won the Chess960 World Championship against Aronian, while Alexander Grischuk won the Chess960 open tournament.

Summary of Mainz Winners
Year	Championship	Open	Women's Championship	Computer Championship
2001	Péter Lékó (4½–3½ vs. Michael Adams)			
2002		Peter Svidler		
2003	Peter Svidler (4½–3½ vs. Péter Lékó)	Levon Aronian		
2004	Peter Svidler (4½–3½ vs. Levon Aronian)	Zoltán Almási		
2005	Peter Svidler (5–3 vs. Zoltán Almási)	Levon Aronian		Spike
2006	Levon Aronian (5–3 vs. Peter Svidler)	Étienne Bacrot	Alexandra Kosteniuk (5½–2½ vs. Elisabeth Pähtz)	Shredder
2007	Levon Aronian (2–2, 1½–½ vs. Viswanathan Anand)	Victor Bologan		Rybka
2008		Hikaru Nakamura	Alexandra Kosteniuk (2½–1½ vs. Kateryna Lahno)	Rybka
2009	Hikaru Nakamura (3½–½ vs. Levon Aronian)	Alexander Grischuk		Rybka

=== Computers ===
In 2005, chess program The Baron played two Fischer Random Chess games against Chess960 World Champion Peter Svidler, who won 1½–½. The chess program Shredder, developed by Stefan Meyer-Kahlen of Germany, played two games against Zoltán Almási from Hungary, where Shredder won 2–0.

TCEC has held TCEC FRC since 2019 where Stockfish has won every edition except the 2021 edition which was won by Komodo. Since 2022, they have also held tournaments for an additional variant called DFRC (Double Fischer Random Chess) or FRD (Fischer Random Double), which arrange the starting positions for White and Black separately instead of requiring them to be mirrored. There are thus 960 × 960 = 921,600 possible starting positions, and more potential for the positions to be unbalanced. These events have all been won by Stockfish.

=== Miscellaneous matches ===
From February 9 to 13, 2018, a Chess960 match between former classical World Chess Champion Magnus Carlsen and the unofficial Fischer Random Chess world champion Hikaru Nakamura was held in Høvikodden, Norway. The match consisted of 8 rapid and 8 blitz games, with the rapid games counting double. Each position was used in two games, with colors reversed. Carlsen prevailed with a score of 14–10.

=== Saint Louis Chess Club's Champions Showdown: Chess 9LX ===
2018 – From September 11 to 14, 2018, the Saint Louis Chess Club held a Chess960 event, but they did not yet call their event 'Chess 9LX'. (They started next year.) The playing format consisted of individual matches, each pair of players facing the same five different starting positions, with 6 rapid games (counting 2 points each) and 14 blitz games (counting 1 point each). Players and scores:

1. Veselin Topalov (14½–11½) defeated Garry Kasparov.
2. Hikaru Nakamura (14–12) defeated Peter Svidler.
3. Wesley So (14½–11½) defeated Anish Giri.
4. Maxime Vachier-Lagrave (17½–8½) defeated Sam Shankland.
5. Levon Aronian (17½–8½) defeated Leinier Domínguez.

2019 – The playing format once again consisted of individual matches. Players and scores:

1. Fabiano Caruana (19–7) defeated Garry Kasparov.
2. Wesley So (18–8) defeated Veselin Topalov.
3. Peter Svidler (15½–10½) defeated Leinier Domínguez Pérez.
4. Hikaru Nakamura (14½–11½) defeated Levon Aronian.

2020 – The playing format changed to a round robin. The event was won by both (There was no tiebreaker) former world (standard) chess champion Magnus Carlsen and Hikaru Nakamura. Magnus Carlsen and Hikaru Nakamura got 6/9. Fabiano Caruana and Levon Aronian got 5½/9. Wesley So scored 5/9, Maxime Vachier-Lagrave and Leinier Dominguez Perez got 4/9. Garry Kasparov scored 3½/9, Peter Svidler 3/9 and Alireza Firouzja 2½/9.

2021 – The playing format was a round robin with 10 players. The event was won by Leinier Domínguez Pérez.

2022 – The playing format was a round robin with 10 players. The event was won by Fabiano Caruana who defeated Alireza Firouzja in armageddon.

2023 – The playing format was a round robin with 10 players. Sam Sevian won with 7/9. Wesley So, Levon Aronian and Sam Shankland got 6/9. Fabiano Caruana scored 5½/9, Hikaru Nakamura 4/9, Jeffrey Xiong 3½/9, Garry Kasparov 3/9, Leinier Dominguez 2½/9 and Ray Robson 1½/9.

2024 – The playing format was a round robin with 10 players. The event was won by Fabiano Caruana.

=== FIDE World Championships 2019 and 2022 ===
On April 20, 2019, the first world championship in Fischer Random Chess officially recognized by FIDE was announced. It ended on November 2, 2019. In the finals, Wesley So defeated the former and four-time world chess champion Magnus Carlsen 13½–2½ (4 wins, 0 losses, 2 draws) to become the inaugural world Fischer Random Chess champion.

In the announcement, FIDE president Arkady Dvorkovich commented:

It is an unprecedented move that the International Chess Federation recognizes a new variety of chess, so this was a decision that required to be carefully thought out. But we believe that Fischer Random is a positive innovation: It injects new energies and enthusiasm into our game, but at the same time it doesn't mean a rupture with our classical chess and its tradition. It is probably for this reason that Fischer Random chess has won the favor of the chess community, including the top players and the world champion himself. FIDE couldn't be oblivious to that: It was time to embrace and incorporate this modality of chess.

On August 19, 2022, the second world championship was announced for later in 2022, in Iceland. This is exactly half a century after the World Chess Championship 1972 held in Iceland between Fischer and Boris Spassky. On October 30, Hikaru Nakamura played the finals against Ian Nepomniachtchi, who had earlier knocked out Magnus Carlsen. Nakamura won in the armageddon after drawing the match 2–2.

=== Freestyle Chess ===
The eight-player Freestyle Chess G.O.A.T. Challenge was the first major Chess960 tournament that used classical chess time controls. It took place in Germany from February 9–16, 2024. Fischer Random world champion Nakamura was reportedly invited, but did not play in the event. Magnus Carlsen won the tournament by defeating Fabiano Caruana in the finals.

Following the success of the first tournament, organizers Carlsen and Jan Henric Buettner launched the Freestyle Chess Grand Slam Tour in 2025, comprising five "Grand Slam" tournaments and one open tournament. The winner of the tour, Magnus Carlsen, was awarded the title of Freestyle Chess Champion.

The FIDE Freestyle Chess World Championship 2026 featured Carlsen, Levon Aronian, Fabiano Caruana, Vincent Keymer, Javokhir Sindarov, Arjun Erigaisi, Hans Niemann, and Nodirbek Abdusattorov. It took place February 13–15, 2026 with Carlsen defeating Caruana in the finals.

The Grenke Freestyle Chess Open is an annual open tournament, held at Karlsruhe, Germany. The 2025 edition was part of the Freestyle Grand Slam Tour, and was won by Carlsen with a score of 9/9. Vincent Keymer won the 2026 edition ahead of Maxime Vachier-Lagrave on tiebreaks.

== Coding games and positions ==
Recorded games must convey the Fischer Random Chess starting position. Games recorded using the Portable Game Notation (PGN) can record the initial position using Forsyth–Edwards Notation (FEN), as the value of the "FEN" tag. Castling is notated the same as in classical chess (except PGN requires letter O, not number 0). Note that not all chess programs can handle castling correctly in Fischer Random Chess games. To correctly record a Fischer Random Chess game in PGN, an additional "Variant" tag (not "Variation" tag, which has a different meaning) must be used to identify the rules; the rule named "Fischerandom" is accepted by many chess programs as identifying Fischer Random Chess, though "Chess960" should be accepted as well. This means that in a PGN-recorded game, one of the PGN tags (after the initial seven tags) would look like this: [Variant "Fischerandom"].

FEN is capable of expressing all possible starting positions of Fischer Random Chess; however, unmodified FEN cannot express all possible positions of a Chess960 game. In a game, a rook may move into the back row on the same side of the king as the other rook, or pawn(s) may be underpromoted into rook(s) and moved into the back row. If a rook is unmoved and can still castle, yet there is more than one rook on that side, FEN notation as traditionally interpreted is ambiguous. This is because FEN records that castling is possible on that side, but not which rook is still allowed to castle.

A modification of FEN, X-FEN, has been devised by Reinhard Scharnagl to remove this ambiguity. In X-FEN, the castling markings "KQkq" have their expected meanings: "Q" and "q" mean a-side castling is still legal (for White and Black respectively), and "K" and "k" mean h-side castling is still legal (for White and Black respectively). However, if there is more than one rook on the baseline on the same side of the king, and the rook that can castle is not the outermost rook on that side, then the file letter (uppercase for White) of the rook that can castle is used instead of "K", "k", "Q", or "q"; in X-FEN notation, castling potentials belong to the outermost rooks by default. The maximum length of the castling value is still four characters. X-FEN is upwardly compatible with FEN, that is, a program supporting X-FEN will automatically use the normal FEN codes for a traditional chess starting position without requiring any special programming. As a benefit, all 18 pseudo FRC positions (positions with traditional placements of rooks and king) still remain uniquely encoded.

The solution implemented by chess engines like Shredder and Fritz is to use the letters of the files on which the rooks began the game. This scheme is sometimes called Shredder-FEN. For the traditional setup, Shredder-FEN would use HAha instead of KQkq.

== Similar variants ==
There are several variants based on randomization of the initial setup. "Randomized Chess, in one or other of its many reincarnations, continues to attract support even, or perhaps especially, that of top players."

Summary
Variant	Under condition (and all of the above)	Positions with symmetry a1 to h1 = a8 to h8	Positions with symmetry a=h, b=g, c=f, d=e (king=queen)
Shuffle chess	Random	5040	48
Chess2880	Bishops opposite color	2880	48
Chess960	King between rooks	960	24

Remarks

Any variant with N starting positions can exist with mirroring (or rotating) white and black otherwise it means another (double) variant with N^{2} starting positions. In any variant the castling is not possible in any case or is possible only when king and rook are on their traditional starting squares, or as follows:

After castling with the nearest rook to the:

- h-file, the king will be in the g-file and the rook will be in the f-file.
- a-file, the king will be in the c-file and the rook will be in the d-file.

The double chess2880 without castling is known as Transcendental chess (or TC).

Chess18 is the subset of Chess960 in which the kings and rooks are fixed on the same positions as in the standard starting position (rooks on the a and h files; king on the e file). Due to this, castling always works as with orthodox rules, preserving more of the feel of ordinary chess. This allows some opening knowledge to still have practical relevance, as one could practically learn a few short lines for each of the eighteen starting positions, with the potential to be a much more significant aspect of the game than in Chess960 for top players, though it does not reach the extent of orthodox chess, in which memorizing many long computer lines is a common practice. However, Chess18 excludes all starting positions where White has a large advantage (such as corner squares with bishops), and makes early blunders less common by making it impossible for a bishop to attack an undefended pawn after White's first move. Further, due to the lower diversity in starting positions, Chess18 has much less positional diversity than is offered by Chess960. Chess18 positions are more likely than Chess960 positions to resemble structures found in traditional chess.

Lékó vs. Adams, 2001

Position: a8 black rook, b8 black king, c8 black bishop, d8 black rook, e8 black knight, f8 black bishop, g8 black queen, h8 black knight, a7 black pawn, b7 black pawn, c7 black pawn, d7 black pawn, e7 black pawn, f7 black pawn, g7 black pawn, h7 black pawn, a2 white pawn, b2 white pawn, c2 white pawn, d2 white pawn, e2 white pawn, f2 white pawn, g2 white pawn, h2 white pawn, a1 white rook, b1 white king, c1 white bishop, d1 white rook, e1 white knight, f1 white bishop, g1 white queen, h1 white knight

Starting position, game 4 ("Both players have bad positions." — Helmut Pfleger)

As discussed above in 'Castling rules', Chess870 and Chess90 are the partitioning subsets of Chess960 in which a player, respectively, never needs or may need to give up castling rights on one side to castle on the other side.

Chess480

In "Castling in Chess960: An appeal for simplicity", John Kipling Lewis proposes alternative castling rules which Lewis has named "Orthodox Castling".

The preconditions for castling are the same as in Chess960, but when castling,

... the king is transferred from its original square two squares towards (or over) the rook, then that rook is transferred to the square the king has just crossed (if it is not already there). If the king and rook are adjacent in a corner and the king cannot move two spaces over the rook, then the king and rook exchange squares.

Examples of Chess480 castling

Position: c8 black rook, f8 black king, h8 black rook, h2 white pawn, c1 white rook, f1 white king, h1 white rook

An initial position of kings and rooks

Position: d8 black king, e8 black rook, h8 black rook, h2 white pawn, c1 white rook, g1 white rook, h1 white king

White has castled h-side (0-0) and Black has castled a-side (0-0-0).

Unlike Chess960, the final position after castling in Chess480 will usually not be the same as the final position of a castling move in traditional chess. Lewis argues that this alternative better conforms to how the castling move was historically developed.

Lewis has named this chess variation "Chess480"; it follows the rules of Chess960 with the exception of the castling rules. Although a Chess480 game can start with any of 960 starting positions, the castling rules are symmetrical (whereas the Chess960 castling rules are not), so that mirror-image positions have identical strategies; thus there are only 480 effectively different positions. The number of starting positions could be reduced to 480 without losing any possibilities, for example by requiring the white king to start on a light (or dark) square.

There are other claims to the nomenclature "Chess480"; Reinhard Scharnagl defines it as the white queen is always to the left of the white king.

David O'Shaughnessy argues in "Castling in Chess480: An appeal for sanity" that the Chess480 rules are often not useful from a gameplay perspective. In about 66% of starting positions, players have the options of castling deeper into the wing the king started on, or castling into the center of the board (when the king starts on the b-, c-, f-, or g-files). An example of poor castling options is a position where the kings start on g1 and g8 respectively. There will be no possibility of "opposite-side castling" where each player's pawns are free to be used in pawn storms, as the kings' scope for movement is very restricted (it can only move to the h- or e-file). These "problem positions" play well with Chess960 castling rules.
