= FIDE World Fischer Random Chess Championship 2022 =

2022 world championship of a variation of chess

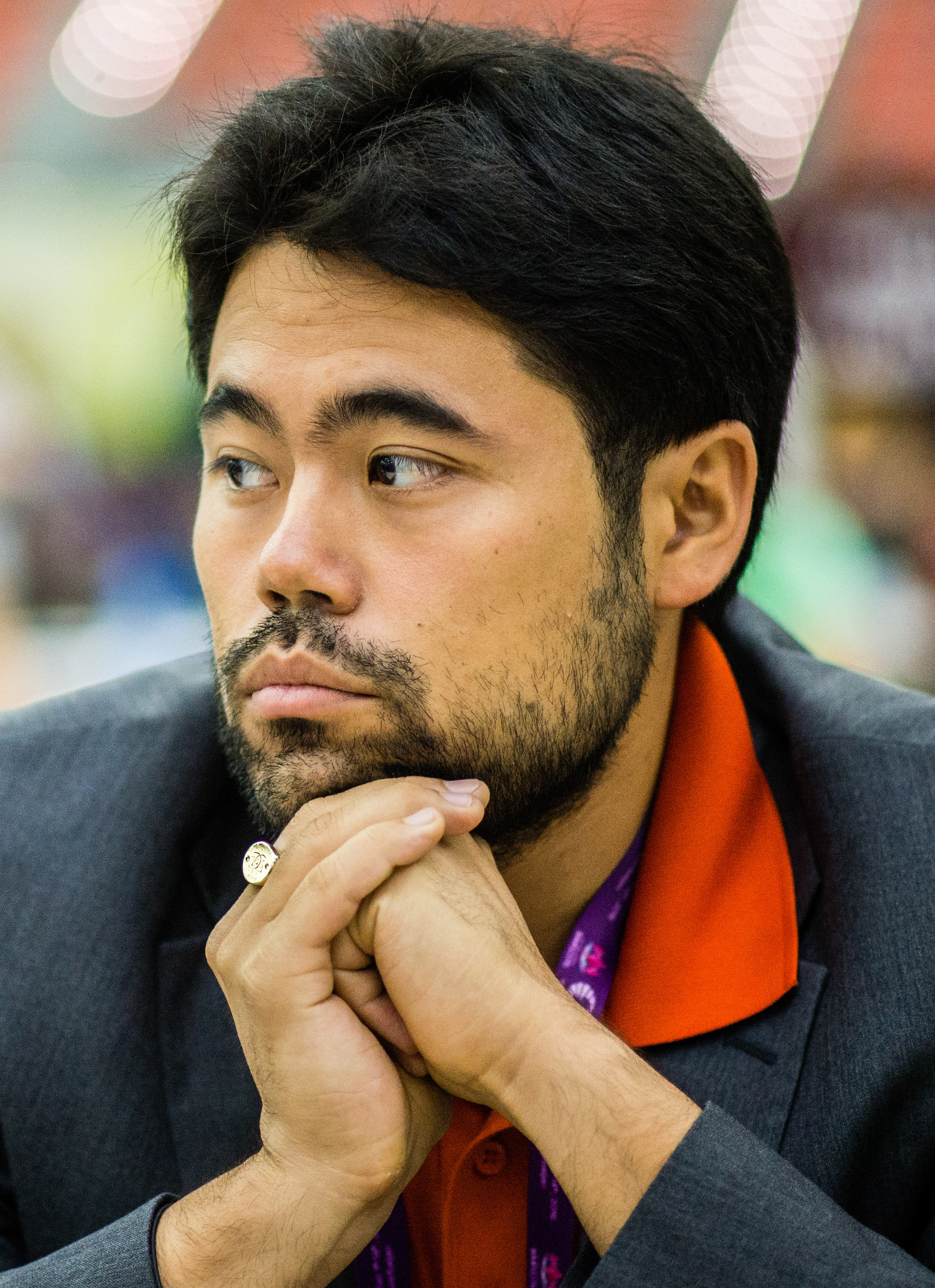
- Hikaru Nakamura, the winner of the FIDE World Fischer Random Chess Championship 2022.
- Venue: Qualifiers; Internet chess server Group stage, semifinals and finals: Berjaya Reykjavik Natura Hotel
- Location: Chess.com and Lichess (qualifiers); Reykjavík, Iceland (group stage, semifinals and finals)
- Dates: 19 August – 30 October 2022
- Website: www.frchess.com

Champion
- (United States) Hikaru Nakamura

The FIDE World Fischer Random Chess Championship 2022 (WFRCC) was the second official world championship in Fischer Random Chess (also known as Chess960). The competition followed a similar format to the first championship in 2019, with qualifying stages open to all interested participants taking place online on Chess.com and Lichess, and four qualified players joined four invited players in the over-the-board final, which took place at the Berjaya Reykjavik Natura Hotel in Reykjavík, Iceland from 25 to 30 October 2022.

The winner of the final was Hikaru Nakamura, defeating Ian Nepomniachtchi in armageddon after drawing the match 2-2. He is the second FIDE world champion in Fischer random chess.

== Players ==
There were four directly seeded players: defending Fischer random champion Wesley So, classical chess champion and Fischer random championship runner-up Magnus Carlsen, the strongest Icelandic grandmaster Hjorvar Steinn Gretarsson and Ian Nepomniachtchi who was chosen as the wild card by the FIDE President, Arkady Dvorkovich. They were joined by the four winners of the online qualifiers on Chess.com and Lichess, two from each site. The qualifiers started on August 19 on Lichess and on August 22 on chess.com.

The qualifiers for the World Championship were:

Qualification method	Player	Age	Rating	World ranking
Qualification method	Player	(October 2022)		
2019 World Fischer Random Champion	(United States) Wesley So	29	2774	5
2019 World Fischer Random Championship runner-up	(Norway) Magnus Carlsen	31	2856	1
Local Organizers' Wildcard	(Iceland) Hjörvar Steinn Grétarsson	29	2533	476
FIDE President's Wildcard	(FIDE) Ian Nepomniachtchi (Note: Russian players' flags were displayed as the FIDE flag, as Russian and Belarusian flags have been banned from FIDE-rated events in response to the Russian invasion of Ukraine.)	32	2793	3
Qualifier 1 of Chess.com	(FIDE) Vladimir Fedoseev	27	2688	51
Qualifier 2 of Chess.com	(Germany) Matthias Blübaum	25	2647	98
Qualifier 1 of Lichess	(Uzbekistan) Nodirbek Abdusattorov	18	2713	31
Qualifier 2 of Lichess	(United States) Hikaru Nakamura	34	2768	6

Since the seeding of participants of the group stage is based on their FIDE Rapid Rating from September 2022, below are the participants by rapid ratings for September 2022 and October 2022.

Player	Seed	Rapid Rating	World ranking	Rapid Rating	World ranking
Player	Seed	(September 2022)		(October 2022)	
(United States) Wesley So	1 (Note: As the 2019 Fischer Random Chess Champion, So played in the tournament as the first seed.)	2784	5	2784	6
(Norway) Magnus Carlsen	2	2834	1	2834	1
(United States) Hikaru Nakamura	3	2789	4	2789	5
(FIDE) Ian Nepomniachtchi	4	2779	6	2766	8
(FIDE) Vladimir Fedoseev	5	2739	13	2741	15
(Uzbekistan) Nodirbek Abdusattorov	6	2676	36	2676	38
(Germany) Matthias Blübaum	7	2587	Not given	2617	Not given
(Iceland) Hjörvar Steinn Grétarsson	8	2520	Not given	2520	Not given

== Qualifiers ==
=== Chess.com ===
All FIDE-titled players can participate in the Chess.com qualifiers. Each qualifier takes place over three days. On day 1, players compete in a nine-round Swiss tournament with a 10+2 time control, and the top-eight finishers advance to the knockout stage. On day 2, the players compete in two-game matches with a time control of 15+2 and the same starting position for both games. On day 3, the players compete in a four-game match with two different starting positions, two games per position. Players don't swap colors between games two and three. In the event of a tie, a single armageddon game with a bidding system is played in the same starting position. The higher-seeded player chooses if they play White or Black in the first game before seeing the starting position.

==== Qualifier 1 ====
The first qualifier was played from 22 to 24 August 2022. 100 players participated in the Swiss stage which was won by Samuel Sevian with 7.5 points. In the knockout final, Vladimir Fedoseev defeated Eric Hansen to qualify for the main event.

Quarterfinals (August 23)
(United States) Samuel Sevian (Note: Sevian won the quarterfinal as white in the Armageddon game.)	2
(Peru) Jose Martinez Alcantara	1
(Canada) Eric Hansen	2
(India) Vidit Gujrathi	0
(FIDE) Aleksandr Shimanov	0
(Ukraine) Olexandr Bortnyk	2
(FIDE) Vladimir Fedoseev	2
(Netherlands) Benjamin Bok	0

Semifinals (August 23)
(United States) Samuel Sevian	0
(Canada) Eric Hansen	2
(Ukraine) Olexandr Bortnyk	½
(FIDE) Vladimir Fedoseev	1½

Final (August 24)
(Canada) Eric Hansen	2
(FIDE) Vladimir Fedoseev (Note: Fedoseev won the quarterfinal as white in the Armageddon game.)	3

==== Qualifier 2 ====
The second qualifier was played from 29 to 31 August 2022. 75 players participated in the Swiss stage which was won by Pranav V with 7 points. In the knockout final, Matthias Blübaum defeated David Navara to qualify for the main event.

Quarterfinals (August 30)
(India) Pranav V	1
(United States) Daniel Naroditsky (Note: Naroditsky won the quarterfinal by a regular win as black in the Armageddon game.)	2
(Germany) Vincent Keymer	½
(Czech Republic) David Navara	1½
(FIDE) Alexey Sarana	1½
(Germany) Alexander Donchenko	½
(FIDE) Vladislav Kovalev	0
(Germany) Matthias Blübaum	2

Semifinals (August 30)
(United States) Daniel Naroditsky	½
(Czech Republic) David Navara	1½
(FIDE) Alexey Sarana	1
(Germany) Matthias Blübaum (Note: Blübaum won the semifinal after drawing as black in the Armageddon game.)	2

Final (August 31)
(Czech Republic) David Navara	1½
(Germany) Matthias Blübaum	2½

=== Lichess ===
Anyone can play in the Lichess qualifiers. The qualifiers follow a multi-stage format:

- Stage 1 (19 August - 4 September) involves two phases. First, multiple open-entry 3+2 arenas will be held over two weeks. The top 50 finishers in each arena will qualify for the second phase: a single 3+2 arena per qualifier, from which 500 players will advance to the next stage, per qualifier.
- Stage 2 (10-11 September) will also comprise two phases. First, the players will be divided into groups to play an 11-round, 5+2, Swiss tournament. The top 18 finishers in each group will join each other and 10 wildcard players to play a 9-round, 10+2, Swiss, from which the top 15 will advance to the final stage.
- In the final stage (17-25 September), One wildcard will be invited at this stage for each Qualifier, per the co-organisers’ discretion, to make up 16 players in each Qualifier. The players will play each other in knockout matches to determine who will be invited to play in the over-the-board finals in Reykjavik. Those who progress to this stage will also receive a share of a $2,500 prize fund, per qualifier.

==== Qualifier 1 ====
Uzbek grandmaster Nodirbek Abdusattorov won the first Lichess qualifier to qualify for the over-the-board final. This qualifier was the only among the 4 qualifiers to not have an armageddon game.

Round of 16 (September 17)
(Netherlands) Anish Giri	2
(Romania) Richárd Rapport	0
(India) Siva Mahadevan	0
(Canada) Eric Hansen	2
(Paraguay) Guillermo Vázquez	2
(India) Vignesh Balaji	0
(FIDE) Harshavardhan G B	½
(Uruguay) Georg Meier	1½
(Uzbekistan) Nodirbek Abdusattorov	1½
(Vietnam) Lê Quang Liêm	½
(Germany) Rasmus Svane	½
(Norway) Johan-Sebastian Christiansen	1½
(Ukraine) Olexandr Bortnyk	½
(Azerbaijan) Nijat Abasov	1½
(FIDE) Zhamsaran Tsydypov	1½
(Ukraine) Vladislav Bakhmatsky	½

Quarterfinals (September 17)
(Netherlands) Anish Giri	3
(Canada) Eric Hansen	1
(Paraguay) Guillermo Vázquez	½
(Uruguay) Georg Meier	1½
(Uzbekistan) Nodirbek Abdusattorov	1½
(Norway) Johan-Sebastian Christiansen	½
(Azerbaijan) Nijat Abasov	2½
(FIDE) Zhamsaran Tsydypov	1½

Semifinals (October 1)
(Netherlands) Anish Giri	1½
(Uruguay) Georg Meier	½
(Uzbekistan) Nodirbek Abdusattorov	3
(Azerbaijan) Nijat Abasov	1

Final (October 1)
(Netherlands) Anish Giri	2
(Uzbekistan) Nodirbek Abdusattorov	4
Third place
(Uruguay) Georg Meier	2
(Azerbaijan) Nijat Abasov	0

==== Qualifier 2 ====
American grandmaster Hikaru Nakamura won the second Lichess qualifier to qualify for the over-the-board final.

Round of 16 (September 18)
(United States) Daniel Naroditsky	1½
(Netherlands) Benjamin Bok	½
(United States) Gata Kamsky	2½
(Latvia) Nikita Meshkovs	1½
(United States) Andrew Tang	0
(FIDE) Andrey Esipenko	2
(United States) Jeffery Xiong	½
(FIDE) Alexander Grischuk	1½
(United States) Hikaru Nakamura	2
(United States) Andy Woodward	0
(Germany) Frederik Svane	½
(United States) Awonder Liang	1½
(United States) Samuel Sevian	2
(United States) Gabriel Bick	0
(Azerbaijan) Rauf Mamedov (Note: Mamedov won the 16th round as white in the Armageddon game.)	3
(Bulgaria) Kiril Georgiev	2

Quarterfinals (September 18)
(United States) Daniel Naroditsky	½
(United States) Gata Kamsky	1½
(FIDE) Andrey Esipenko	2½
(FIDE) Alexander Grischuk	1½
(United States) Hikaru Nakamura	1½
(United States) Awonder Liang	½
(United States) Samuel Sevian	1½
(Azerbaijan) Rauf Mamedov	½

Semifinals (September 25)
(United States) Gata Kamsky	2
(FIDE) Andrey Esipenko (Note: Esipenko won the 16th round as white in the Armageddon game.)	3
(United States) Hikaru Nakamura	2
(United States) Samuel Sevian	0

Final (September 25)
(FIDE) Andrey Esipenko	½
(United States) Hikaru Nakamura	2½
Third place
(United States) Gata Kamsky	1½
(United States) Samuel Sevian	½

== Organization ==
Eight-players are drawn into two groups with four players in each group base on their seeding. The format is a best-of-two double round-robin tournament, meaning there were 6 rounds with each player facing the others in their respective group four times: twice with the black pieces and twice with the white pieces. The format for matches in the knockout stage is a best-of-four series, with the use of Armageddon as a tiebreaker.

=== Regulations ===
The time control (for both the group stages and the knockouts) will be 25 minutes per player for the first 30 moves, after which each player will receive additional 5 minutes on the clock and an increment of 5 seconds per move starting from move 31. The position of the pieces will be revealed to the players 15 minutes before scheduled play, with the players able to consult a registered Second beforehand. Players will get 2 points for winning the two game mini match, 1 point each for a draw and 0 points for a loss. For example, a 1.5-0.5 mini match score will be listed as 2–0. There will be two such mini matches between each pair of players in the group.

In the event of a tie for qualification out of group stage, tie breaks will be applied in the following order:

1. Game Points
2. Head-to-head score among tied players
3. Armageddon where the players bid a maximum time of 15 mins and the lower bid gets to play with black pieces and draw odds while being able to seek advice from the second for 5 minutes before the game starts.

In the knockout stage, it will be best of four games with Armageddon as the tie-breaker.

=== Prize money ===
The total prize pool for the tournament is $400,000, which is distributed as follows:

Finish	Prize ($USD)
1st	$150,000
2nd	$85,000
3rd	$55,000
4th	$40,000
5th	$25,000
6th	$20,000
7th	$15,000
8th	$10,000

=== Schedule ===
Date	Day	Event
24 October 2022	Monday	Opening ceremony
25 October 2022	Tuesday	Group Stage Round 1–2
26 October 2022	Wednesday	Group Stage Round 3–4
27 October 2022	Thursday	Group Stage Round 5–6
28 October 2022	Friday	Rest day
29 October 2022	Saturday	Semifinals
30 October 2022	Sunday	Finals; Closing ceremony

== Results ==
=== Group stage ===
==== Group A ====
Rank	Player	Rapid rating October 2022	NOD		NEP		WSO		HJO		Pts	GP
1	Nodirbek Abdusattorov (UZB)	2676			2	2	2	0	2	2	10	10
2	Ian Nepomniachtchi (FIDE)	2766	0	0			1	2	2	2	7	7
3	Wesley So (USA)	2784	0	2	1	0			2	1	6	5.5
4	Hjörvar Steinn Grétarsson (ISL)	2520	0	0	0	0	0	1			1	1.5

==== Group B ====
Rank	Player	Rapid rating October 2022	CAR		NAK		FED		BLU		Pts	GP
1	Magnus Carlsen (NOR)	2834			0	1	2	2	2	2	9	8
2	Hikaru Nakamura (USA)	2789	2	1			1	1	2	2	9	7.5
3	Vladimir Fedoseev (FIDE)	2741	0	0	1	1			2	1	5	5.5
4	Matthias Blübaum (GER)	2617	0	0	0	0	0	1			1	3

==== Summary ====
===== Day 1 =====
Day 1A pairing	1	2	GP	Pts
Day 1A pairing	Rapid		GP	Pts
(Iceland) Hjörvar Steinn Grétarsson	½	0	0.5	0
(United States) Wesley So	½	1	1.5	2
(Uzbekistan) Nodirbek Abdusattorov	1	1	2	2
(FIDE) Ian Nepomniachtchi	0	0	0	0
(Germany) Matthias Blübaum	0	½	0.5	0
(United States) Hikaru Nakamura	1	½	1.5	2
(Norway) Magnus Carlsen	1	½	1.5	2
(FIDE) Vladimir Fedoseev	0	½	0.5	0
Starting position	629	629		

Day 1B pairing	1	2	GP	Pts
Day 1B pairing	Rapid		GP	Pts
(FIDE) Ian Nepomniachtchi	1	1	2	2
(Iceland) Hjörvar Steinn Grétarsson	0	0	0	0
(United States) Wesley So	½	0	0.5	0
(Uzbekistan) Nodirbek Abdusattorov	½	1	1.5	2
(FIDE) Vladimir Fedoseev	1	½	1.5	2
(Germany) Matthias Blübaum	0	½	0.5	0
(United States) Hikaru Nakamura	½	1	1.5	2
(Norway) Magnus Carlsen	½	0	0.5	0
Starting position	295	295		

On day 1, Abdusattorov defeated Nepomniachtchi in 22 moves in the first game after sacrificing his knight for initiative on move 12 and proceeded to win the mini match too. In the first game against So, Abdusattorov defended a rook vs knight and bishop endgame with queens and pawns for each side where he also had to deal with a passed flank pawn for 56 moves where eventually they agreed to a draw on move 82 while he won the second game with relatively clean technique and subsequently the mini match too.

Carlsen also defeated Fedoseev in 25 moves in the first game but blundered the exchange for a pawn on move 26 of the second game. However, Carlsen managed to create a fortress and secured a draw and subsequently the match victory. After drawing the first game against Nakamura where he had offered a bishop sacrifice on move 1 which was not accepted since the queen could eventually be trapped after capturing the bishop, Carlsen again inexplicably blundered a full rook on move 31 of the second game from a slightly better position and resigned 15 moves later, thereby losing the match. Abdusattorov and Nakamura finished the day as the sole leaders of their respective groups with perfect scores.

===== Day 2 =====
Day 2A pairing	1	2	GP	Pts
Day 2A pairing	Rapid		GP	Pts
(Iceland) Hjörvar Steinn Grétarsson	0	0	0	0
(Uzbekistan) Nodirbek Abdusattorov	1	1	2	2
(United States) Wesley So	1	0	1	1
(FIDE) Ian Nepomniachtchi	0	1	1	1
(Germany) Matthias Blübaum	0	0	0	0
(Norway) Magnus Carlsen	1	1	2	2
(United States) Hikaru Nakamura	½	½	1	1
(FIDE) Vladimir Fedoseev	½	½	1	1
Starting position	362	362		

Day 2B pairing	1	2	GP	Pts
Day 2B pairing	Rapid		GP	Pts
(Uzbekistan) Nodirbek Abdusattorov	1	1	2	2
(Iceland) Hjörvar Steinn Grétarsson	0	0	0	0
(FIDE) Ian Nepomniachtchi	1	1	2	2
(United States) Wesley So	0	0	0	0
(Norway) Magnus Carlsen	½	1	1.5	2
(Germany) Matthias Blübaum	½	0	0.5	0
(FIDE) Vladimir Fedoseev	½	½	1	1
(United States) Hikaru Nakamura	½	½	1	1
Starting position	1	1		

On day 2, So was again in middle of a 106 move game but unlike the Abdusattorov game where the latter was under 1 minute with increment for last 30 moves, Nepomniachtchi still had over 9 minutes left when the inaccuracies piled up from move 73. So converted the extra pawn in queen vs queen endgame with pawns for each side to a victory but Nepomniachtchi won the second game of the match and they both received 1 point. In their second match, So blundered thinking that he could castle while being under check since final and initial position of the king are the same and rook will block the check adding that "I think Magnus thought the same", but he resigned after a discussion with the arbiter. FIDE Laws of Chess state that a necessary condition for castling to be legal is that the initial square, final square and the path of the king to the castling square should not be obstructed or be under attack. He lost the next game as well by choosing not to go into a theoretically drawn rook vs rook and knight endgame and subsequently the match as well. Fischer's original "Rules of FischerRandom" also state you cannot castle out of check.

Fedoseev after drawing his first game against Nakamura, sacrificed his knight on move 18 but Nakamura gave the sacrificed knight back in a favourable way and game was eventually agreed to a draw and the match as well. In their second match, after drawing the first game, Fedoseev sacrificed a pawn and the exchange to threaten perpetual check and more from a significantly worse position but Nakamura was not willing to run his king up the board and offered a draw on the next move which was accepted and thereby the match was drawn as well. Abdusattorov being the only player in any group with a perfect score, qualified for the semi-finals whereas Nakamura and Carlsen finished the day as group leaders.

===== Day 3 =====
Day 3A pairing	1	2	GP	Pts
Day 3A pairing	Rapid		GP	Pts
(United States) Wesley So	0	1	1	1
(Iceland) Hjörvar Steinn Grétarsson	1	0	1	1
(FIDE) Ian Nepomniachtchi	0	0	0	0
(Uzbekistan) Nodirbek Abdusattorov	1	1	2	2
(United States) Hikaru Nakamura	1	½	1.5	2
(Germany) Matthias Blübaum	0	½	0.5	0
(FIDE) Vladimir Fedoseev	½	0	0.5	0
(Norway) Magnus Carlsen	½	1	1.5	2
Starting position	378	378		

Day 3B pairing	1	2	GP	Pts
Day 3B pairing	Rapid		GP	Pts
(Iceland) Hjörvar Steinn Grétarsson	0	0	0	0
(FIDE) Ian Nepomniachtchi	1	1	2	2
(Uzbekistan) Nodirbek Abdusattorov	0	½	0.5	0
(United States) Wesley So	1	½	1.5	2
(Germany) Matthias Blübaum	0	1	1	1
(FIDE) Vladimir Fedoseev	1	0	1	1
(Norway) Magnus Carlsen	½	½	1	1
(United States) Hikaru Nakamura	½	½	1	1
Starting position	385	385		

On day 3, Abdusattorov again defeated Nepomniachtchi in 31 moves in their first game while he took 29 moves to win in their second game where the latter had all his pieces except the queen within the 4*2 a7-d8 rectangle by move 23. In his first game against Gretarsson, So blundered forced mate in three moves in a drawn two pawns vs knight endgame with queens for each side and won the second game to receive one point and subsequently Gretarsson also received his first point of the tournament. Carlsen failed to find forced mate in 6 on move 42 of his first game against Fedoseev in a rook and queen vs rook and queen endgame with pawns for each side, and Fedoseev proceeded to sacrifice all his major pieces to set up stalemate and draw the game but Carlsen won the second game and subsequently the match to qualify for the semi-finals. Nepomniachtchi and Nakamura won their matches against Gretarsson and Blübaum respectively to qualify for the semi-finals as well. After losing the first game against Fedoseev, Blübaum received his first point in second game of the match where Fedoseev blundered and flagged in a rook and knight vs rook, knight and pawn endgame on move 82.

It was revealed that while Carlsen brought Peter Heine Nielsen, Nepomniachtchi brought Nikita Vitiugov, Fedoseev brought Alexander Donchenko and Gretarsson brought Helgi Ólafsson as the registered seconds for consultation of 15 mins after the reveal of position, Abdusattorov, Blübaum, Nakamura and So did not register seconds and the latter two worked as a team while the first two sat alone at the board for preparation.

=== Semifinals ===
Player	1	2	3	4	TB	Total
Player	Rapid				Armageddon	Total
(United States) Hikaru Nakamura	1	1	1	Not required		3
(Uzbekistan) Nodirbek Abdusattorov	0	0	0	Not required		0
(FIDE) Ian Nepomniachtchi	0	1	1	1	Not required	3
(Norway) Magnus Carlsen	1	0	0	0	Not required	1
Starting position	187	187	317	317		

The semifinal matches produced a notable upset as Ian Nepomniachtchi defeated reigning classical world champion Magnus Carlsen. In their first game Nepomniachtchi was in trouble early as Carlsen missed a win just before the 25-minute time control. The game proceeded to time trouble for both players but Carlsen prevailed in a tense and dramatic ending. After this tough loss Nepomniachtchi rebounded with three straight wins. Carlsen blundered early in the second game and then defended well, but Nepomniachtchi eventually prevailed. The opening position for the third and fourth games featured all the knights in corners of the board, producing problems for the players in the first phase of the game. Carlsen went pawn-grabbing in the third game but this allowed a deadly attack against his king by Nepomniachtchi. Facing a must-win situation in the fourth game Carlsen blundered again as he tried to create risky complications. Nepomniachtchi capitalized to win the match 3-1. In the other match Hikaru Nakamura had a much easier time against Nodirbek Abdusattorov. The first game did get off to a rocky start for the American grandmaster but he defended tenaciously and won when Abdusattorov became too optimistic about his chances. The second game was a much smoother win for Nakamura, and though he tried dubious opening play in the third game, he punished some inaccuracies from Abdusattorov to secure a 3-0 match win.

=== First, third, fifth, and seventh place matches ===
Place	Player	1	2	3	4	TB	Total
Place	Player	Rapid				Armageddon	Total
First	(FIDE) Ian Nepomniachtchi	0	½	1	½	Loss	2
First	(United States) Hikaru Nakamura	1	½	0	½	Win	2
Third	(Uzbekistan) Nodirbek Abdusattorov	1	0	0	0	Not required	1
Third	(Norway) Magnus Carlsen	0	1	1	1	Not required	3
Fifth	(FIDE) Vladimir Fedoseev	½	½	1	1	Not required	3
Fifth	(United States) Wesley So	½	½	0	0	Not required	1
Seventh	(Iceland) Hjörvar Steinn Grétarsson	0	½	½	0	Not required	1
Seventh	(Germany) Matthias Blübaum	1	½	½	1	Not required	3
Starting position		582	582	347	347	915	

The final match between Hikaru Nakamura and Ian Nepomniachtchi for the championship was a memorable affair that went down to an Armageddon game. In the first game of the match Nepomniachtchi fell into time trouble and got tangled in difficult complications, which Nakamura exploited for a convincing win. The second game ended in a draw by repetition, though Nakamura could have pressed his advantageous position. Nepomniachtchi came back with a brilliant sacrificial win in the third game to even the match after Nakamura neglected king safety for too long. The players agreed to a quick draw in the fourth game and went to an Armageddon tiebreak to determine the championship. Nepomniachtchi bid 13 minutes and thus gained draw odds with the black pieces. The Russian grandmaster held the advantage early on and missed a winning chance. Nakamura rebounded with sharp play to create activity for his pieces and then won material on the way to the decisive win and the world championship title. The third, fifth and seventh place matches all ended in 3-1 scorelines. Magnus Carlsen took third place by winning three straight games against Nodirbek Abdusattorov after dropping the first game of the match. Vladimir Fedoseev beat Wesley So for fifth place and Matthias Blübaum defeated local favorite Hjorvar Steinn Gretarsson for seventh place.
