= World Chess960 Championship =

Chess variant tournament

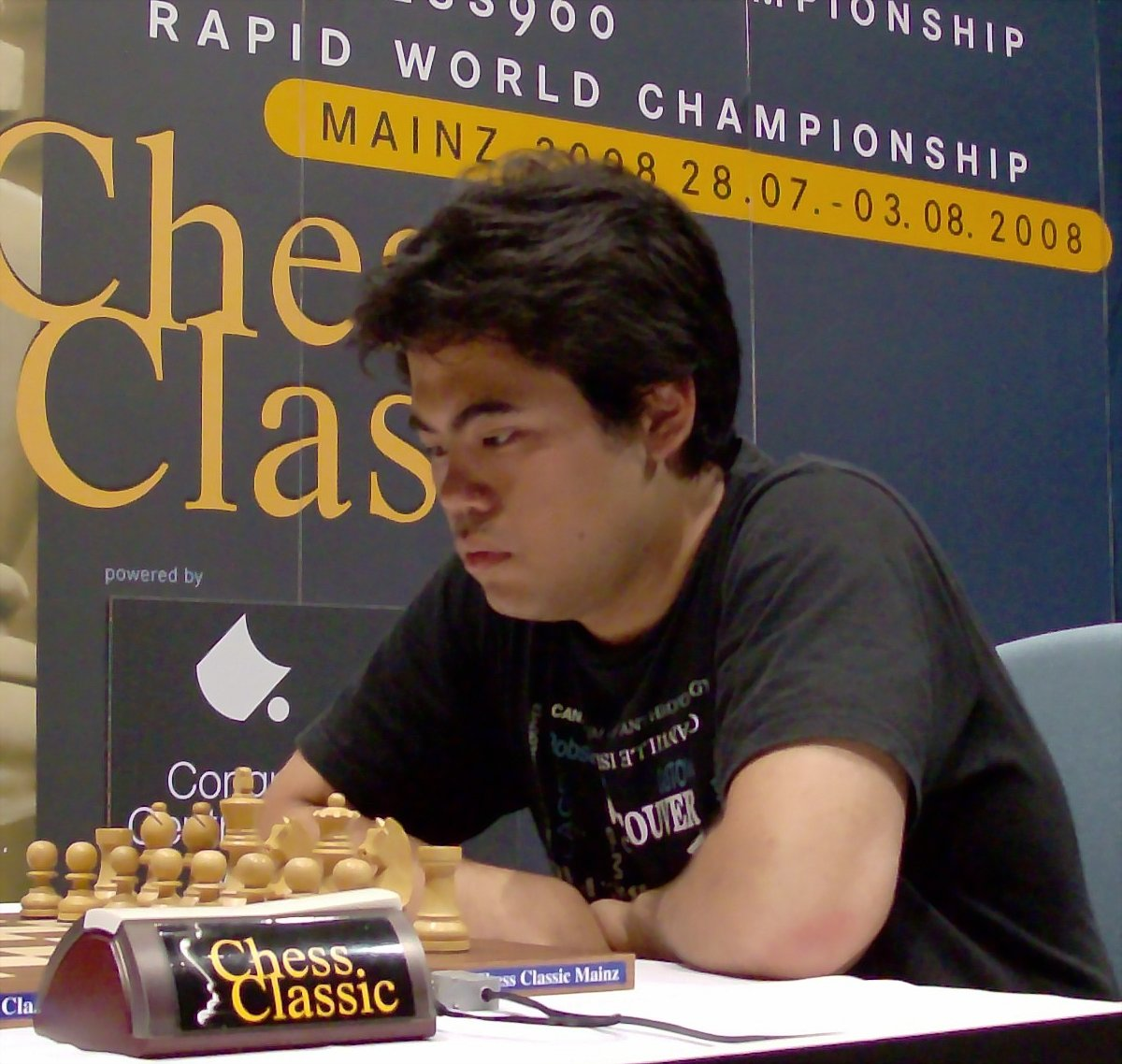
2009 World Chess960 champion Hikaru Nakamura at Mainz

The World Chess960 Championship is a match or tournament held to determine a world champion in Chess960 (also known as Fischer random chess), a popular chess variant in which the positions of pieces on the players' home ranks are randomized with certain constraints. Prior to 2019 FIDE did not recognize a Chess960 world champion or sponsor regular tournaments in the format, but the Chess Classic at Mainz and other non-FIDE affiliated organizations have hosted high-profile Chess960 tournaments and matches. Time controls for Chess960 are non-standardized, and usually conform to the wishes of the tournament sponsor or organizer. As a result, Chess960 championships have been held with irregular time controls ranging from rapid (Mainz) to blitz and bullet.

FIDE has organized or co-organized three world championships: in 2019, won by Wesley So; in 2022, won by Hikaru Nakamura; and in 2026, won by Magnus Carlsen.

== Background ==
The concept of Fischerandom chess originated as a proposal by former world champion Bobby Fischer, who initially presented it as a variant of shuffle chess and placed constraints on the possible positions in order to improve playability and reduce the chances of an unbalanced opening position. Fischer revealed the variant to the world on June 19, 1996, in Buenos Aires, Argentina, naming it 'Fischerandom' as a portmanteau of his name and the word 'random'. The goal of the game, as stated by Fischer, was to eliminate reliance on preparation and the memorization of various openings, and emphasize creativity and talent. Although the planned match between Eugene Torre and Pablo Ricardi, intended to showcase the new format, was canceled after a dispute between Fischer and the organizers, the variant quickly grew in popularity. That very same year, the first-ever Fischer Random chess tournament was held in Kanjiza, Yugoslavia. The tournament was not a world-class event, however, and it was not until 2001 that stronger matches/tournaments began to be held in the format.

== 1996 tournament ==
The first international Fischer Random tournament was held in Kanjiza, a small town in Serbia near the border of Hungary. The tournament was a 12-player round robin, and utilized a mix of rapid and blitz time controls – 25 minutes for the first 20 moves, and 5 minutes for the remainder of the game. Due to the irregular time controls, several players lost on time, and the quality of the games was thought to have suffered as a result. A set of four dice was used to randomly determine the starting position of the pieces prior to each game.

The tournament was won by the 17-year-old Peter Leko, one of the two grandmasters participating in the event. Leko, who was born in the nearby town of Subotica, scored 9½/11 to win the tournament by a half-point over Yugoslavian grandmaster Stanimir Nikolic

| Rk | Player | Rtg | Pts |
|---|---|---|---|
| 1 | Peter Leko (HUN) | 2625 | 9½ |
| 2 | Stanimir Nikolic (YUG) | 2345 | 9 |
| 3 | Goran Vojinovic (YUG) | 2425 | 7 |
| 4 | Ervin Mozes (ROM) | 2415 | 6½ |
| 5 | Gaspar Mathe (HUN) | 2400 | 6½ |
| 6 | Vladimir Milosevic (CZE) | 2285 | 6 |
| 7 | Tibor Farkas (HUN) | 2235 | 5½ |
| 8 | Stevan Popov (YUG) | 2315 | 4½ |
| 9 | Mirko Mamuzic (YUG) | 2255 | 4 |
| 10 | Lajos Ibel (HUN) | NR | 3½ |
| 11 | Vojislav Petrovic (YUG) | 2305 | 2 |
| 12 | Sandor Lerinc (YUG) | NR | 2 |

== 2001-2009 FiNet Chess960 World Championship at Mainz ==
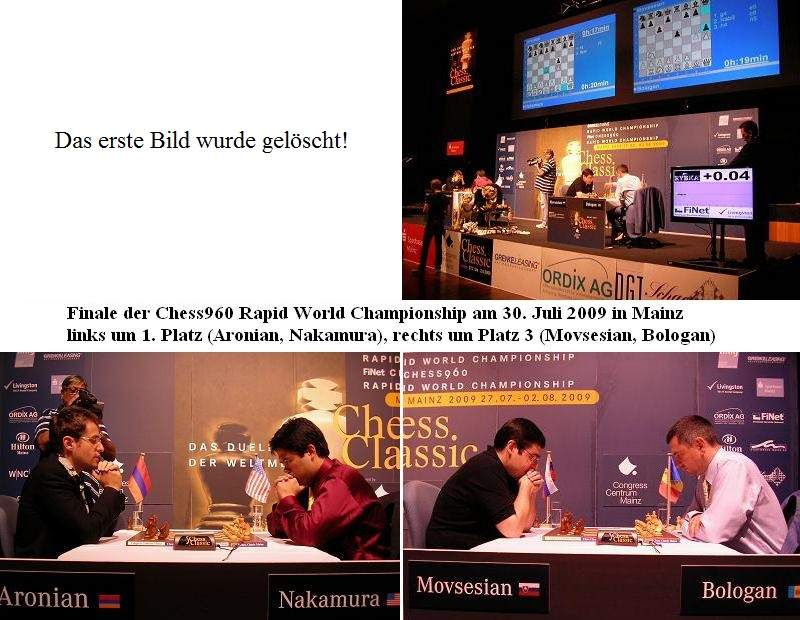
Levon Aronian faces Hikaru Nakamura for the 2009 Chess960 World Championship (left)

In 2001, the first Fischer Random World Championship was held at the Chess Classic in Mainz, Germany. The brainchild of Hans-Walter Schmitt, the Chess Classic featured top-ranked players playing rapid and FischeRandom chess games against computers as well as each other. The first edition of the Fischer Random event was an eight-game match between Peter Leko and Michael Adams, and was originally not billed as a 'World Championship' (although this billing would apply to future events, following the inauguration of the World New Chess Association in 2003). Both participants were selected by the organizers – Leko for his experience in Chess960 tournaments, and Adams for his skill in rapid chess. The match, which was eventually won by Leko, was played under standard rapid time controls of 25 minutes per player.

Subsequent editions of the championship were held in a format similar to that of the concurrent Rapid World Championship at Mainz. A strong open tournament featuring potential contenders for the world title was held, and the winner of the tournament would receive a chance to challenge the reigning champion in an eight-game match next year. Subsequently, the reigning champion would play a championship match against the winner of the previous open tournament. In 2007, the format of the championship was changed to a double-round robin, with the top two finishers advancing to a final match. Over the nine-year span of the event, four different grandmasters captured the world title – Leko, Peter Svidler, Levon Aronian, and Hikaru Nakamura.

In addition to the Chess960 Open and Chess960 Championship match, separate Chess960 Women's Championship matches was held in 2006 and 2008. Russian grandmaster Alexandra Kosteniuk won both matches, defeating Elisabeth Pähtz and Kateryna Lahno.

The event came to an end in 2010 when the funding for the Chess Classic was withdrawn.

| Year | Format | Champion | Runner-up | Score | Open Winner | Women's Champion | Women's Runner-up | Score | Computer Champion |
|---|---|---|---|---|---|---|---|---|---|
| 2001 | Matchplay (8 games) | Peter Leko (HUN) | Michael Adams (ENG) | 4½–3½ | N/A | N/A | N/A | N/A | N/A |
| 2002 | Open tournament | N/A | N/A | N/A | Peter Svidler (RUS) | N/A | N/A | N/A | N/A |
| 2003 | Matchplay (8 games) | Peter Svidler (RUS) | Peter Leko (HUN) | 4½–3½ | Levon Aronian (ARM) | N/A | N/A | N/A | N/A |
| 2004 | Matchplay (8 games) | Peter Svidler (RUS) | Levon Aronian (ARM) | 4½–3½ | Zoltán Almási (HUN) | N/A | N/A | N/A | Spike |
| 2005 | Matchplay (8 games) | Peter Svidler (RUS) | Zoltán Almási (HUN) | 5–3 | Levon Aronian (ARM) | N/A | N/A | N/A | Shredder |
| 2006 | Matchplay (8 games) | Levon Aronian (ARM) | Peter Svidler (RUS) | 5–3 | Etienne Bacrot (FRA) | Alexandra Kosteniuk | Elisabeth Pähtz | 5½–2½ | Rybka |
| 2007 | Double round-robin/final | Levon Aronian (ARM) | Viswanathan Anand (IND) | 2–2^{1} | Victor Bologan (MDA) | N/A | N/A | N/A | Rybka |
| 2008 | Open tournament | N/A | N/A | N/A | Hikaru Nakamura (USA) | Alexandra Kosteniuk | Kateryna Lahno | 2½–1½ | Rybka |
| 2009 | Double round-robin/final | Hikaru Nakamura (USA) | Levon Aronian (ARM) | 3½–½ | Alexander Grischuk (RUS) | N/A | N/A | N/A | Rybka |

^{1} Blitz tiebreaks used to settle the outcome.

== 2018 'Unofficial' World Championship Match ==
Beginning on February 9, 2018, reigning Chess960 champion Hikaru Nakamura was slated to play a 16-game Chess960 exhibition match against the then-world champion Magnus Carlsen at the Henie Onstad Kunstsenter in Bærum, Norway. The match was announced by Jøran Aulin-Jansson, president of the Norwegian Chess Federation, in October 2017 as a supporting program for an ongoing art exhibition Dag Alveng – Still Time at the Henie Onstad museum. Time controls for the match were categorized as 'slow-rapid' and 'fast-rapid'; players are given 45 minutes for 40 moves plus 15 minutes afterwards for the first eight games, and 10 minutes plus a five-second increment for the final eight games. Slow-rapid games were to be weighted twice as heavily as their fast-rapid counterparts. Carlsen won the match with a 14–10 score.

== FIDE World Fischer Random Championship ==
=== 2019 ===
FIDE, Chess.com, and Dund A.S. announced plans for a formal Chess960 world championship tournament to be held with online qualifiers, followed by over-the-board semifinal matches and a final match in Norway in fall 2019, with a prize fund of $375,000. Grandmasters who confirmed their participation in the event included Magnus Carlsen, Hikaru Nakamura, Fabiano Caruana, Wesley So, Alexander Grischuk, Ian Nepomniachtchi and Peter Svidler. Chess.com conducted online qualifying events open to these and other players.

FIDE president Arkady Dvorkovich commented: "It is an unprecedented move that the International Chess Federation recognizes a new variety of chess, so this was a decision that required to be carefully thought out. But we believe that Fischer Random is a positive innovation: It injects new energies and enthusiasm into our game, but at the same time it doesn't mean a rupture with our classical chess and its tradition. It is probably for this reason that Fischer Random chess has won the favor of the chess community, including the top players and the world champion himself. FIDE couldn't be oblivious to that: It was time to embrace and incorporate this modality of chess."

After a number of online qualifying events, four players competed in the over-the-board semifinals and final of the championship, held in Bærum, Norway from October 27 to November 2, 2019: So, Carlsen, Caruana, and Nepomniachtchi. (Carlsen was seeded directly into the semifinals and did not have to qualify through online play.) So defeated Nepomniachtchi and Carlsen defeated Caruana in the semifinals. So then beat Carlsen in the final match to win the championship. Nepomniachtchi beat Caruana in the consolation match to determine the third-place finisher. The matches were played at a combination of slow rapid, fast rapid and blitz time controls.

=== 2022 ===
Hikaru Nakamura won the championship in 2022, defeating Ian Nepomniachtchi in an armageddon match after drawing the final game 2-2. Grandmasters who participated included So, the defending champion, Carlsen, the runner-up, wild cards Hjörvar Steinn Grétarsson and Nepomniachtchi, and internet qualifiers Vladimir Fedoseev, Matthias Blübaum, Nodirbek Abdusattorov and Nakamura.

The championship took place at the Berjaya Reykjavik Natura Hotel in Reykjavík, Iceland, the residence of Fischer random chess's namesake Bobby Fischer during the later period of his life, and the host country of the infamous World Chess Championship 1972 between Fischer and Boris Spassky.

During the championships, Wesley So blundered believing he could castle out of check in the chess variant to avoid losing material, which resulted in his loss against Nepomniachtchi.

=== 2024 (cancelled) ===
In August 2023, FIDE called for bids for a 2024 Fischer Random championship in February 2024, with the same format as the 2022 edition. However the event never took place.

== FIDE Freestyle Chess World Championship ==
In 2025, Freestyle Chess Operations launched the Freestyle Chess Grand Slam Tour, a series of Chess960 tournaments. It consisted of five "Grand Slam" tournaments following a format similar to the Freestyle Chess G.O.A.T. Challenge, held in 2024. Players scored points based on placement in each event, with the player with the highest score at the end of the year becoming the Freestyle Chess Champion.

On December 21, 2024, the Freestyle Chess Players Club issued a press release on Twitter stating an agreement on a "friendly co-existence" with FIDE, and ongoing discussions "regarding the mutual recognition of future World Championship titles". FIDE President Arkady Dvorkovich replied stating that the press release "includes significant inaccuracies that mispresent the situation" and that FIDE will issue a further statement on the matter.

On December 11, 2025, following Magnus Carlsen's win at the Freestyle Chess Grand Slam Tour, FIDE President Arkady Dvorkovich announced that "FIDE recognizes [Carlsen] now as the unambiguous number one in the world in this exciting version of chess."

=== 2026 ===
On January 7, 2026, FIDE and Freestyle Chess announced the FIDE Freestyle Chess World Championship 2026, the third official World Chess960 Championship. The tournament took place at the Schloss Weissenhaus resort in Wangels, Germany from 13 to 15 February 2026. The Freestyle Chess Grand Slam Tour served as a qualification path for this World Championship. It was won by Magnus Carlsen.
