= Gabriel Bick =

American chess player (born 1999)

Personal information
- Born: March 4, 1999 (age 27) Davis, California

Chess career
- Country: United States
- Title: International Master (2020)
- Peak rating: 2419 (April 2018)

Gabriel James Koop Bick is an American chess player.

== Chess career ==
In October 2011, he won the under 1800 rating section of the Western States Chess Open.

In June 2017, he tied for third place with grandmaster Enrico Sevillano, Jack Zhu, Siddharth Banik, and Ivan Ke in the Bay Area Chess Championship. He notably held Sevillano to a draw during the event.

In February 2020, he played on board 1 for the Berkeley Chess School in the National Amateur Team West Championships. He won the bronze medal for board 1 players.

In August 2022, he was knocked out by Samuel Sevian in the first round of the second Lichess qualifier for the FIDE World Fischer Random Chess Championship 2022.
