= Hjörvar Steinn Grétarsson =

Icelandic chess grandmaster (born 1993)

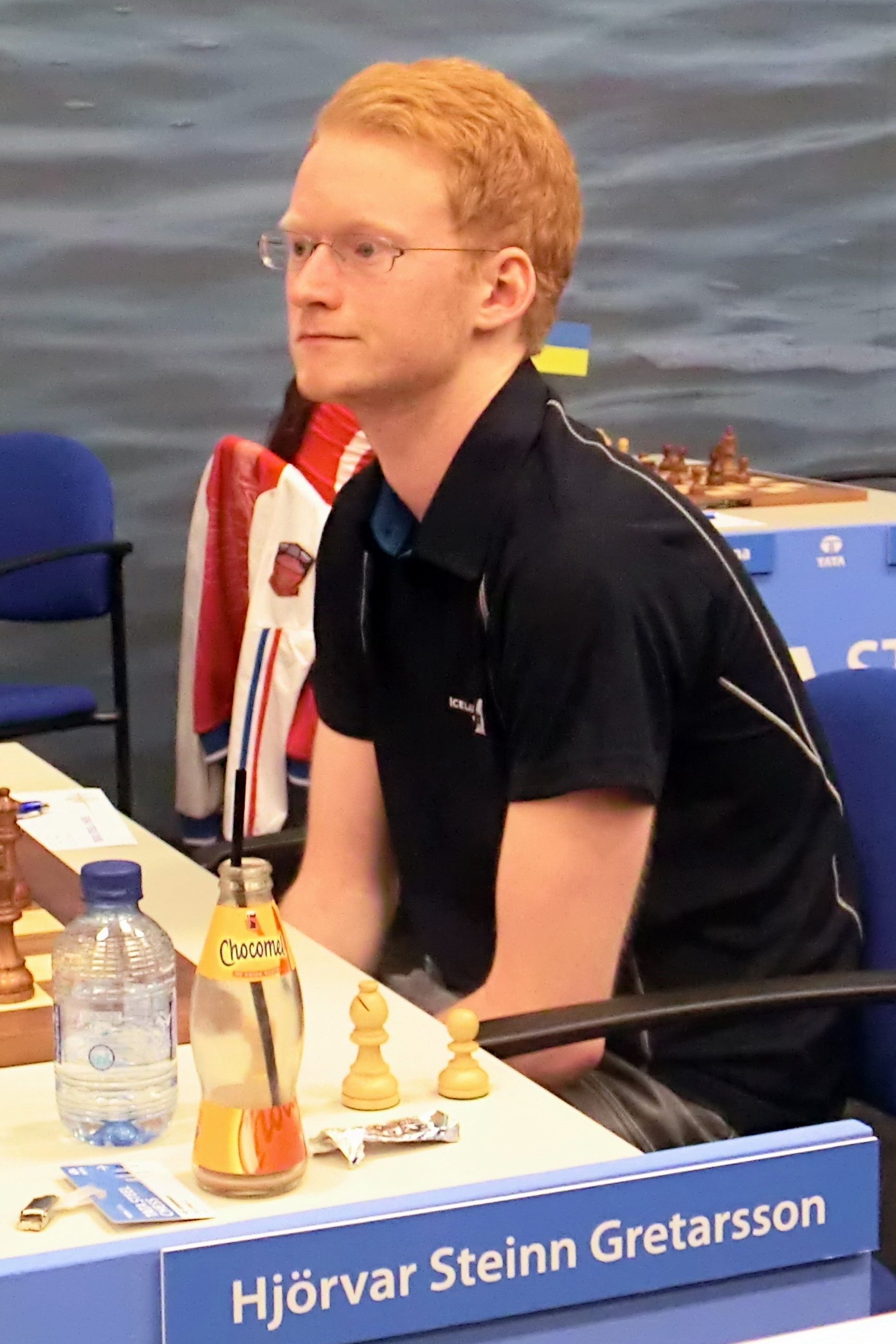
- Hjörvar Steinn Grétarsson, Wijk aan Zee 2013

Personal information
- Born: 29 May 1993 (age 33) Reykjavík, Iceland

Chess career
- Country: Iceland
- Title: Grandmaster (2013)
- FIDE rating: 2494 (July 2026)
- Peak rating: 2603 (June 2021)

Hjörvar Steinn Grétarsson (born 29 May 1993) is an Icelandic chess grandmaster. As of January 2025, he is the second best-ranked Icelandic player in the world.

== Chess career ==
Born in 1993, Hjörvar earned his FIDE master title in 2011, followed by his International master title in 2012, and Grandmaster title in 2013. He has represented Iceland at the Chess Olympiad six times - in 2010, 2012, 2014, 2016, 2018, and 2022.

Grétarsson received a wild card from the Icelandic Chess Federation to compete in the FIDE World Fischer Random Chess Championship 2022.
