= FIDE World Fischer Random Chess Championship 2019 =

2019 world championship of a variation of chess

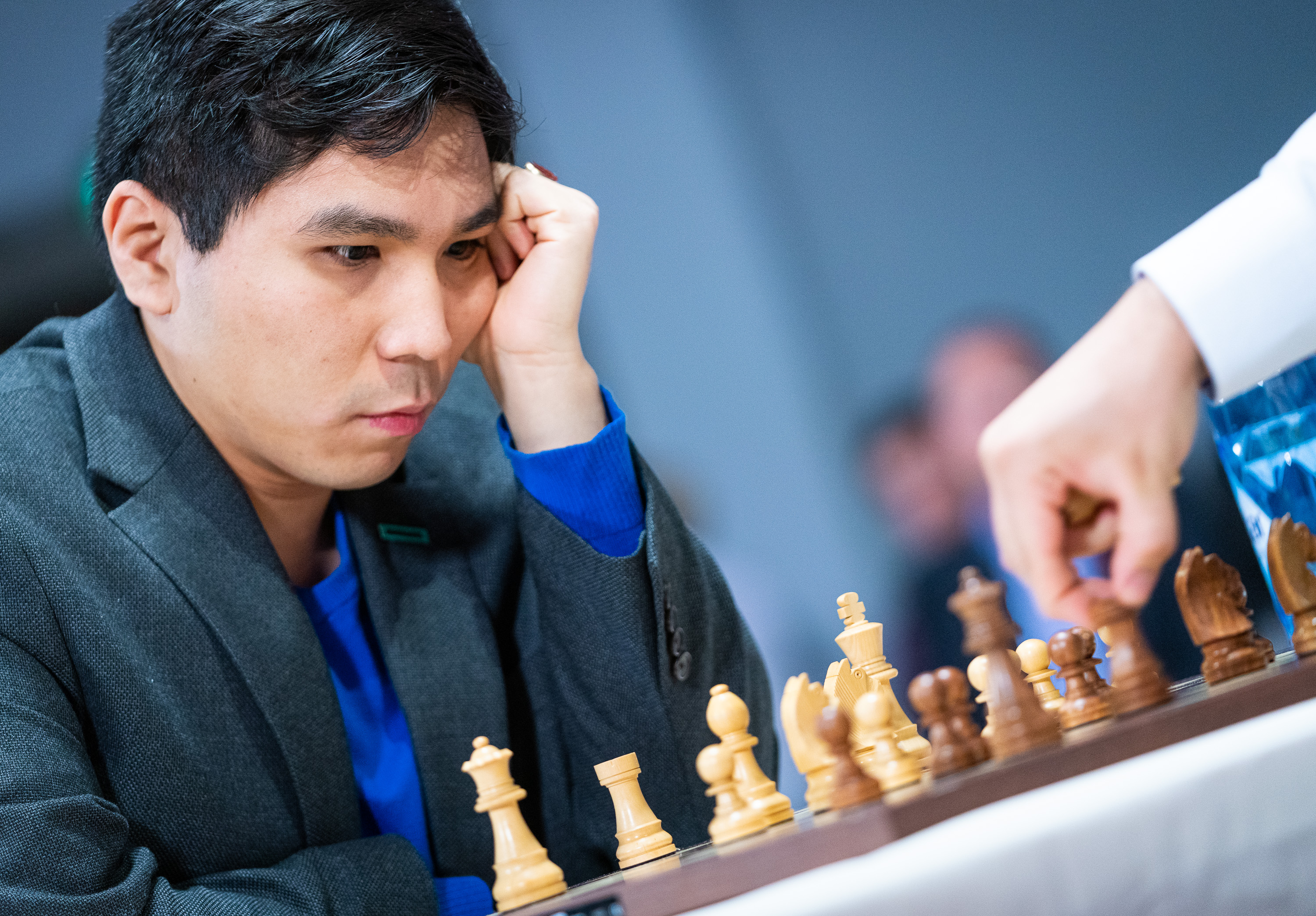
- Wesley So, the winner of the FIDE World Fischer Random Chess Championship 2019.
- Venue: Qualifiers & quarterfinals Internet chess server Semifinals & finals Henie Onstad Kunstsenter
- Location: Chess.com (qualifiers, quarterfinals); Bærum, Norway (semifinals & finals)
- Dates: 28 April – 2 November 2019
- Winning score: 13.5 points of 24
- Website: www.frchess.com

Champion
- (United States) Wesley So

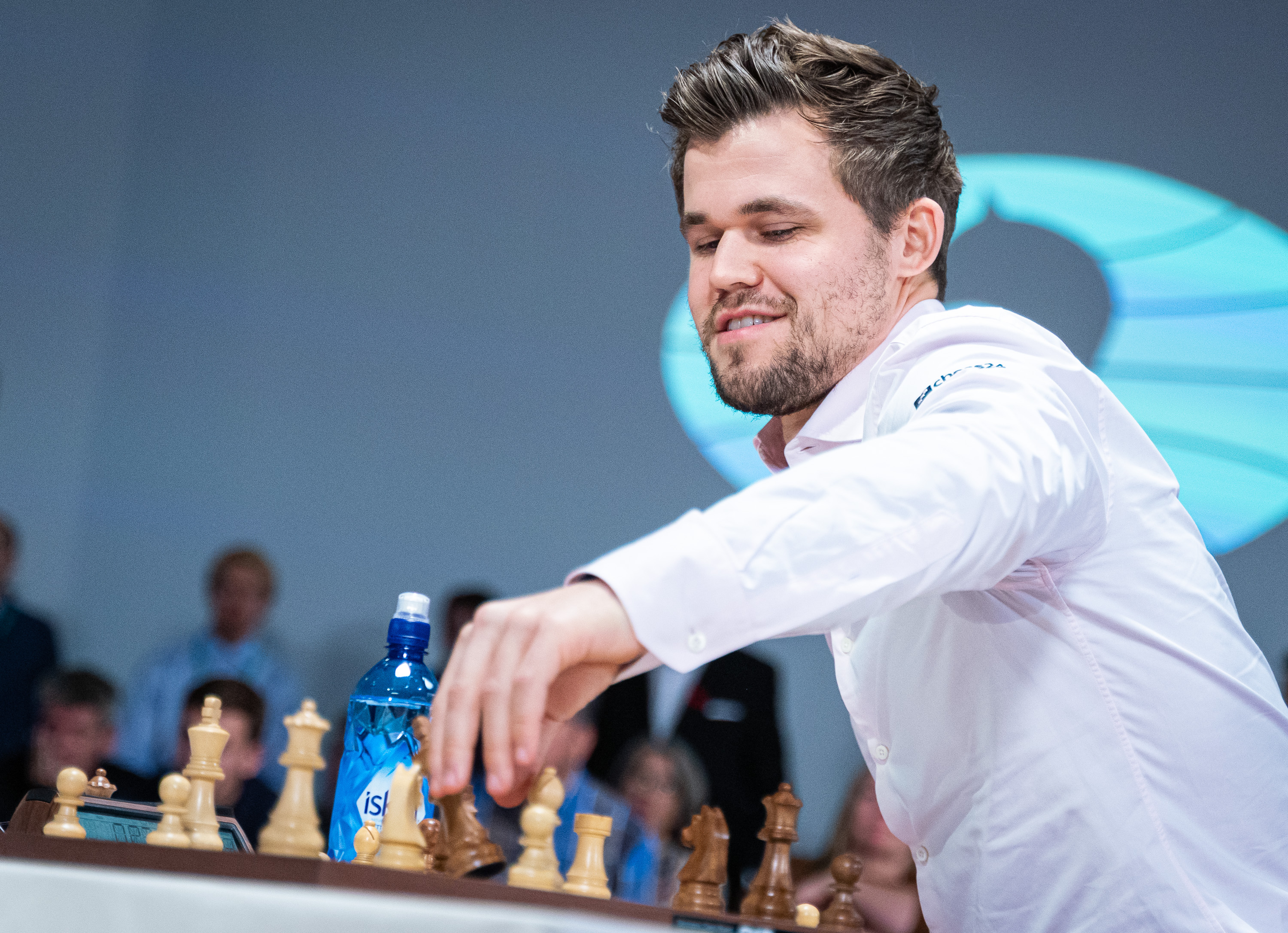
Magnus Carlsen finished in second place. Credit: Lennart Ootes

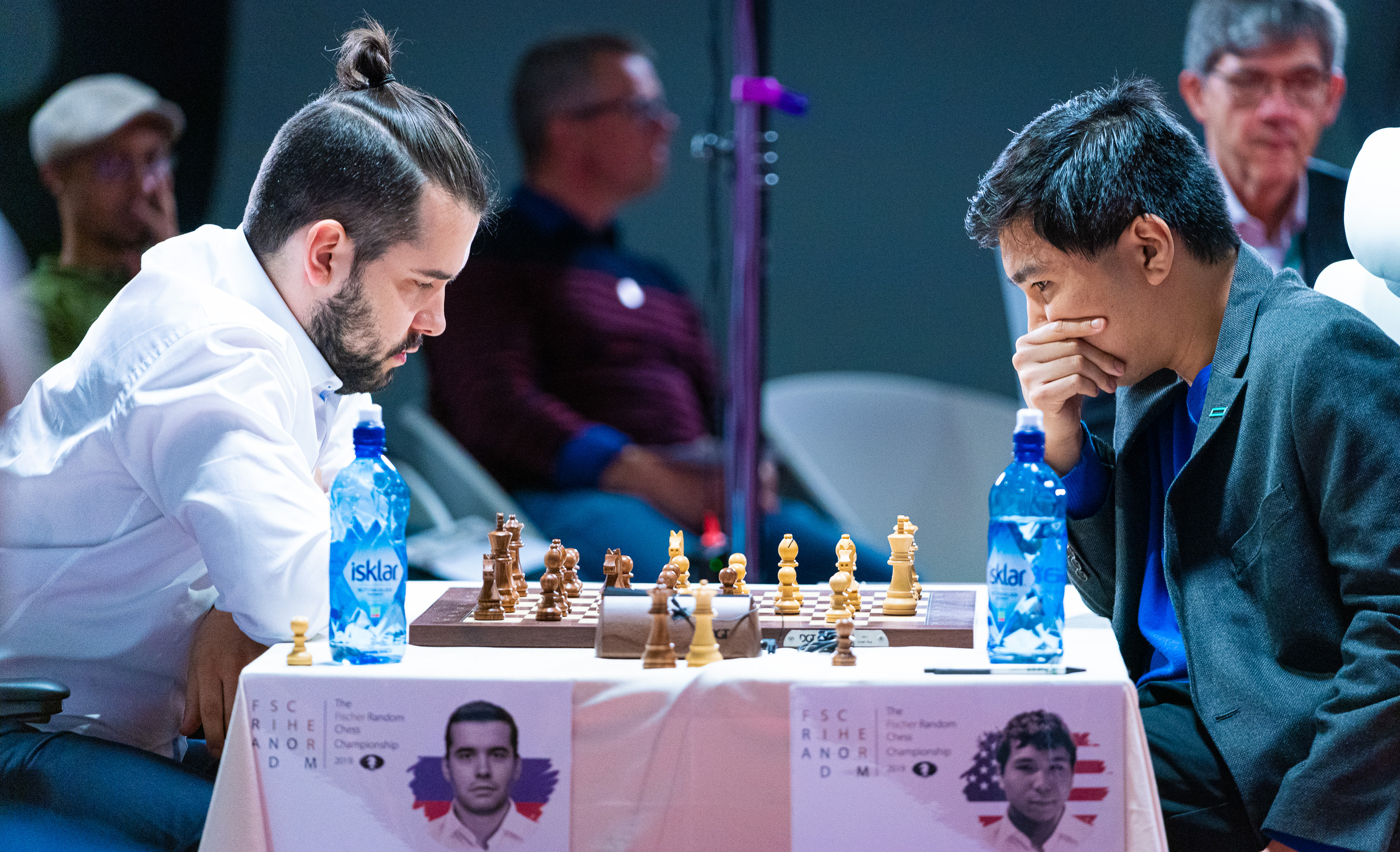
Ian Nepomniachtchi playing against Wesley So. Credit: Lennart Ootes

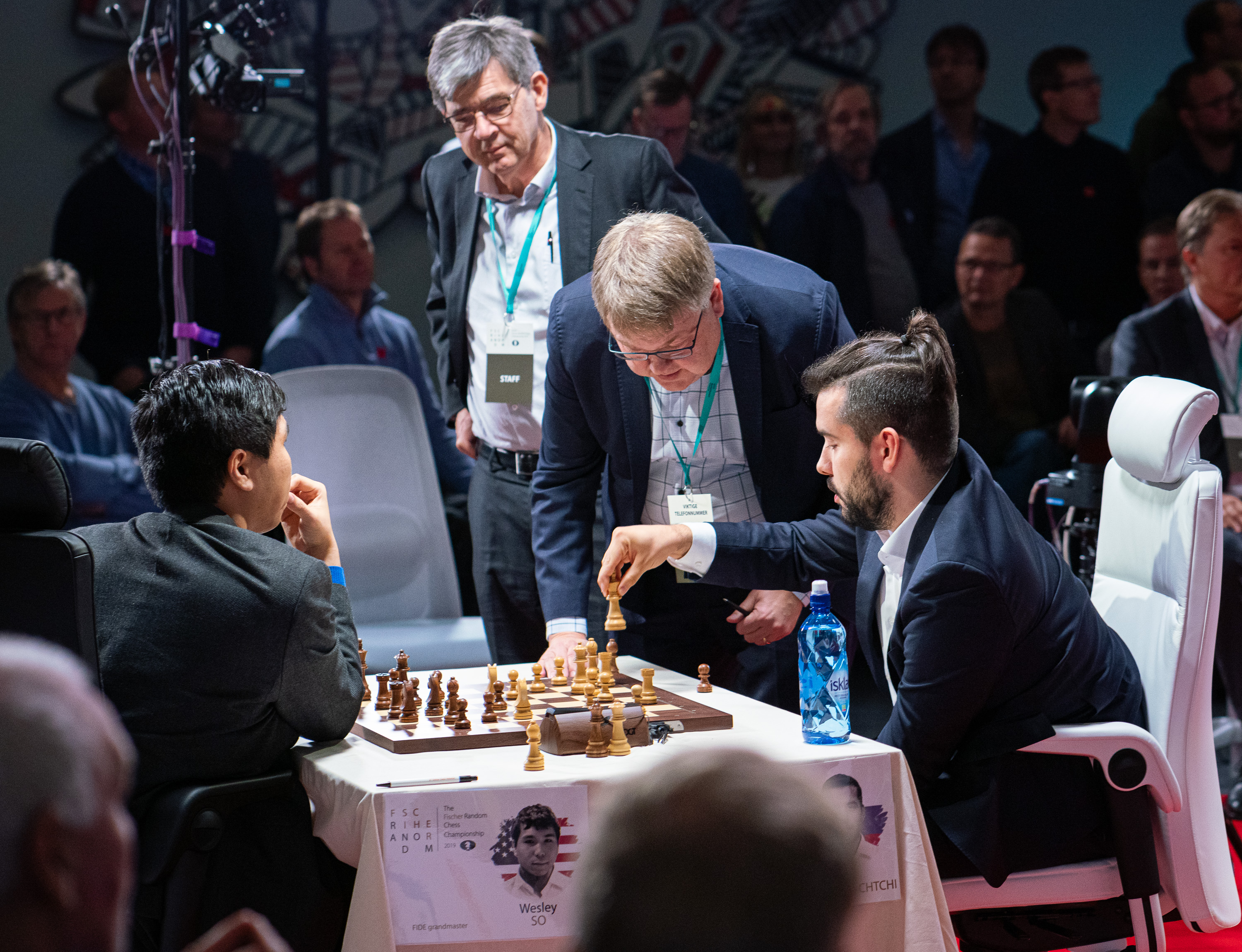
Ian Nepomniachtchi, while castling, lifted the rook before the king, which is not allowed. Credit: Lennart Ootes

The FIDE World Fischer Random Chess Championship 2019 (WFRCC) was the first world championship in Fischer random chess officially recognized by the international chess federation FIDE. Previous unofficial championships had been held, with the most recent winner being Magnus Carlsen in 2018. The competition started on April 28, 2019, with the first qualifying tournaments, which took place online and were open to all interested participants; and continued with further rounds up to the quarter-finals, which were also online. The semi-finals and final were played over the board between October 27 to November 2, 2019, in the Henie Onstad Kunstsenter in Bærum, Norway. The winner of the final was Wesley So, defeating Magnus Carlsen 13.5–2.5, to become the first FIDE world champion in Fischer random chess. Over the course of the competition, various time controls were applied, with longer games being weighted more heavily.

== Rounds ==
The championship included several rounds with different time controls, organizational forms and access requirements.

=== First qualifying round ===
The first qualifying round was open to all interested chess players without a title and was played online via the chess server Chess.com. Each of the 32 groups played a Swiss-system tournament with 9 rounds and a time control of 10 minutes for the entire game plus an increment of 2 seconds per move. The top 5 players from each group qualified for the second qualifying round, for a total of 160 players.

=== Second qualifying round ===
The second qualifying round was open to the 160 qualifiers from the first qualifying round as well as all FIDE title holders. Each of 12 groups played a Swiss-system tournament with 9 rounds, also with a time control of 10 minutes plus 2 seconds increment. The top 7 players from each group qualified for the third qualifying round, for a total of 84 players.

=== Third qualifying round ===
The 84 qualifiers from the second qualifying round were divided into 6 groups of 14 players each. Each group was supplemented by two invited chess players. Each group of 16 players played a single-elimination tournament. In each round of the tournament, the two players played a "minimatch" consisting of two games with opposite color assignments. In case of a tie, another minimatch with shorter time control was played, and another one with even shorter time control if the tie persisted. If there was still no decisive result after the third minimatch, the pairing was decided by an Armageddon game.

While the first two qualifying rounds brought a number of surprises, the winners of the third qualifying round were all near the top of the FIDE world rankings in standard chess. Nevertheless, some prominent players were knocked out, including Jan-Krzysztof Duda, Sergey Karjakin, Alexander Grischuk and Leinier Domínguez. The following 6 players qualified for the quarterfinals:

Name	Federation	FIDE rating
Ian Nepomniachtchi	Russia	2775
Alireza Firouzja	Iran	2685
Vidit Gujrathi	India	2703
Peter Svidler	Russia	2737
Vladimir Fedoseev	Russia	2681
Wesley So	United States	2763

Two more players were seeded directly into the quarterfinals: The runner-up in the World Chess Championship 2018 in standard chess, Fabiano Caruana, and the runner-up in the unofficial Fischer Random world championship match 2018, Hikaru Nakamura.

=== Quarterfinals ===
The quarterfinals were played online from October 4 to 6 2019. They can be viewed on Chess.com.

The first day saw matches between pairs of players. On the second day, the four losers played each other in pairs in a sort of repechage. On the third day, the winners of the first two days played each other in pairs. The three winners qualified for the semifinals: Caruana, Wesley So, and Ian Nepomniachtchi.

Each match of the quarterfinals consisted of two "slow" rapid games (45 minutes for 40 moves plus 15 minutes for the rest, without increment), two "fast" rapid games (15 minutes plus 2 seconds increment), and 2 blitz games (3 minutes plus 2 seconds increment). The games were weighted differently: 3 points for each slow rapid game, 2 points for each fast rapid game, and 1 point for each blitz game. This way, a player who lost all the slow rapid games of a match could catch up by and only by winning all the remaining (fast rapid & blitz) games to decide the match by Armageddon.

==== Day 1 ====
(Russia) Peter Svidler	5	7	(United States) Fabiano Caruana
(United States) Wesley So	3	9	(United States) Hikaru Nakamura
(Russia) Vladimir Fedoseev	8	4	(India) Vidit Gujrathi
(Iran) Alireza Firouzja	6	7	(Russia) Ian Nepomniachtchi

- On drawn portions: The only match whose slow rapid portion was not drawn was the match between Caruana and Svidler. Nakamura and Fedoseev won the fast rapid portions of their matches.
- On extra games: Both the matches between So and Nakamura and between Fedoseev and Gujrathi were already decided after the fourth game with 3:7 points in favour of, respectively, Nakamura and Fedoseev. Nevertheless, the four players decided to play the remaining two games, even though they were no longer relevant for the qualification for the semifinals.

==== Day 2 (repechage) ====
(India) Vidit Gujrathi	4½	7½	(Iran) Alireza Firouzja
(United States) Wesley So	6½	5½	(Russia) Peter Svidler

- On drawn portions: Both of the slow rapid portions were drawn. Firouzja won the fast rapid portion of his match.
- On extra games: The match between Gujrathi and Firouzja was also already decided after the fifth game with 6½:4½ points in favour of Firouzja. Nevertheless, the two players decided to play the remaining one game, even though it was no longer relevant for the qualification for the semifinals.

==== Day 3 ====
(Russia) Vladimir Fedoseev	5	7	(United States) Wesley So
(United States) Hikaru Nakamura	1½	6½	(United States) Fabiano Caruana
(Russia) Ian Nepomniachtchi	6½	3½	(Iran) Alireza Firouzja

- On drawn portions: None of the slow rapid portions were drawn.
- On extra games: The matches between Caruana and Nakamura and between Nepomniachtchi and Firouzja ended when a player won by reaching 6½ points. The match between So and Fedoseev was also already decided after the third game with 6½:1½ points in favour of So. Nevertheless, the two players decided to play the remaining three games, even though they were no longer relevant for the qualification for the semifinals.

=== Semifinals and finals ===
The semifinals and the finals took place from October 27 to November 2. In the semifinals, the three qualifiers from the quarterfinals were joined by the world champion in standard chess and the unofficial world champion in Chess960, Magnus Carlsen. The schedule was as follows:

Date	Event	Format
October 27	semifinals, games 1 and 2	45 min for 40 moves + 15 min for the rest, 3 points for a win
October 28	semifinals, games 3 and 4	45 min for 40 moves + 15 min for the rest, 3 points for a win
October 29	semifinals, games 5 to 8	15 min + 2 s increment, 2 points for a win
October 29	semifinals, games 9 to 12	3 min + 2 s increment, 1 point for a win
October 29	semifinals, tiebreak (armageddon, if needed)	5 min for white, 4 min for black, white has to win, black wins by drawing or winning
October 30	rest day	
October 31	finals / match for third place, games 1 and 2	45 min for 40 moves + 15 min for the rest, 3 points for a win
November 1	finals / match for third place, games 3 and 4	45 min for 40 moves + 15 min for the rest, 3 points for a win
November 2	finals / match for third place, games 5 to 8	15 min + 2 s increment, 2 points for a win
November 2	finals / match for third place, games 9 to 12	3 min + 2 s increment, 1 point for a win
November 2	finals / match for third place, tiebreak (if needed)	5 min for white, 4 min for black, white has to win

Unlike the quarterfinals, none of the matches were tied in the slow rapid portions. But as with the quarterfinals, every match in the semifinals & finals was won by the winner of the slow rapid portion.

==== Semifinals ====
Player	1	2	3	4	5	6	7	8	9	10	11	12	TB	Total
Player	Slow rapid				Fast rapid				Blitz				Armageddon	Total
Player	3 points per game				2 points per game				1 point per game				1 point per game	Total
(Norway) Magnus Carlsen	0	3	3	1½	1	2	0	2	Not required					12½
(United States) Fabiano Caruana	3	0	0	1½	1	0	2	0	Not required					7½
(Russia) Ian Nepomniachtchi	1½	1½	0	0	1	0	1	Not required						5
(United States) Wesley So	1½	1½	3	3	1	2	1	Not required						13
Starting position	744	744	357	357	67	67	642	642						

So won the semifinal match against Nepomniachtchi by reaching a score of 13–5 in the third fast rapid game. Carlsen won the semifinal match against Caruana by reaching a score of 12½-7½ in the last fast rapid game. Thus, So and Carlsen qualified for the final, while Nepomniachtchi and Caruana played for third place.

==== Finals and third-place match ====
The bracket below shows the first-place match between Carlsen and So as well as the third-place match between Nepomniachtchi and Caruana. The matches took place concurrently.

Player	1	2	3	4	5	6	7	8	9	10	11	12	TB	Total
Player	Slow rapid				Fast rapid				Blitz				Armageddon	Total
Player	3 points per game				2 points per game				1 point per game				1 point per game	Total
(Norway) Magnus Carlsen	1½	0	0	0	1	0	Not required							2½
(United States) Wesley So	1½	3	3	3	1	2	Not required							13½
(Russia) Ian Nepomniachtchi	0	3	3	1½	2	1	2	Not required						12½
(United States) Fabiano Caruana	3	0	0	1½	0	1	0	Not required						5½
Starting position	294	294	729	729	253	253	381							

So won the championship, defeating Carlsen 13½-2½. Leonard Barden observed that the score unadjusted for time controls would be 5-1 and compared this "crushing" defeat to Bobby Fischer's double 6-0 victories in the 1971 Candidates. Barden also reported that Carlsen was "deeply ashamed".

Nepomniachtchi beat Caruana 12½-5½ to take third place. Thus, Nepomniachtchi actually scored higher than Carlsen both in the slow rapid (10.5/24 vs 9/24) and in the fast rapid portions (7/12 vs 6/12) and thus overall (17.5/36 vs 15/36).
