= ICCF England =

The ICCF England belongs to the ICCF national member federations.

== Creation of EFCC ==
1962 saw the formation of the British Postal Chess Federation (BPCF). The name was changed to the British Federation of Correspondence Chess (BFCC) in 1999, and then again to English Federation for Correspondence Chess (2015).

== Principal Achievements ==
Great Britain won the gold medal in Olympiad IX and thereafter the same followed up to gain the silver medal in Olympiad X representing England.

== Grandmaster ==
- Anthony Barnsley
- John G. Brookes
- Dr. Ian S. Brooks
- Peter Hugh Clarke
- Peter Coleman
- Richard V. M. Hall
- Adrian Swayne Hollis
- Maurice W. Johnson
- Peter Richard Markland
- Dr. Peter J. R. Millican
- Jonathan Penrose
- Nigel Edward Povah
- Michael Prizant
- John Pugh
- Keith Richardson
- Nigel Robson
- Simon Webb

== Senior International Master ==
- John Anderson
- Dr. Jerry E. C. Asquith
- Ken J. Bowyer
- John Joseph Carleton
- Clifford R. Chandler
- Mike J. Conroy
- Gordon H. Davies
- John Kenneth Footner
- Clive A. Frostick
- Keith Kitson
- Ajoy K. Mukherjee
- Ian M. Pheby
- Michael John Read
- Charles Rich
- Ian L. Snape
- Jonathan A. Tait
- Trevor Thomas
- Paul F. Timson
- Giuseppe Valerio
- Dr. Kevern J. Verney
- John Vivante-Sowter

== International Master ==
- John F. Adams
- David William Anderton
- Frank Boyd
- Michael Edward Beech Brigden
- Henry W. Brockbank
- Duncan Chambers
- Julian Corfield
- Dr. Mike J. Donnelly
- David Ebbett
- Fred J. L. Fraser
- Kenneth B. Harman
- Michael Howard Horton
- W. F. (Bill) Lumley
- Liam Lynn
- Russell M. Pegg
- John D. Rhodes
- Sidney S. Shaw
- Chris C. W. Shephard
- Dr. Peter W. H. Smith
- Edward C. Sowden
- Peter John Sowray
- Alan Munro Stewart
- Janos I. Suto
- Ian D. Thompson
- John A. Toothill
- Christopher C. Williams
- Mike W. Wills

== Ladies Grandmaster ==
- Dr. Jill Barber
- Toni Halliwell
- Mrs. Mary E. Jones
- Dawn Williamson

== International Ladies Master ==
- Mrs. M. E. E. (Peggy) Clarke
