= International Correspondence Chess Grandmaster =

Correspondence chess title

International Correspondence Chess Grandmaster is a correspondence chess title created by FIDE in 1953, second only to that of world correspondence champion. Currently, this title is awarded by the International Correspondence Chess Federation (ICCF).

== Argentina ==
- Roberto Alvarez, GM 1998
- David Beaumont, GM 2007
- German Benz, GM 2002
- Ruben Berdichesky, GM 199
- Jose Copie, GM 2000
- Gustavo Echeguren, GM 2003
- Liliana Susana Fredes de Locio, LGM 2010
- Roberto Jacquin, GM 2009
- Juan Sebastian Morgado, GM 1983
- Alfredo Mozzino, GM 2000
- Carlos Pappier, GM 1995
- Norberto Patrici, GM 1998
- Rodolfo Redolfi, GM 1994
- Alfredo Roca, GM 1999
- Hector Walsh, GM 2006

== Australia ==
- Former world champion Cecil John Seddon Purdy, GM 1959
- Romanas Arlauskas, GM 1965
- Lucius Endzelins, GM 1959
- Chris Fenwick, GM 2007

== Austria ==
- Tunç Hamarat, GM 1997
- Hermann Knoll, GM 2009
- Christian Muck, GM 2012
- Friedrich Rattinger, GM 2009
- Gertrude Schoisswohl, LGM 1997
- Dr. Harald Tarnowiecki, GM 1998
- Dr. Sven Teichmeister, GM 2002
- Wolfgang Zugrav, GM 2003

== Belarus ==
- Dmitry Lybin, GM 2003

== Belgium ==
- Jozef Boey, GM 1975
- Marc Geenen, GM 2000
- Valeer Maes, GM 1988
- Former world champion Alberic O'Kelly de Galway, GM 1962
- Christophe Pauwels, GM 2009
- Richard Polaczek, GM 1995

== Bosnia and Herzegovina ==
- Jovan Kondali, GM 1986

== Brazil ==
- Luis Almiron, GM 2010
- Sergio Badolati, GM 2010
- Reginaldo de Castro Cerqueira Filho, GM 2010
- Paulo Chacon, GM 2009
- Antonio Cipoli, GM 2009
- Carlos Costa, GM 2002
- Salvador Cresce, GM 2003
- Jose Goncalves, GM 2003
- Nevio Joao, GM 2005
- Rafael Leitão, GM 2012
- Joao de Oliveira, GM 2009
- Marcio de Oliveira, GM 2005
- Iluska Pereira da Cunha Simonsen, LGM 2000

== Bulgaria ==
- Margarita Bocheva, LGM 2008
- Mladen Gudyev, GM 1991
- Valentin Iotov, GM 2012
- Sabina Karapchanska, LGM 2010
- Nikolai Ninov, GM 2000
- Georgi Popov, GM 1976

== Canada ==
- Jonathan Berry, GM 1985
- Jean Hébert, GM 1984
- Robert Kiviaho, GM 1984
- Wolfram Schoen, GM 2006
- Duncan Suttles, GM 1982
- Alexander Ugge, GM 2005

== Chile ==
- Guillermo Toro Solís, GM 1999

== Croatia ==
- Pavao Keglević, GM 1978
- Davor Krivić, GM 2008
- Maja Zelčić, LGM 2005
- Leonardo Ljubičić, GM 2011

== Cuba ==
- María de los Angeles Ynchauspi Leyva, LGM 2008

== Czech Republic ==
- Marie Bazantova, LGM 2004
- Petr Boukal, GM 2017
- Libor Danek, GM 1999
- Jiri Dufek, GM 2012
- Roman Chytilek, GM 2004
- Vlasta Horackova, LGM 2005
- Karel Husak, GM 1968
- Jaroslav Hybl, GM 1968
- Jaroslav Ježek, GM 1985
- Milos Kratochvil, GM 2006
- Leonardo Ljubicic, GM 2011
- Jan Lounek, GM 2014
- Jiri Moucka, GM 2014
- Eva Mozna, LGM 1997
- Zdeněk Nývlt, GM 2006
- Ludvik Pospisil, GM 2014
- Anna Ryvova, LGM 2003
- Rudolf Sevecek, GM 2000
- Alena Sikorova-Klosova, LGM 1997
- Kamil Stalmach, GM 2014
- Zdenek Straka, GM 2011
- Pavel Svacek, GM 2013
- Josef Sýkora, GM 2025
- Michal Tochacek, GM 2004
- Jaroslav Vaindl, GM 2004
- Jiri Vosahlik, GM 2009
- Davis Vrkoc, GM 2009
- Jindrich Zapletal, GM 1998
- Jan Židů, GM 2011

== Denmark ==
- Erik Bang, GM 1979
- Ove Ekebjaerg, GM GM 1987
- Niels Fries Nielsen, GM 1997
- Curt Hansen, GM 1999
- Jan du Jardin, GM 1999
- Allan Jensen, GM 1990
- Arne Jorgensen, GM 2002
- Martin Lohse, GM 2009
- Jens Nielsen, GM 2005
- Allan Poulsen, GM 2000
- Jørn Sloth, GM 1978
- Bent Sorensen, GM 1994

== England ==
- Jill Barber, LGM 2005
- Anthony Barnsley, GM 2009
- John Brookes, GM 2001
- Ian Brooks, GM 2002
- Peter H Clarke, GM 1980
- Peter Coleman, GM 2004
- Richard Hall, GM 2002
- Adrian Hollis, GM 1976
- Maurice W. Johnson, GM 1995
- Mary E. Jones, LGM 2005
- Peter Markland, GM 1984
- Peter Millican, GM 1996
- Jonathan Penrose, GM 1983
- Nigel Povah, GM 1989
- Michael Prizant, GM 1996
- John Pugh, GM 2006
- Keith Richardson, GM 1975
- Nigel Robson, GM 2011
- Simon Webb, GM 1983

== Estonia ==
- Alvar Kangur, GM 2007
- Raul Kukk, GM 2006
- Tõnu Õim, GM 1981
- Merike Rõtova, LGM 1997
- Jüri Siigur, GM 2011
- Tonu Tiits, GM 2009
- Svetlana Zainetdinova, LGM 2009

== Finland ==
- Reijo Hiltunen, GM 1999
- Risto Kauranen, GM 1977
- Jaako Kivimäki, GM 1998
- Tero Kokkila, GM 1996
- Olli Koskinen, GM 1982
- Auvo Kujala, GM 1991
- Pertti Lehikoinen, GM 1985
- Asko Linna, GM 2006
- Georg Österman, GM 1994
- Pentti Palmo, GM 1980
- Heikki Pigg, GM 2007
- Auno Siikaluoma, GM 2012
- Kari Tikkanen, GM 1999
- Juhani Sorri, GM 1982

== France ==
- Volf Bergraser, GM 1981
- Stephane Goerlinger, GM 2005
- Michel Lecroq, GM 1998
- Christophe Leotard, GM 2000
- Manuel Menetrier, GM 2002
- Jacqueline Roos, LGM 2000
- David Roubaud, GM 2014
- Robert Serradimigni, GM 2009
- Christophe Spitz, GM 2007

== Germany ==
- Friedrich Baumbach, GM 1973
- Volker-Michael Anton, GM 1987
- Andreas Bachmann, GM 2001
- Robert Bauer, GM 2014
- Gerd Branding, GM 2004
- Andreas Brenke, GM 2004
- Wolfgang Brodda, GM 2009
- Horst Broß, GM 2005
- Jürgen Bücker, GM 2009
- Heinrich Burger, GM 1996
- Annemarie Burghoff, LGM 2005
- Detlef Buse, GM 2019
- Stephan Busemann, GM 1996
- Heinz-Wilhelm Dünhaupt, GM 1973
- Hans-Marcus Elwert, GM 1996
- Klaus Engel, GM 1983
- Ingo Firnhaber, GM 2010
- Wolfgang Fischer, GM 2011
- Ricarda Flügel, LGM 2008
- Helmut Geist, GM 2010
- Frank Gerhardt, GM 2003
- Matthias Gleichmann, GM 2016
- Hans-Ulrich Grünberg, GM 1991
- Wolfgang Häßler, GM 1997
- Tobias Habermehl, GM 2020
- Horst Handel, GM 1987
- Laura Hartmann, LGM 2009
- Hermann Heemsoth, GM 1987
- Paul Heilemann, GM 1984
- Knut Herschel, GM 1999
- Peter Hertel, GM 1999
- Olaf Hesse, GM 2025
- Hans-Joachim Hofstetter, GM 2003
- Siegfried Karkuth, GM 2006
- Heinz-Erich van Kempen, GM 1999
- Klaus Keuter, GM 2013
- Siegfried Kluve, GM 1998
- Klaus Kögler, GM 2007
- Martin Kreuzer, GM 1994
- Matthias Kribben, GM 2009
- Günther Kühnel, GM 2009
- Fred Kunzelmann, GM 2007
- Gerhard Löh, GM 1991
- Karl-Heinz Maeder, GM 1992
- Ralph Mallee, GM 1989
- Werner Metz, GM 1997
- Dieter Mohrlok, GM 1999
- Reinhard Moll, GM 2009
- Gerhard Müller, GM 2006
- Joachim Neumann, GM 2001
- Arno Nickel, GM 2001
- Manfred Nimtz, GM 1998
- Thomas Raupp, GM 2001
- Dieter Reppmann, GM 2005
- Horst Rittner, GM 1961
- Wolfgang Rohde, GM 2006
- Michael Rümmele, GM 2012
- Adrian Schilcher, GM 2021
- Lothar Schmid, GM 1959
- Anja Schmidt, LGM 2005
- Frank Schröder, GM 2008
- Ingo Schütt, GM 1999
- Sandra Seidel, LGM 2010
- Christian Sender, GM 2002
- Mirna Siewert, LGM 2004
- Achim Soltau, GM 1993
- Claus Sprengelmeier, GM 2006
- René-Reiner Starke, GM 2012
- Ulrich Stephan, GM 2010
- Dieter Stern, GM 1985
- Werner Stern, GM 2009
- Günter Stertenbrink, GM 1984
- Hans Tauber, GM 2021
- Mikhail Semenovich Tseitlin, GM 1990
- Maximilian Voss, GM 2003
- Robert K. Frhr. von Weizsäcker, GM 2004
- Thomas Winckelmann, GM 2004
- Georg Windhausen, GM 2019
- Hans-Dieter Wunderlich, GM 2006
- Hubert Zautzig, GM 2010
- Hans Ziewitz, GM 1995

== Guatemala ==
- César Augusto Blanco Gramajo, GM 2003

== Hungary ==
- Gabor Glatt, GM 2002
- María Nemeth, LGM 2005
- Tamás Sasvarí, GM 2007

== India ==
- Dhanish P. B., GM 2014

== Israel ==
- Dmitry Gooshchin, GM 2011

== Italy ==
- Gabriel Cardelli, GM 2002
- Claudio Casabona, GM 2000
- Ettore D'Adamo, GM 2002
- Massimo De Blasio, GM 2001
- Fabio Finocchiaro, GM 1999
- Sante Giuliani, GM 2005
- Mario Napolitano, GM 1959
- Angelo Peluso, GM 1998
- Laura Piazza, LGM 2008
- Vittorio Piccardo, GM 2001
- Eros Riccio, GM 2010
- Alessandra Riegler, LGM 2005
- Luz Marina Tinjaca, LGM 2006
- Maurizio Tirabassi, GM 1999
- Bela Toth, GM 2004
- Elio Vassia, GM 2005
- Alberto Zanetti, GM 1997

== Japan ==
- Sakae Ohtake, GM 2007
- Klyotaka Sakai, GM 2006

== Kazakhstan ==
- Farit Gasisovich Balabaev, GM 2003

== Latvia ==
- Maigonis Avotiņš, GM 2015
- Artis Gaujēns, GM 2004
- Aivars Gipslis, GM 1995
- Jānis Klovāns, GM 2001
- Ingrīda Priedīte, LGM 1998
- Olita Rause, LGM 1994 and GM 1998
- Vilnis Strautiņš, GM 2009
- Janis Vitomskis, GM 2001

== Lithuania ==
- Vytautas Andriulaitis, GM 2001
- Vilma Dambrauskaite, LGM 2005
- Virginijus Dambrauskas, GM 2018
- Virginijus Grabliauskas, GM 2010
- Alfonsas Kupsys, GM 2011
- Donatas Lapienis, GM 1979
- Valentinas Normantas, GM 1995
- Giutautas Petraitis, GM 2010
- Pavel Rubinas, GM 2010
- Boris Rumiancevas, GM 1991
- Robertas Sutkus, GM 1998

== Luxembourg ==
- Norbert Stoll, GM 2003
- Jean-Marie Weber, GM 2004

== Mexico ==
- Jorge Aldrete Lobo, GM 2006
- Kenneth Frey, GM 2004

== Netherlands ==
- Peter Boll, GM 1993
- Hans Bouwmeester, GM 1981
- Dick van Geet, GM 1991
- Carol-Peter Gouw, GM 2003
- David van der Hoeven, GM 2004
- Abram Idema, GM 1994
- Haije Kramer, GM 1984
- Jacques Kuiper, GM 2007
- Ron Langeveld, GM 2006
- Rudolf Maliangkay, GM 1994
- Karl Mulder van Leens Dijkstra, GM 1977
- Joop Oosterom, GM 1992
- Gerardus van Perlo, GM 1985
- Michail Plomp, GM 2000
- Hendrick Sarink, GM 1979
- Piet Seewald, GM 1992
- Dick Smit, GM 1979
- Gert Timmerman, GM 1986
- Hans van Unen, GM 2007
- Tjalling Wiersma, GM 1985

== New Zealand ==
- Mark Noble, GM 2010

== Norway ==
- Olaf Barda, GM 1953
- Ivar Bern, GM 1997
- Raymond Boyer, GM 2003
- Arild Haugen, GM 2006
- Morten Lilleoren, GM 2007
- Peter Stigar, GM 1995
- Arne Vinje, GM 2001
- Terje Wibe, GM 1993

== Peru ==
- Angel Acevedo Villalba, GM 2005

== Poland ==
- Stefan Brzózka, GM 1985
- Jerzy Krzyston, GM 1992
- Jan Marcinkiewicz, GM 2006
- Maciej Nizynski, GM 2000
- Jacek Oskulski, GM 2018
- Rafael Pierzak, GM 2013
- Zygmunt Pioch, GM 1991
- Ryszard Skrobek, GM 1990
- Bogdan Sliwa, GM 1995
- Zbigniew Szczepański, GM 2011

== Portugal ==
- Horacio Neto, GM 2007
- Alvaro Pereira, GM 1994
- Francisco Pessoa, GM 2015
- Luis Santos, GM 1994
- Antonio Silva, GM 2009
- Joaquim Pedro Soberano, GM 2005

== Qatar ==
- Mohamed Al-Thani, GM 1999

== Romania ==
- Gheorghe S. Rotariu, GM 1981
- Paul Diaconescu, GM 1982
- Mihai Breazu, GM 1985
- Mariana Plass-Caravan, LGM 2003
- Florin Șerban, GM 2010
- Costel Voiculescu, GM 2012

== Russia and Soviet Union ==
=== World Champions ===
- Yakov Estrin, GM 1966
- Vyacheslav Ragozin, GM 1959
- Grigory Sanakoev, GM 1984
- Mikhail Umansky, GM 1995
- Prof. Vladimir Zagorovsky, GM 1965
- Aleksandr Dronov, GM 2005

=== Other players ===
- Dmitry Barash, GM 1992
- Lyudmila S. Belavenets, LGM 1997
- Maksim Blokh, GM 1998
- Igor Bondarevsky, GM 1961
- Georgy Borisenko, GM 1966
- Piotr Dubinin, GM 1962
- Sergey Grodzensky, GM 1999
- Michail Judowitsch, GM 1972
- Abram Khasin, GM 1972
- Sergey Khlusevich, GM 1997
- Igor Kopylov, GM 1994
- Sergei Korolev, GM 1995
- Vsevolod Kosenkov, GM 1979
- Aleksei Mikhailov, GM 1983
- Oleg Moissev, GM 1977
- Igor Morozov, GM 1973
- Gennadi Nesis, GM 1985
- Lev Omeltschenko, GM 1986
- Irina V. Perevertkina, LGM 1999
- Nina G. Shchebenyuk, LGM 2006
- Olga M. Sukhareva, LGM 2006
- Aleksey Voll, GM 2007
- Lora G. Yakovleva, LGM 1997
- Tamara P. Zaitseva, LGM 2008

== Scotland ==
- Douglas Bryson, GM 1986
- David Kilgour, GM 1985
- Andrew Muir, GM 1994

== Serbia ==
- Matyas Berta, GM 1978
- Milan Jovcic, GM 1985
- Radovan Tomasevic, GM 1984
- Borislav Vukcevic, GM 1982

== Slovenia ==
- Aleš BorŠtnik, GM 2012
- Franček Brglez, GM 1979
- Iztok Brunšek, GM 2010
- Leon Gostiša, GM 1998
- Danilo Korže, GM 2012
- Marjan Šemrl, GM 2007
- Jernej Šivic, GM 2012
- Boris Žlender, GM 1997

== South Africa ==
- John Barlow, GM 2001

== Spain ==
- Manuel Bescós Anzano, GM 2012
- Miguel Cánovas Pordomingo, GM 2011
- Carlos Cruzado Duenas, GM 2009
- P Drake Diez de Rivera, GM 2007
- Alberto González Freixas, GM 2005
- David Lafarga Santorroman, GM 2008
- Angel Manso Gil, GM 2013
- Joel Martin Clemente, GM 2008
- Jose Mercadal Benejam, GM 2002
- Francisco Javier Muñoz Moreno, GM 2012
- Jesús Punzón Moraleda, GM 2024
- Carlos Rodríguez Amezqueta, GM 2014
- Francisco Vellila V. Velasco, GM 2008

== Sweden ==
- Goran Andersson, GM 1991
- Ulf Andersson, GM 1996
- Eric Arnlind, GM 1968
- Arne Bjuhr, GM 2013
- Ingvar Carlsson, GM 1997
- Björn Fagerström, GM 2011
- Jan-Olof Forsberg, GM 2007
- Jonny Hector, GM 1999
- Tony Hedlund, GM 2005
- Rone Holmberg, GM 2002
- Rolf Lekander, GM 1992
- Franko Lukel, GM 2002
- Åke Lundqvist, GM 1962
- Harald Malmgren, GM 1959
- Jan Ohlin, GM 1990
- Dan Olofsson, GM 2000
- Conny Persson, GM 2004
- Lennart Rydholm, GM 2003
- Stefan Winge, GM 2011

== Switzerland ==
- Phillippe Berclaz, GM 2004
- Ernst Eichhorn, GM 1990
- Gottardo Gottardi, GM 1995
- Christian Issler, GM 2004
- Rolf Knobel, GM 2003
- Matthias Rüfenacht, GM 1992
- Rolf Scherer, GM 2011
- Wolfgang Standke, GM 2012
- Josef Steiner, GM 1973
- Anton Thaler, GM 2004
- Bela Toth, GM 2004

== Turkey ==
- Murat Akaag, GM 2014
- Fatih Atakisi, GM 2010
- Tansel Turgut, GM 2007

== Ukraine ==
- Alex Bubir, GM 2009
- Sergei Bibir, GM 2012
- Vladimir Dudyev, GM 2008
- Alexandr Gozman, GM 2006
- Svetlana Ignatchenko, LGM 1997
- Aleksey Lepikhov, GM 2002
- Nikolai Papenin, GM 2011
- Leonid Rubinchik, GM 1998
- Oleg Savchak, GM 2000
- Ivan Terelya, GM 2017
- Alexandr Volchok, GM 1993
- Alexandr Voyna, GM 1998

== United States ==
- Hans Jack Berliner (deceased), GM 1968
- Vytas Victor Palciauskas, GM 1983
- Joseph DeMauro, GM 1997
- Alik Zilberberg, GM 1994
- John Timm, GM 2004
- Robin Smith (deceased), GM 2004
- Jason Bokar, GM 2007
- Daniel M. Fleetwood, GM 2008
- Edward Duliba, GM 2009
- Stephen Ham, GM 2010
- Jon Ostriker, GM 2010
- Tim Murray, GM 2017
- Carl Siefring, GM 2017
- Jon Edwards, GM 2022
- Dan Perry, GM 2024

== See also ==
- List of chess grandmasters
