= Roman Chytilek =

Czech chess player (born 1976)

Personal information
- Born: 24 February 1976 (age 50)

Chess career
- Country: Czech Republic
- Title: FIDE International Master (2001); ICCF Grandmaster (2004)
- FIDE rating: 2316 (November 2021)
- Peak rating: 2424 (October 2004)
- ICCF rating: 2684 (October 2021)
- ICCF peak rating: 2693 (April 2010)

Roman Chytilek (born 24 February 1976) is a Czech correspondence chess grandmaster, currently No.1 of International Correspondence Chess Federation (ICCF) rating list and winner of the 16th Olympiad (with the team Czech Republic).

== Personal life ==
Chytilek holds a Ph.D. in political science and currently works as an Associate Professor and a Vice-Dean of Social Studies on the Masaryk University in Brno, Czech Republic. His field of expertise consists of party systems, electoral systems, experimental political science and game theory. Chytilek also likes competitive debates. He opposed direct election of Czech President and won a debate against upcoming Czech President Miloš Zeman who supported the bill, in December 2011.

== Over the board chess ==
Chytilek has obtained his FIDE international master title in 2001. During his junior years, he took part in European Junior championship in Siofok, Hungary, with a 5.5/11 score. Nowadays, he seldom participates at individual tournaments, last notable performance has been 4-7th place at Leiden Open (Netherlands). Chytilek has also been active in Czech team league, playing 1996-1997 for Tatran Havřice, in 1999-2012 for ŠK Zlín and from 2012 for TŽ Třinec. He has won Slovak team league twice: in 2003/04 with (Slovakofarma Hlohovec) and 2009/10 (with ŠK Prievidza)

== Correspondence chess ==
International Master since 2000, Senior International Master since 2002, Grandmaster since 2004.

His best achievements include: winner of the Itzhak Veinger Invitational Tournament (2002–2006), 2nd in Simon Webb (2007–2009), František Batík (2003–2006) and Maximo Portela (2001–2006) Memorial Invitational Tournaments.

He has won Interzonal team tournament with team Europe 1 (2000–2003), picked up bronze with Czech Rep. in the European Team championship (1999–2004), behind Germany and Lithuania) and Silver in 12th Olympiad (2004–2009, behind Germany). Chytilek achieved his highest rating of 2693 in 2010, currently rated 2685 = 1st place on ICCF rankings (since January 2015). He has played 127 ICCF games since 1999, won 56, drew 67, lost 4 (overall performance 70,5%).

He also participated in several computer assisted tournaments. In 2006, he was invited by Jiri Dufek to the 4th PAL/CSS Freestyle Final Tournament, held on Playchess.com. Rather surprisingly, their team, Xakru, won the event, after finishing only 10th in the preliminary round.

Chytilek himself described his deeply analytical style as a combination of non-routine use of chess engines and regular aim at exploitation of the weaknesses of his opponents, leading to a non-trivial solutions in the critical situations - a view his fellow grandmasters at the ICCF have been often sharing about him.

== Heemsoth Memorial and 16th Olympiad ==
The Heemsoth Memorial was an invitational tournament organized by the German Correspondence chess federation, played in memory of German grandmaster Hermann Heemsoth, who died in 2006 at the age of 96. The event started on 20 January 2008 with 17 players. With an average rating of 2633, the tournament was the strongest invitational correspondence chess event of all times. Four former correspondence chess world champions- Vytas Palciauskas, Tunc Hamarat, Mikhail Umansky and Ivar Bern- took part, as well as Ron Langeveld, who has become world champion in 2012. Chytilek won the tournament on tiebreak over Langeveld and English grandmaster Richard Hall. With 10 points out of 16 games, he scored 4,5/5 against world champions. Chytilek also won the special prize for the best game of the tournament for his win against Langeveld. The dramatic course of the tournament was later described in the book "Fernschachdramen", written by the former CC World Champion, Fritz Baumbach and the tournament participant, German grandmaster Stephan Busemann. In 2010, Chytilek started to play for the Czech team in the Final of the 16th Correspondence Chess Olympiad (World Team chess championship), on Board 1. The Czechs (GM Chytilek, GM Jiri Dufek, GM David Vrkoc, GM Jiri Vosahlik, Teamcaptain: SIM Josef Mrkvicka) won the Gold medals convincingly, with a huge lead over Germany and France. Chytilek himself had the best result on Board 1.

== Future chess career ==
In the interview for the Novoborsky sachovy server (nss.cz) in January 2015, Chytilek admitted, he has been considering to suspend, or even end his correspondence career, because of the lack of proper tournaments available for the player of his class and decreasing motivation. He however declared himself always ready to play correspondence chess in charity events.
