= Virginijus Grabliauskas =

Lithuanian chess player (born 1972)

Personal information
- Born: 21 June 1972 (age 54) Vilnius, Lithuania

Chess career
- Country: Lithuania
- Title: International Master (1994); International Correspondence Chess Grandmaster (2010)
- Peak rating: 2470 (July 1998)

Virginijus Grabliauskas (born 21 June 1972) is a Lithuanian chess player who holds the titles of International Master (IM, 1994) and International Correspondence Chess Grandmaster (GM, 2010). He is winner of Lithuanian Chess Championship (1997).

== Biography ==
Virginijus Grabliauskas was a multiple participant of the Lithuanian Chess Championships, in which he won two medals: gold (1997) and bronze (1990). Virginijus Grabliauskas is five times winner of Lithuanian Team Chess Championships (1992, 1993, 1995, 1997, 2007).

Virginijus Grabliauskas played for Lithuania in the European Team Chess Championship:

- In 1997, at fourth board in the 11th European Team Chess Championship in Pula (+3, =4, -2).

Virginijus Grabliauskas also eight times played for Lithuanian chess clubs in European Chess Club Cups (1994-1996, 2005-2009). In 1994 he was awarded the FIDE International Master (IM) title.

Since 2000, Virginijus Grabliauskas has been active participated in correspondence chess tournaments. His main achievements are silver medal of the 6th European Team Correspondence Chess Championship with Lithuanian team (2004-2008). He won 2nd place at the 6th board in the 14th Correspondence Chess Olympiad (2002-2006). In 2010, he was awarded the ICCF International Correspondence Chess Grandmaster (GM) title.

Virginijus Grabliauskas is graduate of the Vilnius University Faculty of Communication. From 1994 to 2004 he worked as an analyst at company ZPR International Inc., from 2004 to 2007 as a financial analyst at company Investicijų portfelių valdymas. Since 2008 Virginijus Grabliauskas has been the director of the National Chess League. From 2002 to 2008, he was the responsible secretary of the Lithuanian Correspondence Chess Federation. From 2004, he was Lithuanian representative in the International Correspondence Chess Federation.
