= Eric Arnlind =

Swedish chess player (1922–1998)

Personal information
- Full name: Eric Alfons Arnlind
- Born: 14 March 1922 Luvia, Finland
- Died: 22 December 1998 (aged 76) Stockholm, Sweden

Chess career
- Country: Sweden
- Title: International Correspondence Chess Grandmaster (1968)
- ICCF rating: 2587 (July 1992)

Eric Alfons Arnlind (14 March 1922 – 22 December 1998) was a Swedish chess player. He was a Swedish Chess Championship medalist in 1961 and received the chess title of International Correspondence Chess Grandmaster in 1968.

== Biography ==
From 1957 to 1961, Arnlind five time participated in Swedish Chess Championship finals. His best result was silver medal in 1961. In this same year Eric Arnlind won Swedish Chess Team Championship with Stockholm team. In 1963, he participated in Stockholm International Chess Tournament.

He played for Sweden in the Chess Olympiad:

- In 1958, at first reserve board in the 13th Chess Olympiad in Munich (+4, =6, -2).

Arnlind played for Sweden in the European Team Chess Championship preliminaries:

- In 1961, at eight board in the 2nd European Team Chess Championship preliminaries (+3, =1, -0).

He achieved particular success in the correspondence chess. He participated in the 2nd World Correspondence Chess Championship (1956-1959) and ranked in 6th place. In the 8th World Correspondence Chess Championship (1975-1980), Eric Arnlind shared 6th-10th place. In 1959, he received the International Correspondence Master title but in 1968, he was awarded the International Correspondence Grandmaster title.

Arnlind worked as an engineer at the Swedish Road Research Bureau.
