= Arne Vinje =

Norwegian chess player (1943–2011)

Personal information
- Born: 27 March 1943
- Died: 21 August 2011 (aged 68)

Chess career
- Country: Norway
- Title: FIDE International Master (1981); ICCF Grandmaster (2001)
- FIDE rating: 2335 (July 1989)
- Peak rating: 2450 (January 1984)
- ICCF rating: 2562 (October 2004)
- ICCF peak rating: 2634 (July 1997)

Arne Vinje (27 March 1943 – 21 August 2011), also known as Arne Vinje-Gulbrandsen until 1986, was a Norwegian chess player and two-time Norwegian Chess Championship winner (1965, 1968). In over-the-board chess, he received the FIDE title of International Master (IM) in 1981. In correspondence chess, he earned the ICCF title of Grandmaster (GM) in 2001.

== Biography ==
From the early 1960s to the early 1980s, Vinje was one of Norway's leading chess players. In 1961, in The Hague he ranked 8th in 6th World Junior Chess Championship. In 1965, in Mosjøen Arne Vinje won his first Norwegian Chess Championship. In 1968, in Oslo he won his second Norwegian Chess Championship.

He played for Norway in the Chess Olympiads:

- In 1962, at fourth board in the 15th Chess Olympiad in Varna (+8, =4, -3),
- In 1964, at fourth board in the 16th Chess Olympiad in Tel Aviv (+7, =3, -5),
- In 1970, at third board in the 19th Chess Olympiad in Siegen (+4, =2, -2),
- In 1982, at third board in the 25th Chess Olympiad in Lucerne (+0, =2, -3).

Vinje played for Norway in the European Team Chess Championship preliminaries:

- In 1983, at third board in the 8th European Team Chess Championship preliminaries (+1, =1, -2).

He played for Norway in the Nordic Chess Cup:

- In 1971, at second board in the 2nd Nordic Chess Cup in Großenbrode (+1, =4, -0) and won team bronze medal.

In the 1990s, Vinje devoted himself to the correspondence chess, in which he achieved significant results, being one of the world's leaders in the 1990s. In 1963, he shared 1st place in Nordic Correspondence Chess Championship. In 1998, Vinje won the 51st European Correspondence Chess Championship (1994-1998). He then also qualified for the World Correspondence Chess Championship final, but did not participate.
