= Correspondence Chess Olympiad =

Correspondence chess tournament

The Correspondence Chess Olympiad is a correspondence chess tournament in which teams from all over the world compete. International Correspondence Chess Federation organises the tournament.

== Correspondence Chess Olympiads ==
Event	Gold	Team	Silver	Bronze
1st (1949–1952)	Hungary	Janos Balogh, Gedeon Barcza, Miklós Szigeti/Jozsef Gonda, Lajos Monostori, Arpad Szücs and Dezsö Elekes.	Czechoslovakia	Sweden
2nd (1952–1955)	Czechoslovakia	Vit Paroulek, Juraj Hukel, Karel Kausek, Valt Borsony, Vilém Olexa and Mirko Skrovina	Sweden	West Germany
3rd (1958–1961)	Soviet Union	Igor Bondarevsky, Georgy Borisenko, Alexander Konstantinopolsky, Vladimir Zagorovsky, Mikhail Yudovich and Piotr Atiashev	Hungary	Yugoslavia
4th (1962–1964)	Soviet Union	Igor Bondarevsky, Peter Dubinin, Georgy Borisenko, Vladimir Zagorovsky, Mikhail Yudovich and Leon Masseiev	East Germany	Sweden
5th (1965–1968)	Czechoslovakia	Josef Snadjr, Frantisek Smrcka, Miroslav Urbanec, Jaroslav Hybl, Milan Weiner and Josef Nun	Soviet Union	West Germany
6th (1968–1972)	Soviet Union	Mikhail Yudovich, Peter Dubinin, Oleg Moiseev, Yuri Sakharov, Abram Khasin and Nikolai Kopylov	Czechoslovakia	East Germany
7th (1972–1976)	Soviet Union	Oleg Moiseev, Abram Khasin, Mikhail Yudovich, Yuri Sakharov, Nikolai Kopylov and Lev Omelchenko	Bulgaria	Great Britain
8th (1977–1982)	Soviet Union	Yakov Estrin, Oleg Moiseev, Abram Khasin, Mikhail Yudovich, Peter Dubinin and Lev Omelchenko	Hungary	Great Britain
9th (1982–1987)	Great Britain	Jonathan Penrose, Adrian Hollis, Simon Webb, John Footner, John Toothill and Cris Shephard	West Germany	Soviet Union
10th (1987–1995)	Soviet Union	Tõnu Õim, Vladimir Zagorovsky, Gennady Nesis, Aleksei Michailov, Grigory Sanakoev and Sergei Korolev	England	East Germany
11th (1992–1999)	Czech Republic & Germany	CZE: Jindrich Zapletal, Alois Lanc, Igor Privara, Milan Mraz, Jindřich Trapl and Jiri Goth/Rudolf Sevecek. GER: Heinrich Burger, Hans Palm, Karl Maeder, Fritz Baumbach, Volker Anton and Martin Kreuzer		Canada and Scotland
12th (1998–2004)	Germany	Joachim Neumann, Manfred Nimtz, Volker Anton, Martin Kreuzer, Stephan Busemann and Karl Maeder	Lithuania	Latvia
13th (2004–2009)	Germany	Fritz Baumbach, Siegfried Kluve, Martin Kreuzer, Robert K. von Weizsäcker, Roland Pfretzschner and Matthias Kribben	Czech Republic	Poland
14th (2002–2006)	Germany	Peter Hertel, Frank Gerhardt, Stephan Busemann, Andreas Brenke, Horst Broß and Hans Hofstetter	Lithuania	United States
15th (2006–2009)	Norway	Ivar Bern, Raymond Boger, Petter Stigar, Arild Haugen, Morten Lilleoren and Tor-Arne Klausen	Germany	Netherlands
16th (2010–2016)	Czech Republic	Roman Chitilek, Jiri Dufek, David Vrkoc and Jiri Vosáhlik	Germany	France
17th (2009–2012)	Germany	Maximilian Voss, Peter Hertel, Arno Nickel, Stephan Busemann, Hans-Dieter Wunderlich and Gerhard Müller	Spain	Italy
18th (2012–2016)	Germany	Peter Hertel, Matthias Kribben, Maximilian Voss, Arno Nickel, Hans-Dieter Wunderlich and Reinhard Moll	Slovenia	Spain
19th (2016–2021)	Bulgaria	Nikolai Ninov, Valentin Dimitrov Iotov, Simeon Vinchev and Krasimir Bochev	Germany	Poland
20th (2016–2019)	Germany	Matthias Kribben, Arno Nickel, Stephan Busemann, Reinhard Moll, Robert Bauer and Matthias Gleichmann	Russia	Spain
21st (2020–2023)	Germany	Matthias Kribben, Stephan Busemann, Hans-Dieter Wunderlich, Robert Bauer, Robert K. von Weizsäcker and Roland del Rio	Luxembourg	United States

== Ladies Correspondence Chess Olympiads ==
N°	Years	Gold	Team	Silver	Bronze
1st	1974–1979	Soviet Union	Olga Rubtsova, Marta Litinskaya, Ljuba Kristol/Tamara Zaitseva and Liudmila Belavenets	West Germany	Czechoslovakia
2nd	1980–1986	Soviet Union	Olga Rubtsova, Lora Yakovleva, Marta Litinskaya and Liudmila Belavenets	Czechoslovakia	Yugoslavia
3rd	1986–1992	Soviet Union	Merike Rõtova, Marta Litinskaya, Liudmila Belavenets and Nadezida Krasikova	Czechoslovakia	Hungary
4th	1992–1997	Czech Republic	Eva Mozná, Mariola Babulová, Hana Kubiková and Vlasta Horácková	Russia	Poland
5th	1997–2003	Russia	Irina Perevertkina, Svetlana Khlusevich, Tamara Zaitseva and Elena Rufitskaya	Germany	Czech Republic
6th	2003–2006	Lithuania	Vilma Dambrauskaité, Vineta Kveinys, Vigante Milasiuté and Jelizaveta Potapova	Germany	Italy
7th	2007–2009	Slovenia	Maia Nadvesnik, Lara Kozarski, Eva Korosec and Anica Horvat	Lithuania	Germany
8th	2008–2010	Poland	Barbara Skonieczna, Alicla Szczepaniak, Bronislawa Lubas and Bozena Wojcik-Wojtkowiak	Bulgaria	Italy
9th	2011–2014	Russia	Olga Sukhareva, Larisa Morokova, Oksana Zhak and Svetlana Lobanova	Lithuania	Germany
10th	2015–2017	Germany	Svetlana Kloster, Barbara Boltz, Kristin Achatz and Irene Neuburger	Lithuania	Russia

== See also ==
- Chess Olympiad
- ICCF national member federations—Short articles about the federations
- ICCF numeric notation
- World Correspondence Chess Championship
- International Correspondence Chess Federation
- European Team Chess Championship
