= Wolfgang Galow =

German chess player and photographer

Personal information
- Full name: Wolfgang Paul Galow
- Born: 21 September 1956 Landshut, Germany

Chess career
- Country: Germany
- Title: Correspondence Chess International Master (1997)
- ICCF rating: 2448 (1998)

Wolfgang Paul Galow (born 21 September 1956 in Landshut, Germany) is a German chess player and photographer.

== Photography ==
Wolfgang Galow is a photographer in Munich, Germany, known mainly for photographing chess players, architectural photography and wedding photography (formerly with Beata Zys, now alone). He is a co-founder of Lichtschmiede München, an association operating a photo studio. In 2009 Wolfgang Galow won first prize in an international architectural photography competition, the Polish DIGITAL FOTO VIDEO. His photographs have appeared in magazines of Minolta, the German Association of Photography (DVF), Color-Foto, Color-Foto-Creativ, Profi-Foto and fotoMAGAZIN. He was represented at several group exhibitions and had a solo exhibition, for example, at the Kulturzentrum 2411 in Hasenbergl (Munich). Both as a photographer and as a chess player, he is self-taught.

== Chess ==
=== Correspondence chess ===
In correspondence chess he won his first national master class tournament M/886 in 1982/83 and later also international master class tournaments in European and World tournaments. Thus he qualified for European and World Championships. In 1997 he was awarded the title of International Master in Correspondence Chess. He achieved the norms for this at the 1994–2000 European Championship, won by Fatih Atakişi, where he finished eighth, and at the 2nd semi-final of the 21st World Championship 1995–2000, where he missed the grandmaster norm by only half a point, finishing second behind Ralf Barten with 10.5 points from 14 games. In 1997, he played the final of the 27th German Correspondence Chess Championship after having qualified for it in the preliminary round with a split 1st/2nd place.

In 1991 he founded the correspondence chess team of the Landshut Chess Club and led it via two qualifying rounds 1991–1993 and 1993–1995 into the 1st German Correspondence Chess League 1995–1997, where he played on the first board and scored 3.5 points in 8 games. Afterwards he ended his correspondence chess career and let the qualification for the 3/4 final of the 21st World Correspondence Chess Championship expire unused. In 1997 the German Correspondence Chess Federation awarded him the Silver Badge of Honor. His highest rating in correspondence chess was 2448 in 1998.

=== Over-the-board chess ===
He was introduced to chess in 1971 in the chess club of Landshut. In 1976 he became Lower Bavarian youth champion in blitz chess. In the 1980s he was temporarily with Münchener SC 1836 and won its club championship in 1986. Later he returned to the chess club of Landshut. After a longer break from chess he joined the chess department of FC Bayern Munich. His highest Elo rating in over-the-board chess was 2129, which he had from July 1999 to October 2015.
