= David Taylor (chess player) =

American chess player and author

David C. Taylor (born May 30, 1941) was the seventh U.S. Correspondence Chess Champion. He is the author of a book on the Ponziani Opening. Taylor lives in Kankakee, Illinois.

== Works ==
- Dunne, Alex; Taylor, David (1990). Center Counter Uprising. Thinkers' Press. ISBN 978-0938650492.
- Taylor, David; Hayward, Keith (2010). Play the Ponziani. Everyman Chess. ISBN 978-1857446203.

== Sample games ==
Position: g1 white king, f1 white rook, c1 white bishop, h2 white pawn, g2 white pawn, a2 white pawn, f3 white rook, d3 white queen, c3 white pawn, b3 white bishop, f4 white pawn, e4 black rook, c4 white pawn, f5 black pawn, d5 white pawn, c5 black pawn, f6 black knight, d6 black pawn, b6 black pawn, a6 black bishop, h7 black pawn, g7 black pawn, e7 black rook, a7 black pawn, g8 black king, e8 black queen

Position after 28.Rdf1
- James Bovay III–David Taylor, 7th USCCC Final 1989:
  1.c4 e5 2.Nc3 Nc6 3.Nf3 f5 4.d4 e4 5.Ng5 Bb4 6.Nh3 Nf6 7.e3 Bxc3+ 8.bxc3 d6 9.Ba3 0-0 10.Be2 Ne7 11.0-0 c6 12.Qb3 Ng6 13.Rae1 Qe7 14.Qb4 Rd8 15.Bd1 b6 16.Nf4 Nxf4 17.exf4 c5 18.Qb3 Qf7 19.f3 Re8 20.Qb1 Re7 21.Bc2 Bb7 22.d5 Ba6 23.Bb3 exf3 24.Rxf3 Rae8 25.Rd1 Re4 26.Qd3 R8e7 27.Bc1 Qe8 28.Rdf1 (see diagram) 28...b5 29.cxb5 Qxb5 30.c4 Rxc4 31.Bxc4 Qxc4 32.Qa3 Nxd5 33.Bb2 h6 34.Rc1 Qe2 35.Rf2 Qe1+ 36.Rf1 Qe3+ 37.Qxe3 Nxe3 38.Rfe1 Re4 39.g3 Nc4 40.Bc3 d5 41.Be5 d4 42.Bb8 d3 43.Red1 d2 44.Ra1 Re2 45.Be5 Ne3 0–1
- David Taylor–GM Arthur Bisguier, US Open, Chicago 1973:
  1.e4 e5 2.Nf3 Nc6 3.d4 exd4 4.c3 dxc3 5.Bc4 cxb2 6.Bxb2 Bb4+ 7.Nc3 d6 8.Qb3 Nh6 9.0-0-0 Bxc3 10.Qxc3 f6 11.Rhe1 Bg4 12.e5 fxe5 13.Bd5 Bxf3 14.gxf3 Qd7 15.Qb3 Rd8 16.Qxb7 Ne7 17.f4 Nxd5 18.Qxd5 c6 19.Qb3 d5 20.Rxe5+ Kf7 21.Qc3 Rhg8 22.Rde1 Nf5 23.Qh3 Nd6 24.Qxh7 Rb8 25.Re7+ Qxe7 26.Rxe7+ Kxe7 27.Bxg7 Nf7 28.Qg6 Rxg7 29.Qxg7 Rh8 30.Qg3 and White later won.

== See also ==
- Correspondence chess
- ICCF
- ICCF U.S.A.
