= Tim Harding (chess player) =

British chess player and writer (born 1948)

Personal information
- Born: May 6, 1948 (age 78) London, England

Chess career
- Country: Ireland
- Title: Candidate Master (2015)
- Peak rating: 2250 (January 1981)

Timothy David Harding (born 6 May 1948 in London) is a chess player and author with particular expertise in correspondence chess. He has lived in Dublin since 1976, writing a weekly column for The Sunday Press from then until 1995. Harding published a correspondence chess magazine Chess Mail from 1996 to 2006 and authored "The Kibitzer", a ChessCafe.com column from 1996 until 2015. In 2002, he was awarded the title Senior International Master of Correspondence Chess by the International Correspondence Chess Federation. He received the FIDE title of Candidate Master (CM) in 2015.

In 2009, Harding received a PhD degree in history from University of Dublin, with his thesis on correspondence chess in Britain and Ireland, 1824–1914.

He is credited with coining the name Frankenstein–Dracula Variation in his 1975 Vienna Game book.

== Partial bibliography ==
- Joseph Henry Blackburne: A Chess Biography (McFarland & Co., Inc. 2015)
- Eminent Victorian Chess Players: Ten Biographies (McFarland & Co., Inc. 2012)
- The Write Move (Chess Mail Ltd., 2005)
- 50 Golden Chess Games (Chess Mail Ltd., 2004)
- Red Letters with CC-GM Sergey Grodzensky (Chess Mail Ltd., 2003)
- 64 Great Chess Games (Chess Mail Ltd., 2002)
- Counter Gambits (Dover, 2001)
- Startling Correspondence Chess Miniatures (Chess Mail Ltd., 2000)
- Why You Lose At Chess, 2nd ed. (Dover, 2001)
- Four Gambits To Beat The French (Chess Digest, 1998).
- Play The Evans Gambit, rev. ed. [with Bernard Cafferty] (Cadogan, 1997)
- Winning at Correspondence Chess (Batsford, May 1996).
- Better Chess For Average Players (Dover, 1996; Oxford University Press, 1977)
- Evans Gambit and a System v Two Knights Defense, 2nd ed (Chess Digest, 1996)
- The Fighting Fajarowicz (Chess Digest, 1995)
- The Classical French (Batsford, 1991)
- The Marshall Attack [largely by GM John Nunn] (Batsford, 1989)
- Dynamic White Openings AND Dynamic Black Defenses (Chess Digest 1989)
- The Games of the World Correspondence Championships I-X, rev. ed.(Batsford, 1987)
- Openings for the Club Player [with Leonard Barden] (1987)
- Irregular Openings for the 1990s (Chess Digest, 1986)
- The New Chess Computer Book (Pergamon Press, 1985)
- Ponziani Opening (Chess Digest 1984)
- Philidor's Defense, A Reappraisal (Chess Digest 1984)
- Nimzowitsch Defence (1981)
- Queen's Gambit Declined: Semi-Slav [ed. A.J.Whiteley] (Batsford, 1981)
- French: MacCutcheon and Advance Lines (Batsford, 1979)
- French: Classical Lines [with W.Heidenfeld] (Batsford, 1979)
- Colle, London and Blackmar-Diemer Systems (Batsford, 1979)
- Better Chess for Average Players (Oxford Uni Press, 1978)
- Spanish (Ruy Lopez): Marshall (1977)
- The Italian Game [with G.S.Botterill] (1977)
- The Scotch [mostly by G.S.Botterill] (1977)
- The Leningrad Dutch (1976)
- The Batsford Guide To Chess Openings [with Leonard Barden] (1976)
- Sicilian: …e5 [with P.R.Markland] (1976)
- Vienna Opening (Chess Player, 1976)
- The Sicilian Richter-Rauzer [with P.R.Markland] (1975)
- The Sicilian Sozin [with G.S.Botterill & C.Kottnauer] (1974)
- The Marshall Attack [with R.G.Wade] (1974)
- Counter Gambits (British Chess Magazine, 1974)
- Bishop's Opening (Chess Player, 1973)

== Electronic publications ==
CDs:

- UltraCorr3a (2010)
- UltraCorr3 (2009)
- UltraCorr2 (2008)
- UltraCorr CD-ROM (Chess Mail Ltd., 2006)
- MegaCorr4 CD-ROM (Chess Mail Ltd., 2003)
- MegaCorr3 CD-ROM (Chess Mail Ltd., 2003)
- The Total Marshall (CD-ROM) (Chess Mail Ltd., 2002)
- MegaCorr2 CD-ROM (Chess Mail Ltd., 2001)
- MegaCorr CD-ROM (Chess Mail Ltd., 1999)
- Correspondence Chess World CD-ROM (Chess Mail, 1998)
