= ICCF U.S.A. =

American chess organization

ICCF U.S.A. is the member of the International Correspondence Chess Federation (ICCF) for the territory of the United States of America. The organization was formed in 1909 as Correspondence Chess League of New York but quickly expanded to become the Correspondence Chess League of America (CCLA). It has published The Chess Correspondent regularly since 1930.

== History ==
The Correspondence Chess League of America (CCLA) was the first American chess club to become an ICCF affiliate. It was created in 1917 as a merger of four clubs, one of which was a Canadian club. The number of Canadians in CCLA diminished after the Canadian Chess Association took over the Canadian Correspondence Chess Championship.

CCLA accepted the invitation of the International Correspondence Chess Association (ICCA) to become a member in 1946. Participation began in 1947 with a team of 100 players competing against teams from Belgium, England, Finland, France, Holland, and Sweden conducted by ICCA. The first time the US was invited to play in an ICCF Olympiad event was in 1958. This was the Final Olympiad III team tourney in which the USSR was invited also to enter a team for the first time.

Walter Muir took over the CCLA post of ICCF-US Secretary in 1969. Muir started playing chess in 1917 and didn't stop until shortly before his death in December 1999. Muir's father was Canadian. As a result, Muir was active in both US and Canadian chess. He won the Canadian CCA championship eight times between 1928 and 1942. He is the first native born American to earn an ICCF Master Title. He had 520 games rated by ICCF at the end of 1997. He was awarded an Honorary Membership in ICCF in 1998.

Muir's promotional efforts increased US participation in ICCF events. He worked with John Cleeve of Canada to establish an ICCF North American Championship Invitational Tournament with five Canadian and ten USA players to be selected by the ICCF Secretaries of both countries. The North American Champion would be seeded into the World Championship Final. Today the winner is entered in only the ¾ final. The 1970 ICCF Congress agreed to this. The winner of the First North American Invitational Chess Championship was Robert G. Cross of the United States in 1971.

In 1974, John Cleeve was the first North American to attend an ICCF Presidium meeting, at that time in Nice, France. The knowledge received there was useful to both countries to create opportunities for their players. Walter Muir realized that the USA needed an ICCF affiliate that could represent members of all US clubs. He created the United States Postal Chess Union (USPCU) to be that US affiliate. He drafted a constitution with a President and Advisory Council with himself continuing as ICCF-US Director. Muir also began recruiting top non CCLA players to compete in ICCF events as well as to compete in the CCLA member only US Championship. The cost of the USPCU operation was borne entirely by the fees paid by US players participating in ICCF events. This did not solve all the problems since CCLA was still the official delegate to ICCF. By 1977 CCLA also presented a draft of an "umbrella organization" that was acceptable to ICCF.

The United States Postal Chess Federation, USPCF, became that organization with its own constitution. Initially it provided access for international postal play for members of CCLA, United States Chess Federation (USCF), American Postal Chess Tournaments (APCT). kNights of the Square Table (NOST) and The Chess Connection (TCC) later joined. Robert A. Karch served as ICCF-US Secretary for over five years.

Max Zavanelli took over as ICCF-US Secretary in June 1987.

When Zavanelli took over, Victor Palciauskas and Hans Berliner were the only ICCF-US Grandmasters (GMs). As of the current editing (May, 2013), there are now 9 more GMs; Alik S. Zilberberg 1994, Joseph A. de Mauro 1997, Robin Smith and John C. Timm 2004, Dr. Jason Bokar 2007, Daniel M. Fleetwood 2008, Dr. Edward Duliba 2009, Jon Ostriker 2101, and Stephen Ham 2011. Two women, Dr. G. L. Langan and Dr. C. A. Rosenfield, have attained the International Ladies Master title.

In 2007 Ruth Ann Fay received the Bertl von Massow award for meritorious service after serving as ICCF-US Secretary for seven years, and serving as NAPZ Director, with Dr. Bokar as the Deputy Director. Corky Schakel became ICCF-US Secretary (the title changed to ICCF-US National Federation Representative or Delegate), and served as NAPZ Director from 2007 to 2011 until Dr. Jason Bokar took over as NAPZ Director. Dr. Michael Millstone is the current ICCF General Secretary (as of May, 2013).

Jason Bokar also took over from Corky Schakel as National Delegate in 2015. Dr. Bokar received his Bertl von Massow award in 2018 for meritorious service after serving as NAPZ Deputy Director, NAPZ Director, World Zone Director and ICCF-US National Delegate over the years 2001-2018.

Other notable people inside ICCF-US are Dennis Doren, Friendly Match organizer and ICCF Rules Commissioner; Tom Biedermann who serves as ICCF Entry Commissioner and ICCF-US Deputy Director and Treasurer.

== World Champions from the United States of America ==
The United States of America has had two World Champions. The first, GM Hans Berliner, won the Fifth World Championship in 1968. He was one of the top over-the-board players in the 1950s when he switched to correspondence chess. He won the Championship by qualifying through a series of preliminary events. He is the first person to be initiated into the (US) Chess Hall of Fame based on his correspondence record of 90 wins, 8 draws and 1 loss.

GM Victor Palciauskas won the Tenth World Championship in 1984. He was nominated for a vacancy in the Finals because of his excellent performance in the North American Invitational Correspondence Chess Championship II. He had earned the GM title in 1983.

== Olympiad teams ==
USA teams have played in the Olympiad essentially since their beginning (which officially started in 1949). The USA team has made it into the finals in 11 of the 18 Olympiads to have been played that far: (a) the 2nd Olympiad, ending 4th (b) the 3rd Olympiad, ending 10th (c) the 5th Olympiad, ending 8th (d) the 8th Olympiad, ending 13th (e) the 11th Olympiad, ending 12th (f) the 13th Olympiad, ending tied for 7th-10th (g) the 14th Olympiad, ending with a bronze medal (in 3rd) (h) the 15th Olympiad, ending tied for 10th-11th (i) the 16th Olympiad, currently in progress (j) the 17th Olympiad, currently in progress (k) the 18th Olympiad, currently in progress.

== History of the US Correspondence Chess Championships ==
The ICCF affiliate has the right to hold national championships. The first tournament began July 1, 1972. The USCCC is played in two rounds with new preliminaries beginning every two years. At first only the Final was rated by ICCF. The winner qualifies for the World Championship semifinals.

== US Correspondence Chess Champions ==
A full description of the US Correspondence Chess Championship can be found here. Champions are listed below.

		Play started	Play ended
1	R. Anthony Cayford	1974	1976
2	Dr. Eugene Martinovsky	1976	1978
3	Dr. Victor Contoski	1978	1980
4	Curtis W. Carlson	1980	1982
5	Paul T. Fielding and Kiven J. Plesset	1983	1985
6	Robert I. Reynolds	1985	1987
7	David C. Taylor	1987	1990
8	Marc J. Lonoff and Dr. Eugene Martinovsky	1990	1993
9	Stephen Jones	1991	1993
10	Jon Edwards	1993	1997
11	Stephen Jones, Timothy Murray and Robin Smith	1995	1998
12	Craig Jones and Konstantin Dolgitser	1997	2000
13	Robin Smith	1999-08-02	2002-01-31
14	Randy Schmidt	2002-09-30	2008-04-25
15	Dr. Edward Duliba	2003-10-06	2006-09-07
16	Thomas Biedermann and Lawrence Coplin	2007-10-15	2008-11-30
17	Dr. Edward Duliba	2008-01-21	2010-07-21
18	John Ballow	2009-12-01	2011-10-22
19	Wolff Morrow and Dr. Carl Siefring	2012-07-04	2014-02-08
20	Grayling V. Hill	2014-03-01	
21	Oliver Koo	2018-	
22	Thomas Biedermann and Kenneth Reinhart	2020-3-31	

== Year 2000 ICCF Congress ==
The United States hosted the ICCF Congress in Daytona Beach, Florida in September 2000. This was only the second time the Congress had not been held in Europe. It provided an opportunity for the titled US players to meet and play the "Rest of the World" in a special evening chess event. The US lost the match. Attendees included both US World Champions and delegates and friends from 20 nations.

== See also ==
- ICCF national member federations
- World Correspondence Chess Championship
