= Stefan Brzózka =

Polish chess player (1931–2023)

Personal information
- Born: 5 October 1931 Radomsko, Poland
- Died: 7 January 2023 (aged 91) Częstochowa, Poland

Chess career
- Country: Poland
- Title: ICCF Grandmaster (1985)
- ICCF rating: 2433 (October 2001)
- ICCF peak rating: 2574 (July 1999)

Stefan Brzózka (5 October 1931 – 7 January 2023) was the first Polish chess player to receive the chess title of Correspondence Chess Grandmaster (1985).

== Chess career ==
From 1953 to 1966, Brzózka participated eleven times in Polish Chess Championships final. His best result was fourth place in 1953. He won the Polish Team Chess Championship four times (1958, 1968, 1970, 1974) and once won the Polish Team Fast Chess Championship (1968).

He played for Poland in the Chess Olympiad:

- In 1958, at second reserve board in the 13th Chess Olympiad in Munich (+4, =1, -4).

Brzózka played for Poland in the European Team Chess Championship preliminaries:

- In 1957, at tenth board in the 1st European Team Chess Championship preliminaries (+0, =1, -1).
- In 1961, at fourth board in the 2nd European Team Chess Championship preliminaries (+1, =1, -3).

He played for Poland in the World Student Team Chess Championships:

- In 1955, at second board in the 2nd World Student Team Chess Championship in Lyon (+4, =3, -5),
- In 1956, at first board in the 3rd World Student Team Chess Championship in Uppsala (+2, =3, -1).

In 1967, Brzózka withdrew from the active chess tournament, devoting himself to correspondence chess where achieving significant successes. In 1966 he won Polish Correspondence Chess Championship. Brzózka was a participant in the 16th World Correspondence Chess Championship (1999–2004).
