= JPCA =

JPCA may refer to:

- The Journal of Physical Chemistry A, a scientific journal
- Japan Photographic Copyright Association a copyright collection society
- Japan Postal Chess Association, an ICCF national member federation
- Japan Primary Care Association, an academic association for family medicine doctors in Japan
