= Svetlana Zainetdinova =

Estonian chess player

Personal information
- Born: 19 October 1962 (age 63) Ufa, Russia

Chess career
- Country: Soviet Union; Estonia
- Title: Woman FIDE Master (2006); ICCF Lady Grandmaster (2009)
- FIDE rating: 2123 (April 2019)
- Peak rating: 2129 (May 2014)
- ICCF rating: 2421 (July 2009)
- ICCF peak rating: 2421 (July 2009)

Svetlana Zainetdinova (born 19 October 1962 in Ufa) is an Estonian chess player who holds the FIDE title of Woman FIDE Master (WFM, 2006) and ICCF title of Lady Grandmaster (LGM, 2009).

== Biography ==
In 1979, Svetlana Zainetdinova graduated from secondary school in Ufa. She started play chess in Ufa's Pioneers Palace. In 1984, Svetlana Zainetdinova has graduated from the Russian Institute of Physical Culture and works as a trainer.

Since 1984 she has been working as a chess coach in Kohtla-Järve, and since 2002 she is a member of board in the local chess club "Diagonal".

In Estonian Women's Chess Championship Svetlana Zainetdinova has won gold (1985) and silver medals (2000). She is a correspondence chess player who holds the titles of Lady International Correspondence Chess Master (LIM, 2006), Lady International Correspondence Chess Grand Master (LGM, 2009), International Correspondence Chess Master (IM, 2009).
