= ICCF Belarus =

ICCF Belarus belongs to the ICCF national member federations.

== Creation of BCCC ==
In 1992 in Belarus the Belorussian Committee of Correspondence Chess (BCCC) has been organized.

== Champions ==
The national champions since 1992 are: Gennady Libov, Vladimir Oleshkevich, Anatoly Solotinsky, Mikhail Klimenok, Boris Blitsko, Ivan Skvira, Boris Blitsko, Leonid Shetko, Alexei Malashenkov and Yury Bakulin

== Titled players ==
=== Grandmaster ===
- Dmitry Vitalievich Lybin

=== Senior International Master ===
- Boris Mikhailovich Blitsko
- Vladislav Cheslavovich Dubko
- Alexandr Sergeevich Ivanov
- Mikhail Ivanovich Shablinsky
- Sergei Ulasevich

=== Lady International Master ===
- Tatyana Sergeevna Kozenko

=== International Master ===
- Igor Victorovich Korshunov
- Alexei Malashenko
- Anatoly Vladimirovich Osipov
- Vasily Victorovich Primakov
- Abram Yakovlevich Roizman (+)
- Petr Vasilievich Skripko
- Sergey Vadimovich Toldaev (+)
- Anatoly Pavlovich Voitsekh (+)
