= Wibe =

Wibe is a Norwegian surname. Notable people with the name include:

- Ellen Wibe (born 1965), Norwegian communications worker
- Håkon Wibe-Lund (born 1980), Norwegian football defender
- Pernille Wibe (born 1988), Norwegian handball player
- Sören Wibe (1946–2010), Swedish economist
- Terje Wibe (born 1947), Norwegian chess player
