= Aldrete =

Aldrete is a surname. Notable people with the surname include:

- Adrián Aldrete (born 1988), Mexican footballer
- Gregory S. Aldrete (born 1966), American academic and writer
- Jorge Aldrete Lobo (1940–2020), Mexican chess master
- Mike Aldrete (born 1961), American baseball player
- Sara Aldrete (born 1964), Mexican serial killer
