= Internationaler Fernschachbund =

International correspondence chess organization

The Internationaler Fernschachbund (IFSB) was an international correspondence chess organisation, founded in 1928 and dissolved in 1939. It was superseded in 1945 by the International Correspondence Chess Association (ICCA) and after a restructuring in 1951 adopted the name of the International Correspondence Chess Federation (ICCF).

== Creation ==
In August 1928 the Internationaler Correspondensschachbund (ICSB), was created under the leadership of Erich Otto Freienhagen in Berlin. This group had existed in a loose form since November 1927, and included J.W. Keemink, H. W. von Massow, K. Laue, C. Olsen and F. Schild. This was the first successful attempt to create an international correspondence chess federation. Unfortunately, it survived for only a short period, although its successor proved to be viable.

On 2 December 1928 a new federation was formed in Berlin. To distinguish it from its predecessor, it was named the Internationaler Fernschachbund. The founders were Dr. Rudolf Duhrssen (first President), Johannes W. Keemink (second President), Hans Werner von Massow (first secretary), Kurt Laue (first Treasurer), and L. Probst (Managing Editor). It was said that the federation had been founded by "four madmen and a child", as von Massow was just 16 years old at the time. He was born on 13/5/1912 (Gaige's "Chess Personalia"). There appears to have been a major row at the December 1928 meeting which caused the splitting off of Freienhagen (and possibly others) from the Duhrssen faction. Freienhagen continued to be active in organising correspondence chess until shortly before his death. He published Brief-Schach until September 1932, but only some of these publications have survived and so our knowledge of his organisation is fragmented.

Keemink was Dutch and the others were German. Freienhagen and other ICSB members had already left the group and Freienhagen died in May 1933. After this, correspondence chess players began joining IFSB. At that time, there was only individual membership and only later did it become possible for countries to be members.

== Tasks ==
The organization undertook several tasks:

- It launched the magazine Fernschach to organize and provide information about international correspondence chess.
- It created work and tournament links between organizers and the top European correspondence chess players.
- It organized official individual and team tournaments.
- It developed unified rules and practice.

== BM tournaments ==
The IFSB invited its members (players) to take part: the elite in the Master Class, the average players in Class I and the less average in Class II. The structure of IFSB Bundesmeisterschafts (BM), the most significant individual tournaments, was established. They began at the beginning of each year and were to be complete by the end of the next year. Winners of the IFSB-BM (unofficial European championship) were I. Eugen Busch (Germany) and Eduard Dyckhoff (Germany), 1929/30; II. Eduard Dyckhoff (Germany), 1930/1; III. Arthur Priwonitz (Germany), 1931/2; IV. Hans Müller (Austria), 1932/3; V. Marcel Duchamp (France), 1933/4; VI. Hilding Persson (Sweden), 1934/5; VII. Paul Keres (Estonia), 1935/6; VIII. Milan Vidmar (Yugoslavia), 1936/7; IX. Miklós Szigeti (Hungary), 1937/8 and X. Edmund Adam (Germany), 1938/9.

== Leader meetings ==
Six months after it was established, the leaders of the IFSB met again, in Duisburg on 21 July 1929. There were now over 100 individual members.

Another meeting was held in Hamburg on 26 July 1930. Here K. Allmendinger and Dr. E. Dyckhoff, both German, joined the governing body, and F. Kunert (Austria), M. Seibold (Germany), Dr. K. Schørring (Denmark), V. Geier (Poland) and H.L. van Borgman (the Netherlands) came into the broader management. The 6-board national matches between Germany and Spain, and Germany and Austria were started in March 1931 under the auspices of the IFSB. This was the first step towards the future correspondence chess Olympiads, which from 1935 to the present day have been played on 6 boards.

On 30 August 1931 there was a meeting in Dresden where it was stated that 43% of the competitors in the tournaments were not German, thus demonstrating its truly international nature. The majority of countries in Europe, from Portugal to Poland, and from Italy to Scandinavia took part in the tournaments. Compared to their size and significance in terms of chess, there were very few players from the Soviet Union or Great Britain.

The next meeting of the governing body was held in Munich on 15 May 1932. Here the "Game Committee" under the German name Spielausschess was formed. Its members performed three tasks:

- Selecting the participants of the BM for each year from applicants.
- Adjudicating unfinished games.
- Dealing with complaints about the tournament director's decisions.

These tasks required high standards, both as chess players and ethically. The first three members of the committee were Dr. J. Balogh, F. Batik and Prof. E. Busch. Due to later changes Marcel Duchamp, Seibold, Herzog, Johansson and Dr. Rey also fulfilled this task.

== First member meeting ==
On 22 April 1934, the Federation's governing body met for the sixth time and there was the first meeting of IFSB members in Berlin. The most important issue was the correspondence chess Olympiad for European countries. This started in January 1935 with the preliminaries and final taking five years altogether, and were planned every 5 years. The tournament's chief promoters were Kunert and von Massow, and they also devised the plan for the tournament.

== Change in management ==
A significant change occurred in the management of the IFSB in 1935:

- 1st President, Dr. K. Schorring (Denmark)
- 2nd President, István Abonyi (Hungary)
- 1st Secretary, Hans Werner von Massow
- 1st Treasurer E. Weiss (Germany)
- 1st Tournament Director, F. Kunert (Austria)
- Head of federation Magazine (Fernschach) Dr. R. Duhrssen (Germany)

The office holders belonging to the broader management were also listed as Dr. W. Bickel (Switzerland) and Marcel Duchamp (France) as adjudicators. The positions of the 2nd Minutes Secretary, 2nd Treasurer, 2nd Tournament Director and one adjudicator remained unfilled for the time being. In 1935, there were more changes in personnel: Dr. Schorring and Kunert retired. On 15 January the correspondence chess Olympiad of European countries began with 17 teams from 14 countries. The July 1935 issue of Fernschach reported on the reorganization and new office holders of the federation.

== Governing body meetings ==
From 4–6 August 1935 the governing body held a meeting in Dresden. Here they decided to create and award the title of Correspondence Chess Master. It was also resolved that countries, as well as individuals, could become IFSB members. In January 1936 Fernschach announced the names of the first six countries to join: Hungary, the Netherlands, Spain, Norway, Latvia and Czechoslovakia. A financial committee was also formed. At the same time Dr. Max Euwe, the OTB world champion was also a member of the IFSB. According to another announcement, Alexander Alekhine was also a member.

The IFSB's next meeting was held in Munich on 31 August 1936, as the OTB Olympiad was being played there. A working party was formed to devise a system for the individual Correspondence Chess World Championship, whose members were Dr. Adam, Chalupetzky, Alekhine, Duchamp, Dr. M. Henneberger, J. Nielsen and G. Stalda. However, the contest did not take place due to the outbreak of World War II, and was only organized years later by the ICCA.

The following meeting was in Stockholm on 10 August 1937. The World Chess Federation FIDE also held its meeting then, and the chess Olympiad was held at the same time. Dr. Alexander Rueb, FIDE President and former correspondence chess player (the IFSB's first and only honorary member), world champion Dr. M. Euwe, and L. Collijn, president of the Swedish Chess Federation, visited the IFSB meeting. The proposed plan for the Correspondence Chess World Championship was accepted. By the end of 1937, the IFSB had 18 member countries; a great success considering there were still no regular airmail services throughout the world, which limited IFSB tournaments to European players. The same was true of individual tournaments in the United States, and it was impossible to involve either European or Asian competitors.

== Final years and disbandment ==
By 1938 and 1939 political tensions were rising, and most important tournaments were successfully concluded before the war. The last pre-war issue of Fernschach gave the 1938-1939 BM crosstable, as well as the results of the Correspondence Chess Olympiad of European countries. The leadership of IFSB looked back at the past and expressed hope for a better future, in the following quotation: "In these fateful hard times, we are sending our voice to all of our friends: to each chess-organiser of national chess federations, to chess masters, to all of our members and sponsors, to the subscribers of our monthly journal and to all who are somehow connected with the IFSB and its work. ….. The presidency of the IFSB decided to cease all the work of IFSB and publication of this monthly journal during the war. …. We hope for a future, in which instead of deadly projectiles, again the chess post-cards shall wander through the boundaries of nations as heralds of international understanding in the world. We hope, this future shall be in not too long a time, before it is a happy present!"
