= Jon Edwards (chess player) =

American chess player (born 1953)

Jon Edwards, born 1953, is an American chess player. He won the 32nd World Correspondence Chess Championship in 2022.

Edwards started playing correspondence chess via the International Correspondence Chess Federation in 1995, becoming an ICCF Grandmaster in 2022.
