= Jindřich Trapl =

Czech chess player

Personal information
- Born: 24 March 1942
- Died: 29 March 2010 (aged 68)

Chess career
- Country: Czechoslovakia; Czech Republic
- Title: International Master (1977)
- Peak rating: 2415 (July 1987)

Jindřich Trapl (24 March 1942 – 29 March 2010), was a Czech chess International Master (IM) (1977), Czechoslovak Chess Championship medalist (1967), European Team Chess Championship individual medalist (1961).

== Biography ==
From the early 1960s to the early 1970s, Jindřich Trapl was one of the leading Czechoslovak chess players. He was a multiple participant in the Czechoslovak Chess Championships, where he achieved his best in 1967 when he became a bronze medalist behind winner Július Kozma and silver medalist Jan Smejkal. In 1977, Jindřich Trapl was awarded the FIDE International Master (IM) title.

Jindřich Trapl played for Czechoslovakia in Chess Olympiads participated 2 times (1962, 1972); and in the European Team Chess Championship participated in 1961 and won individual gold medal.

In later years, Jindřich Trapl active participated in correspondence chess tournaments. He won with Czech Republic team 11th Correspondence Chess Olympiad (1992–1999).
