= César Augusto Blanco Gramajo =

Guatemalan chess player (born 1959)

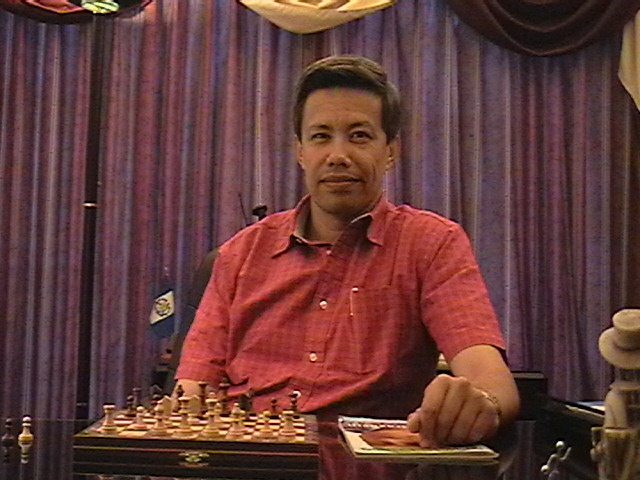
- Blanco in 2003

Personal information
- Born: 14 January 1959 (age 67) Guatemala City, Guatemala

Chess career
- Country: Guatemala
- Title: ICCF Grandmaster (2003); FIDE Candidate Master (2018)
- FIDE rating: 2065 (March 2020)
- Peak rating: 2136 (January 2011)
- ICCF rating: 2479 (October 2021)
- ICCF peak rating: 2594 (October 2005)

César Augusto Blanco Gramajo (born 14 January 1959) is a Guatemalan chess player who holds the ICCF title of Grandmaster (2003) and the FIDE title of Candidate Master (2018). He primarily plays correspondence chess, and has twice been Latin American champion in this modality.

== Early life ==
Blanco was born in Guatemala City, Guatemala. He received a business administration degree from San Carlos University in Guatemala, and his thesis was awarded as the best in the country (1985) in the economics area. He also got an MBA – graduated as cum laude – in Finance from Francisco Marroquin University, also in Guatemala City.

== Chess career ==
Blanco started to play chess in 1972 when the Championship match between Bobby Fischer and Boris Spassky called the attention of the world toward chess. He also represented his country in the 31st Chess Olympiad in Moscow, 1994.

By post, Blanco started to play around 1974 (when he was only 15 years old). The passion for the game increased with the years, but professional activity limited his participation in "live tournaments". On the other side, postal chess became his main source of activity to keep up to date with chess.

He won the XIII and XIV CADAP zonal championships. He received the CADAP Master title in 1985, then the IM title from ICCF in 1996, the SIM title in 1999 and he became the first Postal Chess Grandmaster (GM) title of the Mexican, Central America and Caribbean area in 2003.

Due to working reasons, Blanco left Guatemala and became a member of the US Chess Federation around 1998. He played several tournaments around the US and got his FIDE rating under the US federation.

Currently, Blanco is living back in Guatemala and continues to play chess over the board and correspondence (online, by email or postal mail) chess.

== Occupation ==
Blanco was vice president and director of finance and administration of Kellogg's Latin America region from 2000 until his early retirement in 2007. He previously worked for Bank of America, PepsiCo, and Citibank.

== Personal life ==
Blanco married Vivian Bock in 1983, and the couple have three children: María Alejandra, an architect living in Germany, Pablo Andrés (an organizational psychologist) and Valeria.

== Post retirement activities ==
Blanco -already in his retirement- began to stream on Twitch in September 2021. His nickname is (Betobetun), focusing on strategy, tactics, and analysis of games.. Blanco continued to play over the board chess in his country. During the last 20 years he has played 10 finals of the national championship, the last one in 2025.
