= Rodolfo Redolfi =

Argentine chess player

Personal information
- Full name: Rodolfo Argentino Redolfi
- Born: 28 May 1928 Córdoba, Argentina
- Died: 2 December 2013 (aged 85) Córdoba, Argentina

Chess career
- Country: Argentina
- Title: ICCF Grandmaster (1994)
- ICCF rating: 2450 (October 2000)
- ICCF peak rating: 2524 (July 1997)

Rodolfo Argentino Redolfi (28 May 1928 – 2 December 2013), was an Argentine chess player who held the ICCF title of Correspondence Chess Grandmaster (1994). He was a Chess Olympiad team bronze medal winner (1958).

== Biography ==
Rodolfo Redolfi started playing chess at the age of sixteen. He ten times won the Córdoba Province Chess Championships (1952, 1953, 1954, 1956, 1957, 1959, 1960, 1972, 1979, 1988). Rodolfo Redolfi participated in the Argentine Chess Championship finals, where he showed the best result in 1958, when he shared second place with Oscar Panno behind Hermann Pilnik.

Rodolfo Redolfi played for Argentina in the Chess Olympiad:

- In 1958, at fourth board in the 13th Chess Olympiad in Munich (+3, =4, -2).

Rodolfo Redolfi played for Argentina in the World Student Team Chess Championship:

- In 1958, at third board in the 5th World Student Team Chess Championship in Varna (+5, =2, -3).

Rodolfo Redolfi was known as a participant in Correspondence chess tournaments. In 1990, he was awarded the International Correspondence Chess Federation (ICCF) International Master title and received the International Correspondence Chess Grandmaster title four year later.
