= Robin Smith (chess player) =

American chess player (1952–2009)

- Country: United States
- Born: August 17, 1952
- Died: May 1, 2009 (aged 56)
- Title: ICCF Grandmaster (2004)
- ICCF rating: 2642 (April 2008)

Robin Smith (August 17, 1952 – May 1, 2009) was an American chess player and writer. He held the ICCF title of Correspondence Chess Grandmaster (GM), was a two-time US Correspondence Chess Champion, and author of the book Modern Chess Analysis. His last and highest ICCF rating was 2642, which he achieved in only 64 games from 1997 to 2008.

== Books ==
- Smith, Robin (2004), Modern Chess Analysis, Gambit Publications, ISBN 1-904600-08-5
