= Redolfi =

Redolfi is an Italian surname. Notable people with the surname include:

- Alex Redolfi (born 1994), Italian football player
- Attilio Redolfi (1923–1997), Italian-French racing cyclist
- Rodolfo Redolfi (1928–2013), Argentine chess player
