= Dieter Mohrlok =

German chess player

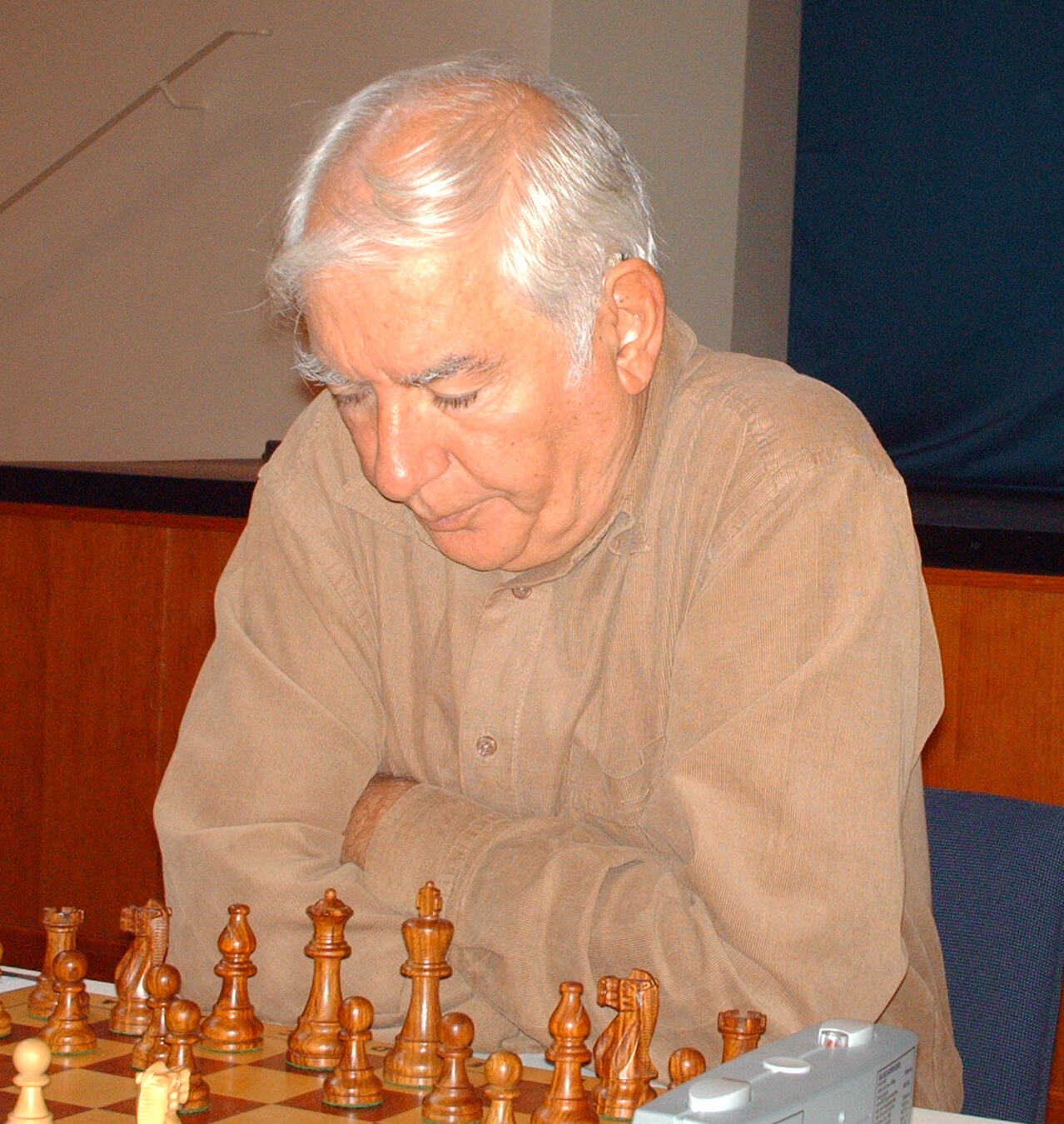
- Mohrlok in 2008

Personal information
- Full name: Dieter Alfred Mohrlok
- Born: 4 November 1938 Stuttgart, Germany
- Died: 2 March 2010 (aged 71) Stuttgart, Germany

Chess career
- Country: Germany
- Title: FIDE International Master (1969); ICCF Grandmaster (1999)
- Peak rating: 2450 (July 1971)
- ICCF peak rating: 2549 (April 2000)

Dieter Alfred Mohrlok (4 November 1938 — 2 March 2010) was a German chess player who held the chess titles of International Master (1969) and International Correspondence Chess Grandmaster (1999). He was a Chess Olympiad team bronze medal winner (1964).

== Biography ==
In 1956, Mohrlok won West German Youth Chess Championship. In 1958, he won Baden-Württemberg State Chess Championship. Between 1959 and 1976 he entered the final of the West German Chess Championship six times. In 1962 Dieter Mohrlok won the prestigious German Chess Cup Dähne-Pokal. He was the twice winner of the Chess Bundesliga: in 1968 with chess club Stuttgarter SF and in 1978 with chess club Königsspringer Frankfurt. In 1969, he was awarded the FIDE International Master (IM) title.

He played for West Germany in the Chess Olympiads:

- In 1962, at second reserve board in the 15th Chess Olympiad in Varna (+5, =4, -2),
- In 1964, at reserve board in the 16th Chess Olympiad in Tel Aviv (+2, =5, -2) and won team bronze medal,
- In 1970, at reserve board in the 19th Chess Olympiad in Siegen (+6, =5, -1),
- In 1976, at fourth board in the 22nd Chess Olympiad in Haifa (+4, =2, -2).

Mohrlok played for West Germany in the European Team Chess Championship:

- In 1977, at seventh board in the 6th European Team Chess Championship in Moscow (+2, =1, -2).

Also Mohrlok with West Germany team three times won the Clare Benedict Chess Cup (1962, 1963, 1964).

Since the mid-1950s, he actively participated in correspondence chess tournaments. He represented West Germany in 1st and 2nd European Team Correspondence Chess Championships. In 1992 Dieter Mohrlok won the European Individual Correspondence Chess Championship. In 1986, Dieter Mohrlok was awarded the International Correspondence Chess Master (IMC) title and received the International Correspondence Chess Grandmaster (GMC) title in 1999.
