= Terje Wibe =

Norwegian chess player (born 1947)

Personal information
- Full name: Terje Paul Wibe
- Born: 6 October 1947 (age 79)

Chess career
- Country: Norway
- Title: FIDE International Master (1977); ICCF Grandmaster (1993)
- FIDE rating: 2308 (September 2010)
- Peak rating: 2425 (January 1979)
- ICCF rating: 2531 (July 1998)
- ICCF peak rating: 2574 (July 1995)

Terje Paul Wibe (born 6 October 1947) is a Norwegian chess player. In over-the-board chess, he received the FIDE title of International Master (IM) in 1977. In correspondence chess, he earned the ICCF title of Grandmaster (GM) in 1993.

== Biography ==
In the 1970s, Wibe was one of the leading Norwegian chess players. He won the Norwegian Chess Championship in 1971.

He played for Norway in the Chess Olympiads:

- In 1966, at second reserve board in the 17th Chess Olympiad in Havana (+3, =3, -4),
- In 1968, at first reserve board in the 18th Chess Olympiad in Lugano (+8, =1, -5),
- In 1970, at fourth board in the 19th Chess Olympiad in Siegen (+4, =9, -2),
- In 1972, at second board in the 20th Chess Olympiad in Skopje (+6, =2, -6),
- In 1978, at first board in the 23rd Chess Olympiad in Buenos Aires (+0, =5, -6).

Wibe played for Norway in the World Student Team Chess Championships:

- In 1968, at fourth board in the 15th World Student Team Chess Championship in Ybbs (+5, =2, -4),
- In 1969, at fourth board in the 16th World Student Team Chess Championship in Dresden (+6, =4, -1).

He played for Norway in the Nordic Chess Cups:

- In 1970, at fifth board in the 1st Nordic Chess Cup in Großenbrode (+1, =1, -1) and won team bronze medal,
- In 1972, at first board in the 3rd Nordic Chess Cup in Großenbrode (+1, =1, -2),
- In 1973, at third board in the 4th Nordic Chess Cup in Ribe (+1, =1, -3) and won team bronze medal,
- In 1975, at third board in the 6th Nordic Chess Cup in Hindås (+4, =1, -0) and won individual gold medal,
- In 1977, at third board in the 8th Nordic Chess Cup in Glücksburg (+2, =1, -2),
- In 1983, at fourth board in the 9th Nordic Chess Cup in Oslo (+2, =2, -3),
- In 1987, at second board in the 11th Nordic Chess Cup in Słupsk (+0, =2, -2) and won team gold medal.

From 1977, Wibe actively participated in correspondence chess tournaments. He is a five-time winner of the Norwegian Correspondence Chess Championships: 1978, 1980, 1981, 1983, and 1990.
