= Maurice W. Johnson =

English correspondence chess grandmaster

Personal information
- Born: 18 July 1940 (age 85)

Chess career
- Country: England
- Title: ICCF Grandmaster (1995)
- ICCF rating: 2428 (April 2004)
- ICCF peak rating: 2618 (July 1998)

Maurice W. Johnson (born 18 July 1940) is a retired English chess player who hold the ICCF title of Grandmaster. He played chess from an early age, going on to compete in over-the-board tournaments in Southampton, England during the 1960s, becoming club champion in 1969.

By the 1980s, Johnson had moved into Correspondence Chess playing domestic and international tournaments, winning the British Correspondence Chess Association (BCCA) championship title as an outright winner for 3 consecutive years in 1989, 1990, and 1991, remaining the only player to do so since it started in 1906. This achievement saw him awarded the BCCA Millards Silver King Trophy but Johnson donated the trophy back to the British Correspondence Chess Association some time later, where it has since remained in storage.

Johnson achieved the IM norm (International Master) in 1994 and the GM norm (Grandmaster) in 1995, whilst playing the SSKK-Bulletinen 40 Years tournament and went on to play in the World Championship 3/4 Final in 1999, achieving a personal International Correspondence Chess Federation rating of 2618 in 1998.

During 1997 Johnson wrote the article "How I became a CC grandmaster" for the inaugural issue of the Correspondence Chess magazine Chess Mail.
