= Eva Možná-Hojdarová =

Czech chess player (born 1949)

Personal information
- Born: 30 October 1949 (age 76) Prague, Czechoslovakia

Chess career
- Country: Czechoslovakia; Czech Republic
- Title: ICCF Lady Grandmaster (1996); Woman FIDE Master (1986)
- FIDE rating: 1891 (October 2021)
- Peak rating: 2069 (April 2004)
- ICCF rating: 2165 (April 2003)
- ICCF peak rating: 2341 (July 1999)

Eva Možná-Hojdarová (née Hojdarová, also Možná; born 30 October 1949) is a Czech chess player who holds the chess titles of Lady International Correspondence Chess Grand Master (LGM, 1996) and Woman FIDE Master (WFM, 1986). She is a three-time Czechoslovak Women's Chess Championship medalist (1972, 1975, 1978).

== Biography ==
In the 1970s, Eva Možná-Hojdarová was one of the leading Czechoslovak women's chess players. She has won three bronze medals in the Czech women's chess championships (1972, 1975, 1978).

Eva Možná-Hojdarová played for Czechoslovakia in the Women's Chess Olympiad:

- In 1972, at first reserve board in the 5th Chess Olympiad (women) in Skopje (+2, =2, -1).

In later years, Eva Možná-Hojdarová active participated in correspondence chess tournaments. She won with Czech Republic team 4th Ladies Correspondence Chess Olympiad (1992–1997). In 1990, Eva Možná-Hojdarová was awarded the ICCF Lady International Correspondence Chess Grand Master (LGM) title and received the Lady International Correspondence Chess Grand Master (LGM) title six years later.
