= IFSB =

IFSB can mean any of the following:

- Internationaler Fernschachbund
- Islamic Financial Services Board (Malaysia)
- Independence Federal Savings Bank
- International Flying Saucer Bureau
- International Fitness Sanctioning Body
- International Financial Services Board of Malaysia
- Indoor Football Scouting Bureau
- International Foxhunters Stud Book
