= Dmitry Gooshchin =

Correspondence chess player

Personal information
- Native name: דמיטרי גושצ'ין
- Born: 15 January 1982 (age 44)

Chess career
- Country: Israel
- Title: Grandmaster

Dmitry Gooshchin (Hebrew: דמיטרי גושצ'ין; born 15 January 1982) is an Israeli Correspondence Chess Grandmaster and high-tech entrepreneur. He represents the Israeli national team in the World Correspondence Chess Championships, Euro Championships and Chess Olympiads.

== Education ==
Gooshchin completed his M.Sc. in Astrophysics, Geophysics, and Planetary science from Tel Aviv University, Israel.

== Career ==
Gooshchin, worked in senior management roles in fintech and high tech companies and was a founder in several companies including Fractom, Goodelta, and Strategy Runner (sold to MFGlobal). Along with Dr. Anna Becker, Gooshchin co-founded EndoTech, an algorithmic trading platform based on artificial intelligence and machine learning.

=== Scientific applications ===
Gooshchin holds patents in the area of antennas and wireless technologies. His approach to advanced communication structures is implemented in innovative antenna systems, radio navigation, and cellular communications modules globally. Technically, these antenna advancements and designs are rooted in the Fibonacci sequence, golden ratio, and fractal geometry.

=== Chess ===
Gooshchin holds the title of Correspondence Chess Grandmaster and is ranked in the top 100 globally and 1 in Israel (as of March 2026).

He won the Israel Correspondence Chess Championship in 2008, 2009, and 2011 and took 3rd place in 2007.

Gooshchin is also the winner of the 17th Correspondence Chess Olympiad (2008) on board 6 and the winner of the 7th Correspondence Chess European team championship (2011) on board 7.

He reached the semi-finals of the 34th and 41st World Correspondence Chess Championship and was the finalist in the 20th Correspondence Chess Olympiad on the 1st board.

He has been included in two encyclopedias for his history and chess accomplishments.
