= Peter Markland =

English chess player (born 1951)

Personal information
- Born: Peter Richard Markland; 13 April 1951 (age 75) Bolton, Lancashire, England

Chess career
- Country: England
- Title: ICCF Grandmaster (1984); FIDE Master (2021)
- FIDE rating: 2390 (May 1974)
- Peak rating: 2510 (July 1971)
- Peak ranking: No. 63 (July 1971)
- ICCF rating: 2418 (July 1992)

Peter Richard Markland (born 13 April 1951 in Bolton, Lancashire) is a British chess player. He was a member of the British team at the Chess Olympiads in 1972 and 1974. Markland was listed as the highest ranked British chess player in the first official FIDE Elo list, published in July 1971.

Since 1984, Markland is an ICCF Grandmaster. He is also an FIDE Master since 2021.

He worked as a banker and lives in Woodbridge, Suffolk.

== Bibliography ==
- The Best of Karpov (1975)
- The Sicilian Richter-Rauzer [with Tim Harding] (1975)
- Sicilian: ...E5 [with Tim Harding] (1976)
