= Jorge Aldrete Lobo =

Mexican chess player (1940–2020)

Personal information
- Born: 13 July 1940 Mexico City, Mexico
- Died: 1 July 2020 (aged 79)

Chess career
- Country: Mexico
- Title: International Master (2000); ICCF Grandmaster (2006)
- Peak rating: 2415 (January 1983)

Jorge Aldrete Lobo (13 July 1940 – 1 July 2020) was a Mexican chess International Master (IM) and International Correspondence Chess Grandmaster (2006).

== Biography ==
Jorge Aldrete Lobo learned to play chess at the age of 14. In 1955 he won the Mexican Youth Chess Championship. In 1957 in Toronto Jorge Aldrete Lobo participated in 4th World Junior Chess Championship and ranked in 8th place.

Jorge Aldrete Lobo played for Mexico in the Chess Olympiad:

- In 1964, at first board in the 16th Chess Olympiad in Tel Aviv (+6, =6, -6),
- In 1978, at fourth board in the 23rd Chess Olympiad in Buenos Aires (+5, =4, -2),
- In 1982, at first reserve board in the 25th Chess Olympiad in Lucerne (+6, =3, -3).

In later years, Jorge Aldrete Lobo active participated in correspondence chess tournaments. In 2006, he was awarded the International Correspondence Chess Grandmaster (GMC) title.

In the late 1970s, Jorge Aldrete Lobo led the Mexican Chess Federation (FENAMAC). By profession he was a chemical engineer.
