= Peter Clarke (chess player) =

English chess player (1933–2014)

Personal information
- Born: Peter Hugh Clarke; 18 March 1933 London, England
- Died: 11 December 2014 (aged 81) Cornwall, England

Chess career
- Country: England
- Title: ICCF Grandmaster (1980); FIDE Master (1984)
- FIDE rating: 2380 (July 1971)
- ICCF rating: 2361 (July 1992)

Peter Hugh Clarke (18 March 1933 – 11 December 2014) was an English chess player who held the titles of FIDE Master, International Correspondence Chess Grandmaster (1980), FIDE International Arbiter (1976) and Chess Olympiad individual silver medal winner (1956).

== Biography ==
Peter Hugh Clarke started playing chess at the age of six. He twice won the London Boys' Chess Championship (1950, 1951). He participated in the British Chess Championship multiple times, winning five silver medals.

From 1959, Clarke worked as a chess journalist for the newspaper The Sunday Times and for the magazine British Chess Magazine. He is known as a biographer of Mikhail Tal (1961) and Tigran Petrosian (1964). Thanks to his good knowledge of the Russian language, he translated a book about Vasily Smyslov in 1958. In 1963, he wrote the book 100 Soviet Chess Miniatures.

Clarke played for England in the Chess Olympiads:

- in 1954, at the second reserve board in the 11th Chess Olympiad in Amsterdam (+2, =2, -3),
- in 1956, at the reserve board in the 12th Chess Olympiad in Moscow (+7, =5, -0), winning an individual silver medal,
- in 1958, at the fourth board in the 13th Chess Olympiad in Munich (+2, =10, -3),
- in 1960, at the third board in the 14th Chess Olympiad in Leipzig (+4, =7, -3),
- in 1962, at the second board in the 15th Chess Olympiad in Varna (+3, =10, -2),
- in 1964, at the second board in the 16th Chess Olympiad in Tel Aviv (+2, =8, -2),
- in 1966, at the first board in the 17th Chess Olympiad in Havana (+2, =10, -1),
- in 1968, at the third board in the 18th Chess Olympiad in Lugano (+0, =7, -1).

He also played for England in the World Student Team Chess Championship (1954, 1959) and in the Clare Benedict Cup (1960–1961, 1963, 1965, 1967–1968) where he won a team silver medal (1960) and four bronze medals (1961, 1963, 1967, 1968).

In later years, Clarke actively participated in correspondence chess tournaments. In 1977, he won the British Correspondence Chess Championship. He was awarded the title of International Correspondence Chess Master (IMC) in 1976, and the International Correspondence Chess Grandmaster (GMC) title four years later.

== Literature ==
- Clarke, Peter Hugh, Mikhail Tal's Best Games of Chess, Bell, 1961, ISBN 9780713502046
- Clarke, Peter Hugh, Petrosian's Best Games of Chess 1946-1963, G. Bell & Sons, 1971, ISBN 9780713502060
