= Tunç Hamarat =

Turkish chess player (born 1946)

Personal information
- Born: December 1, 1946 (age 79) Istanbul, Turkey

Chess career
- Country: Austria
- Title: ICCF Grandmaster (1997)
- ICCF World Champion: 1999–2004
- ICCF rating: 2502 {October 2021)
- ICCF peak rating: 2658 (October 2002)

Tunç Hamarat (born December 1, 1946) is a Turkish chess player living in Austria and the sixteenth ICCF World Champion, 1999–2004.

Born in Istanbul, Hamarat attended the Austrian St. Georgs-Kolleg high school in Istanbul, and then graduated in Physics from the Middle East Technical University (ODTÜ) in Ankara. In 1972, he moved to Vienna, Austria for his Master's degree in Physics Engineering at the Vienna University of Technology there. In 1976, he went temporarily back to İzmir, Turkey for military service. Since 1972 he has been living in Austria and has been an Austrian citizen since 1994. Recently, he is working for a telecommunication company in Vienna.

During the sixteenth ICCF World Championship, he had amassed an unassailable 11 points out of 15 games with one game remaining. Hamarat was deadly on the black side of the Sicilian Sveshnikov, beating former CC World Champion Horst Rittner of Germany and Greek International Master Spyros Kofidis with it. At one time, Hamarat was supposed not to have lost a single game as White in over 40 years. However, this retroactively ceased to be the case, as correspondence chess games date from their year of initiation, and Hamarat eventually lost games playing with the white pieces against Edgar Prang (started in 2001) and Hans Marcus Elwert (started in 2002), though he apparently resigned these only after he became World Champion in January 2004. In 'over-the-board' chess, he played in the finals of the Turkish championships three times. In Vienna, he played in the top league. But since 1963 his main interest has been correspondence chess, "because I am a perfectionist", he says. In 1997, he earned the title of International Grandmaster of Correspondence Chess.

Hamarat also plays backgammon professionally. He is one of the top players in Austria. He won several titles in international backgammon tournaments. Besides, he is also an expert in jazz music, and acts as a jazz DJ in Vienna.

The Austrian mail authority issued a personified postage stamp with his picture in his honor. The Wiener Zeitung, an important newspaper, named him as the 'Viennese of the month'.

| Preceded by (Netherlands) Gert Jan Timmerman | World Correspondence Chess Champion; 1999–2004 | Succeeded by (Norway) Ivar Bern |
