= Robert K. von Weizsäcker =

German economist

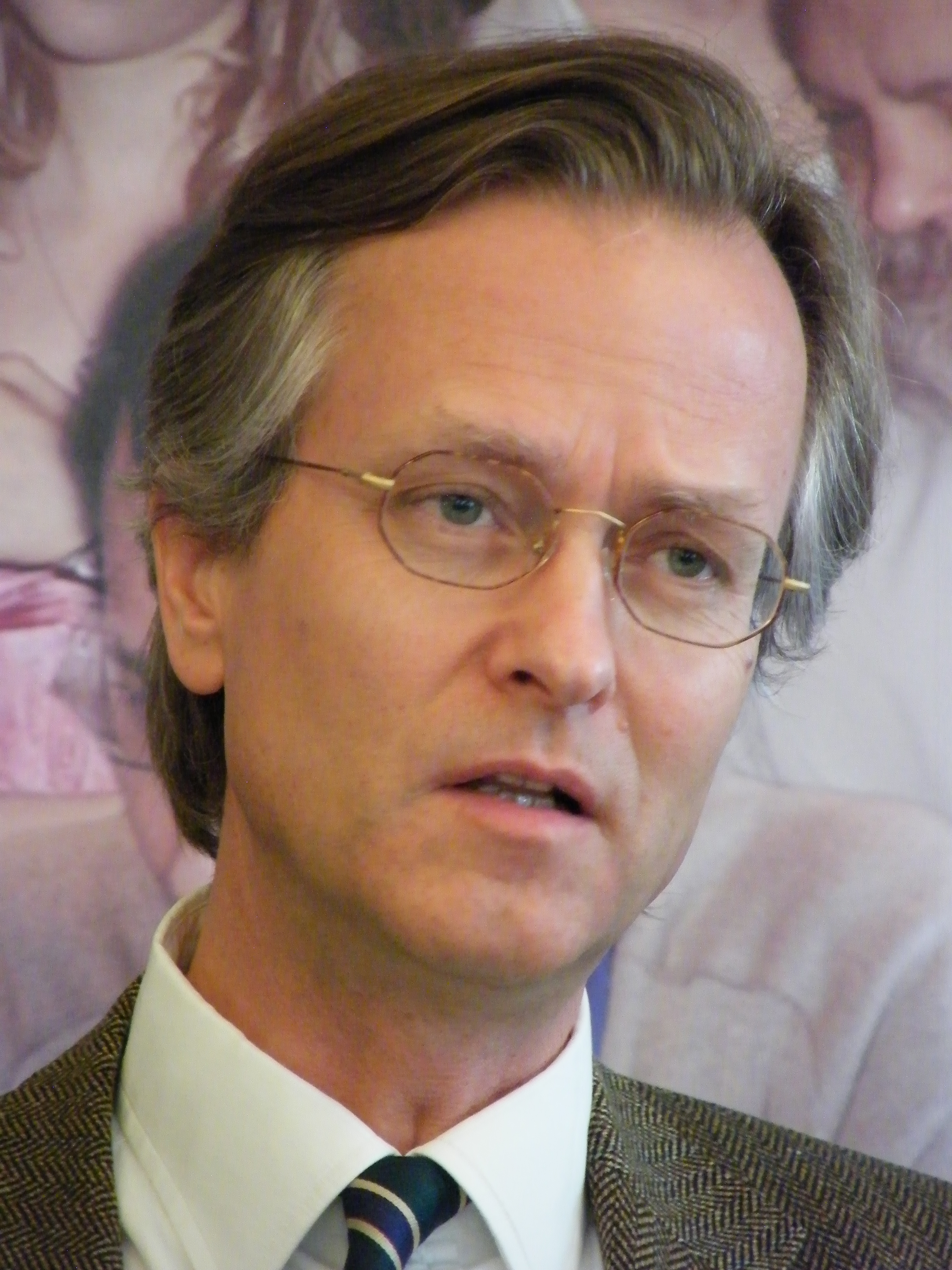
- Von Weizsäcker in 2010
- Born: Robert Klaus Freiherr von Weizsäcker; 6 December 1954 (age 71); Essen, West Germany

Academic background
- Education: University of Bonn

Robert Klaus Freiherr von Weizsäcker (born 6 December 1954) is a German economist, Correspondence Chess Grandmaster, and Honorary President of the German Chess Federation. He has held the Chair of Economics, Public Finance and Industrial Organization at Technical University of Munich. He is the eldest son of the late former German President Richard von Weizsäcker (1920–2015).

== Biography ==
Robert K. von Weizsäcker studied mathematics and economics at the University of Bonn, received a PhD at the London School of Economics / University of Bonn in 1985, and attained the Habilitation at the University of Bonn in 1990.

From 2003 to 2020, he has been full professor of economics, public finance and industrial organization, and since 2020 he is Emeritus of Excellence at Technical University of Munich. Previously he had research and teaching positions at the University of Bonn, the Humboldt-University of Berlin, the University of Halle-Wittenberg, and the University of Mannheim. He was a visiting scholar at Cambridge University, Université Catholique de Louvain, London School of Economics, Stanford University, Oxford University, and the International Monetary Fund in Washington D.C.

Robert von Weizsäcker is research fellow of the Centre for Economic Policy Research in London, the Ifo Institute for Economic Research in Munich, and the Institute for the Study of Labor in Bonn. He was a Heisenberg Fellow of the German National Science Foundation and a member of the German Scientific Council.

In addition he held positions as faculty member of the Munich Intellectual Property Law Center at the Max Planck Institute for Intellectual Property, Competition and Tax Law, as member of the managing board of the Institute for Mittelstand-Research in Mannheim, and as board member of the Carl von Linde Academy in Munich.

He has published numerous books and articles, particularly in the fields of public economics (public debt, tax reform, and social security financing), microeconomics (income and wealth distribution, decision theory), population economics, and the economics of education.

== Other ==
Robert von Weizsäcker is an International Correspondence Chess Grandmaster and member of the German national correspondence chess team. In the Correspondence Chess Olympiad in 2008, he won both the team and the individual gold medal. He was a team vice world champion in 2015 and 2021, as well as a team world champion in 2023. From 2007 to 2011 he has been president, and since 2011 he is Honorary President of the German Chess Federation.

Robert von Weizsäcker holds an international Amateur Radio license with the call sign DL1BOB.
