= Martin Kreuzer =

German mathematician and chess player (born 1962)

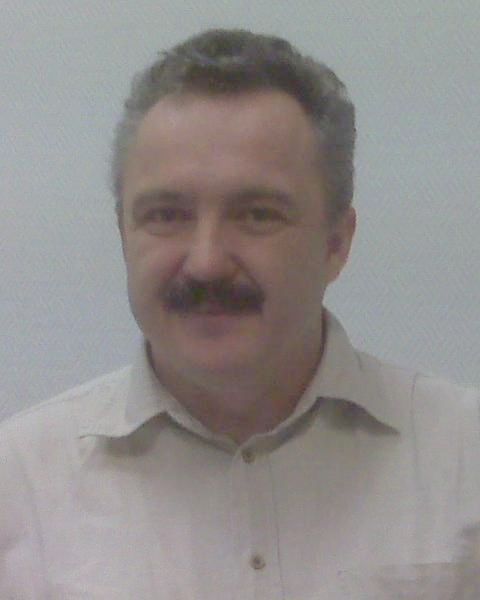
- Kreuzer in 2010

Personal information
- Born: 15 July 1962 (age 64) Ihrlerstein, Germany

Chess career
- Country: Germany
- Title: ICCF Grandmaster (1993); FIDE Master (1993)
- FIDE rating: 2265 (October 2021)
- Peak rating: 2344 (February 2014)
- ICCF rating: 2606 (October 2019)
- ICCF peak rating: 2660 (July 1992)

Martin Kreuzer (born 15 July 1962 in Ihrlerstein) is a German mathematics professor and chess player who holds the chess titles of International Correspondence Chess Grandmaster and FIDE Master.

Kreuzer did his graduate studies in mathematics at the University of Regensburg, located on the Danube River in Bavaria. After spending one year in the United States as a foreign exchange student at Brandeis University in Boston, he finished his diploma in Mathematics in Regensburg in 1986. He received his doctorate of natural sciences with dissertation Vektorbündel und der Satz von Cayley-Bacharach from University of Regensburg in 1989, working under advisor Ernst Kunz. Next came a post-doctoral fellowship at Queen's University in Kingston, Ontario, Canada, from 1989 to 1991, working in algebraic geometry with Professor Anthony Geramita. He then returned to Germany, worked as a scientific assistant at the University of Regensburg and gained his habilitation in Mathematics in 1997. After substituting for the chair of algebraic geometry at the University of Bayreuth in 2000–2001 and for the chair of algebra at Technical University of Dortmund from 2002 to 2007, he moved to Passau where he holds the chair of symbolic computation at the University of Passau. His main research interests are computer algebra, cryptography, computational commutative algebra, algebraic geometry, and their industrial applications.

Kreuzer's chess skills have earned him the FIDE Master title for over-the-board play. During his short stay in Canada, he finished fourth at the 1990 Open Canadian Chess Championship at Edmundston. Further notable over-the-board results include the prize for the best player without Elo number in the Elo rating system at the 1987 Open "Chess for Peace" in London and a fourth place at the first Novotel Open in Genova, Italy in 1997.

He gained the title of International Correspondence Chess Grandmaster (GMC) 1994, from his result in the 1988–95 Von Massow Memorial tournament. Kreuzer played board six in the finals, on the German team which shared the gold medal at the 11th Correspondence Chess Olympiad, 1992–1999. He was a member the German team which won the 12th Correspondence Chess Olympiad, 1998–2004, and a member of the German team which won the 13th Correspondence Chess Olympiad, 2004–2009.

A selection of his games can be found at chessbase.com.

== Writings ==
- Computational Commutative Algebra I, by Martin Kreuzer and Lorenzo Robbiano, Heidelberg, Springer-Verlag 2000, ISBN 978-3-540-67733-8.
- Computational Commutative Algebra II, by Martin Kreuzer and Lorenzo Robbiano, Heidelberg, Springer-Verlag 2005, ISBN 978-3-540-25527-7.
