= Simon Webb (chess player) =

British chess player

Personal information
- Born: 10 June 1949 London, England
- Died: 14 March 2005 (aged 55) Sweden

Chess career
- Country: England; Sweden
- Title: ICCF Grandmaster (1983); FIDE International Master (1977)
- FIDE rating: 2420 (January 1992)
- Peak rating: 2445 (January 1978)
- ICCF rating: 2609 (April 2005)
- ICCF peak rating: 2665 (October 2001)

Simon Webb (10 June 1949 – 14 March 2005) was a British chess player and writer who held the chess titles of International Master and Correspondence Chess Grandmaster.

Born in London, he was joint British under-18 champion in 1966, and fourth in the European Junior Championship in 1969. Webb was briefly a professional player in the late 1970s, participated in a number of strong tournaments, and met some strong players, including a 17-year-old Garry Kasparov at the 1980 European Team Championship (Webb lost). At one event, he was assigned a lady translator. Webb married her and took her to England. He was joint second in the 1975 British Championship behind William Hartston. Perhaps his best tournament result was joint first with Liuben Spassov at Hamburg 1977, ahead of István Csom and Milan Matulović. He was famous for his ability to save or even win from hopelessly lost positions, which earned him the nickname "Houdini". He became an International Master in 1977. His final FIDE Elo rating was 2420.

Webb took up correspondence chess in the early 1980s, and all but gave up over-the-board play for a long time. He gained the International Correspondence Chess Grandmaster title in 1983 and scored a number of impressive results. In the 14th World Correspondence Chess Championship, won by Tõnu Õim, Webb finished fifth of the 15 participants with 8.5/14. His final ICCF Elo rating was 2609.

Webb was perhaps best known for his humorous book on practical tournament play, Chess for Tigers (Oxford University Press, 1978, ISBN 0-19-217575-0). As well as his chess achievements, he also represented England at bridge, partnered by his brother Roger.

In the 1980s, Webb moved to Sweden. Since the late 1990s, he played in the Swedish team championship.

On 14 March 2005, he was fatally stabbed in the family hallway by his 25-year-old son, Dennis. Dennis subsequently drove into a wall at some 130 km/hour but survived with a broken nose.
