= Ivar Bern =

Norwegian chess player

Personal information
- Born: 20 January 1967 (age 59) Norway

Chess career
- Country: Norway
- Title: FIDE International Master (1990); ICCF Grandmaster (1996)
- ICCF World Champion: 2002–2007
- FIDE rating: 2312 (December 2021)
- Peak rating: 2405 (July 1991)
- ICCF rating: 2667 (January 2011)
- ICCF peak rating: 2667 (July 2010)

Ivar Bern (born 20 January 1967) is a Norwegian chess player, most famous for being the seventeenth World Correspondence Chess Champion, 2002–2007. In over-the-board chess he received the FIDE title of International Master (IM) in 1990. In correspondence chess he earned the ICCF titles of International Master (IM) in 1994 and Grandmaster (GM) in 1996.

== Biography ==
Bern joined the Norwegian correspondence chess federation in 1986 and won the Norwegian correspondence chess championship in 1988.

Qualification to the World Championship started with scoring 10½/16 giving him a third-place finish in a World championship semifinal lasting between 1989 and 1995. This qualified him for a spot in the 3/4 final, or candidate tournament where Bern finished fourth, again scoring 10½/16, giving him one of the last spots in the World championship. The World Championship started in March 2002 and is as of January 2006 still ongoing, but on 7 January it became clear that none of the other contestants could overtake Bern any longer. Bern has completed all his games, scoring 10½/16 in this tournament as well. Two other players have the same number of points as he does, but Bern has better tiebreak scores. The slowness of conventional postcards in the seventeenth championship led to the winner of the eighteenth World Championship, Joop van Oosterom being announced before Bern's victory in the seventeenth.] Another performance was the second place in the 7th World Cup Final (started in 1994 and finished in 2001).

In over-the-board chess Bern has won the Open Norwegian Championships three times, in 1986, 1989 and 1990. His best results in the more prestigious closed Norwegian Championship are third-place finishes in 1989 and 1990. He gained the title of International Master in 1992. Bern plays for the Bergen Chess Club, and has participated on the teams which won the Norwegian Team Championships in 1994, 1997, 1998, 2000 and 2003. Bern is the chess columnist for Bergens Tidende.

Apart from chess, Bern's occupation is as a psychologist in school administration. Bern has also been active as guitarist in the music rock groups The Swamp Babies and Syv.

Preceded by (Turkey) Tunç Hamarat	World Correspondence Chess Champion; 2002–2003	Succeeded by (Netherlands) Joop van Oosterom
