= ICCF national member federations =

The International Correspondence Chess Federation national member federations number 56 nations, divided into four geographical zones:

- Zone 1: Europe (35 countries)
- World Zone (16 countries)
- Zone 4: Africa/Asia (5 countries)

== Zone 1: Europe ==
Zonal Director: Andrey Pavlikov (RUS)

== World Zone ==
Zonal Director: Jason Bokar (USA)

ICCF Member Countries	Name of Federation	National Delegate	Short History
Argentina	Liga Argentina de Ajedrez por Correspondencia (LADAC)	Juan Alberto Martello	https://www.iccf.com/country?country=ARG
Aruba	Aruba Correspondence Chess Federation	Valentino Martis	https://www.iccf.com/country?country=ARU
Austria	Austrian Chess Federation	Tunç Hamarat	https://www.iccf.com/country?country=AUT
Belgium	Belgian Correspondence Chess Association	Paul Clement	https://www.iccf.com/country?country=BEL
Brazil	Clube de Xadrez Epistolar Brasileiro (CXEB)	Bianor de Oliveira Neves	https://www.iccf.com/country?country=BRA
Canada	Canadian Correspondence Chess Association	Ralph P. Marconi	https://www.iccf.com/country?country=CAN
Chile	Liga Chilena de Ajedrez Postal (LICHAP)	Guillermo F. Toro Solís de Ovando	https://www.iccf.com/country?country=CHI
Cuba	Federación Cubana de Ajedrez Postal (FECAP)	Pablo Salcedo Mederos	https://www.iccf.com/country?country=CUB
Ecuador	Liga Ecuatoriana de Ajedrez Postal (LIECAP)	Pavao Bjazevic	https://www.iccf.com/country?country=ECU
Guatemala	Liga Guatemalteca de Ajedrez Postal (LIGUAP)	César Augusto Blanco Gramajo	https://www.iccf.com/country?country=GUA
Hong Kong	Hong Kong Federation / Correspondence Chess Section	Hin Sing Henry Leung	https://www.iccf.com/country?country=HKG
Japan	Japan Postal Chess Association (JPCA)	Hirokaz Onoda	https://www.iccf.com/country?country=JAP
New Zealand	New Zealand Correspondence Chess Association (NZCCA)	Michael Roy Freeman	https://www.iccf.com/country?country=NZL
Nicaragua	Liga Nicaragüense de Ajedrez Postal (LINICAP)	Guy José Bendaña Guerrero	https://www.iccf.com/country?country=NIC
Panama	Liga Panameña de Ajedrez por Correspondencia (LIPAC)	Hermann V. Rösch M.	https://www.iccf.com/country?country=PAN
Peru	Liga Peruana de Ajedrez a Distancia (LIPEAD)	Gino Figlio	https://www.iccf.com/country?country=PER
Turkey	Turkish Correspondence Chess Organization	Aziz Serhat Kural	https://www.iccf.com/country?country=TUR
USA	International Correspondence Chess Federation - USA (ICCF-USA)	Jason Bokar	https://www.iccf.com/country?country=USA
Venezuela (suspended)	Liga Venezolana de Ajedrez Postal (LIVEAP)	César Jesús Reyes Maldonado	https://www.iccf.com/country?country=VEN

== Zone 4: Africa/Asia ==
Zonal Director: Everdinand Knol (RSA)

Member Countries	Name of Federation	National Delegate	Short History
Australia	Correspondence Chess League of Australia (CCLA)	Garvin Gray	https://www.iccf.com/country?country=AUS
Cape Verde	Associacao Cabo-verdiana de Xadrez por Correspondencia (ACXC)	Francisco Carapinha	https://www.iccf.com/country?country=CPV
India	All India Correspondence Chess Federation (AICCF)	Alok Saxena	https://www.iccf.com/country?country=IND
Indonesia	Persatuan Catur Korespondensi Indonesia (PERCAKI)	Yosua Sitorus	https://www.iccf.com/country?country=INA
South Africa	South African Correspondence Chess Association (SACCA)	Everdinand Knol	https://www.iccf.com/country?country=RSA
