= Correspondence chess =

Game of chess via postal system or e-mail

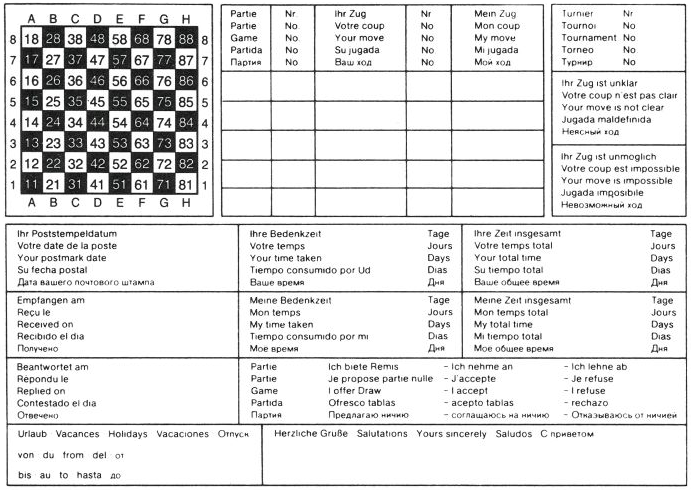
Postcard for international correspondence chess

Correspondence chess is chess played by various forms of long-distance correspondence, traditionally through the postal system. Today it is usually played through a correspondence chess server, a public internet chess forum, or email. Less common methods that have been employed include fax, homing pigeon and phone. It is in contrast to over-the-board (OTB) chess, where the players sit at a physical chessboard at the same time; and most online chess, where the players play each other in real time over the internet. However, correspondence chess can also be played online.

Correspondence chess allows people or clubs who are geographically distant to play one another without meeting in person. The length of a game played by correspondence can vary depending on the method used to transmit moves: a game played via a server or by email might last no more than a few days, weeks, or months; a game played by post between players in different countries might last several years.

== Structure ==
Correspondence chess differs from over-the-board (OTB) play in several respects. While players in OTB chess generally play one game at a time (an exception being a simultaneous exhibition), correspondence players often have several games going at once. Tournament games are played concurrently, (Note: Usually in daily chess tournaments, players play two games simultaneously: one as white and one as black.) and some players may have more than one hundred games continuing at the same time.

Time limit in correspondence game is not rigidly defined, but it is generally accepted that, on average, it is never less than one day per move (not counting transmission time in postal chess). This time allows for far deeper calculation, meaning that blunders can be less frequent. A high-level correspondence game can last over a year.

Certain forms of assistance, including books and chess databases, are often allowed; organizations vary as to whether chess engine use is permitted.

== Computer assistance ==
Computer assistance has altered correspondence chess. The decline in the popularity of traditional postal correspondence chess occurred at the end of the 20th century. This is also when chess programs became widely accessible, and their playing strength soon reached the level of grandmasters. Due to correspondence chess being played remotely, it is difficult to verify or regulate engine usage, which has led some organizations to simply allow it instead. This is in contrast to over-the-board chess competitions, where all chess organizations strictly prohibit the use of any electronic devices.

The International Correspondence Chess Federation (ICCF), the only correspondence chess organization affiliated with FIDE, the international chess organization, allows for collaboration between humans and computers, even during the World Correspondence Chess Championship. It also allows the use of reference materials that provide the best move in a given position, such as endgame tablebases. The ICCF calls this a "hybrid competition that involves the strategy and planning of humans guided by the accuracy of machines". Due to the accuracy and defensive abilities of modern engines, the draw rate of correspondence games is very high compared to over-the-board chess games.

In contrast, Chess.com's Daily Chess strictly prohibits the use of chess engines and all winners' games are subject to computer analysis for fair play. A similar stance is taken by the United States Chess Federation, which also explicitly prohibits the use of "chess playing algorithms" for evaluating games.

Variant games are often played on public chess servers or chess forums. Since the games are a modified form, chess engines may be less helpful, or based on the variant, completely useless. For example, chess games played on an unbounded chessboard, or infinite chess, are virtually untouched by chess-playing software.

== Regulatory bodies ==
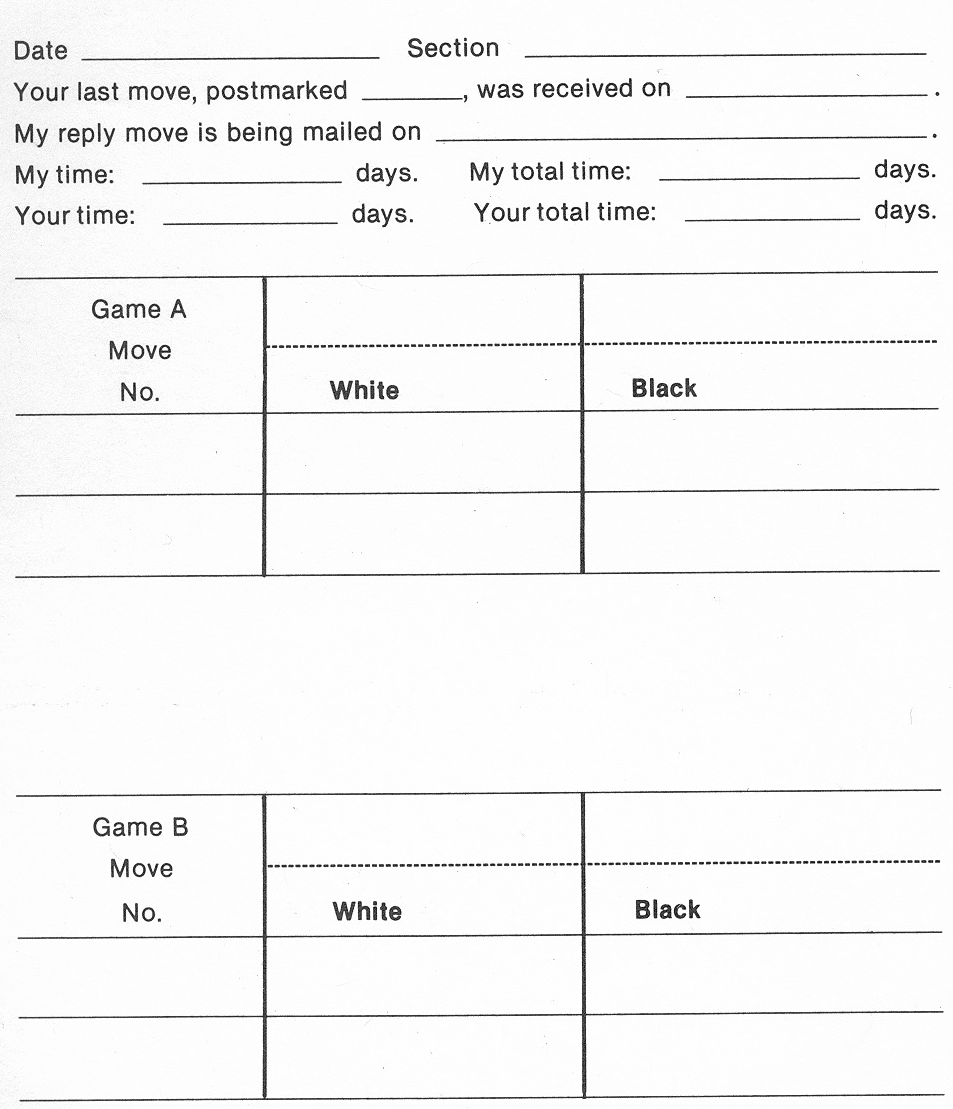
Postcard used by the US Chess Federation

Correspondence chess tournaments are usually played under the auspices of an official regulatory body, most importantly the International Correspondence Chess Federation. The ICCF, which organizes postal and email events, is not the only organization involved in correspondence chess. There are numerous national and regional bodies for postal chess, as well as a number of organisations devoted to organizing email play for free, such as the International Email Chess Group (IECG), Lechenicher SchachServer (LSS), the Free Internet Correspondence Games Server (FICGS) (which also runs a world championship cycle), and International E-mail Chess Club (IECC). However, groups other than the ICCF are not sanctioned by FIDE.

The ICCF awards the titles International Master, Senior International Master and International Correspondence Chess Grandmaster—these are equivalent to similar titles awarded by FIDE for over-the-board chess. The ICCF also runs the World Correspondence Chess Championships. Because these events can last a long time, they may overlap: for instance, in February 2005 Joop van Oosterom was declared winner of the eighteenth Championship (which began in June 2003), though the winner of the seventeenth Championship (which began in March 2002) had not yet been determined.

Up until 2004, ICCF correspondence chess was played only via email and postal mail. For playing by these two forms of transmission, the ICCF sanctioned the use of ICCF numeric notation, sometimes known as Koch notation. However, if players agreed to use a mutually agreeable notation system, this was accepted.

In recent years, the use of increasingly powerful chess programs has brought forth new challenges for organizations like the ICCF and the U.S. Chess Federation, necessitating sometimes controversial decisions on the admissibility of such programs in official correspondence play.

Moreover, the emergence of the Internet has brought new opportunities for correspondence chess, not all of which are organized by official bodies. Casual correspondence chess includes correspondence play initiated through correspondence chess servers and games played between individuals who meet and play on their own. Casual correspondence play does not lead to official ratings, though some chess servers will calculate ratings for the players based on results on that server.

== Types ==
Correspondence chess has evolved into various forms, with server-based correspondence chess emerging as the most widespread in the contemporary world. Notably, major correspondence servers have grown in size and popularity, reaching the same prominence as online blitz chess servers. The landscape of chess has further expanded with the surge in popularity of daily chess, particularly in the second decade of the 21st century. This growth is evident in the annual influx of thousands of new players. The heightened interest in daily chess is underscored by the participation in the Daily Chess Championships organized since 2018. While the first edition had just over 7,000 players, in 2023, due to the significant interest in the event, the organizer had to limit the number of participants to 35,000.

=== Daily chess ===
Daily chess represents the adaptation of traditional correspondence chess to the digital realm of the Internet. The term daily chess has become commonplace, thanks to the multitude of tournaments hosted by the Chess.com platform. It is often characterized as a fusion of online chess and correspondence chess; the immediacy and real-time interaction reminiscent of online chess are combined with the more contemplative pace and turn-based structure found in traditional correspondence chess. This amalgamation allows players to engage in matches with opponents from around the world without the pressure of immediate time constraints. In its fundamental form, daily chess requires players to complete each move within a strict 24-hour timeframe, as implied by its name.

=== Server-based ===
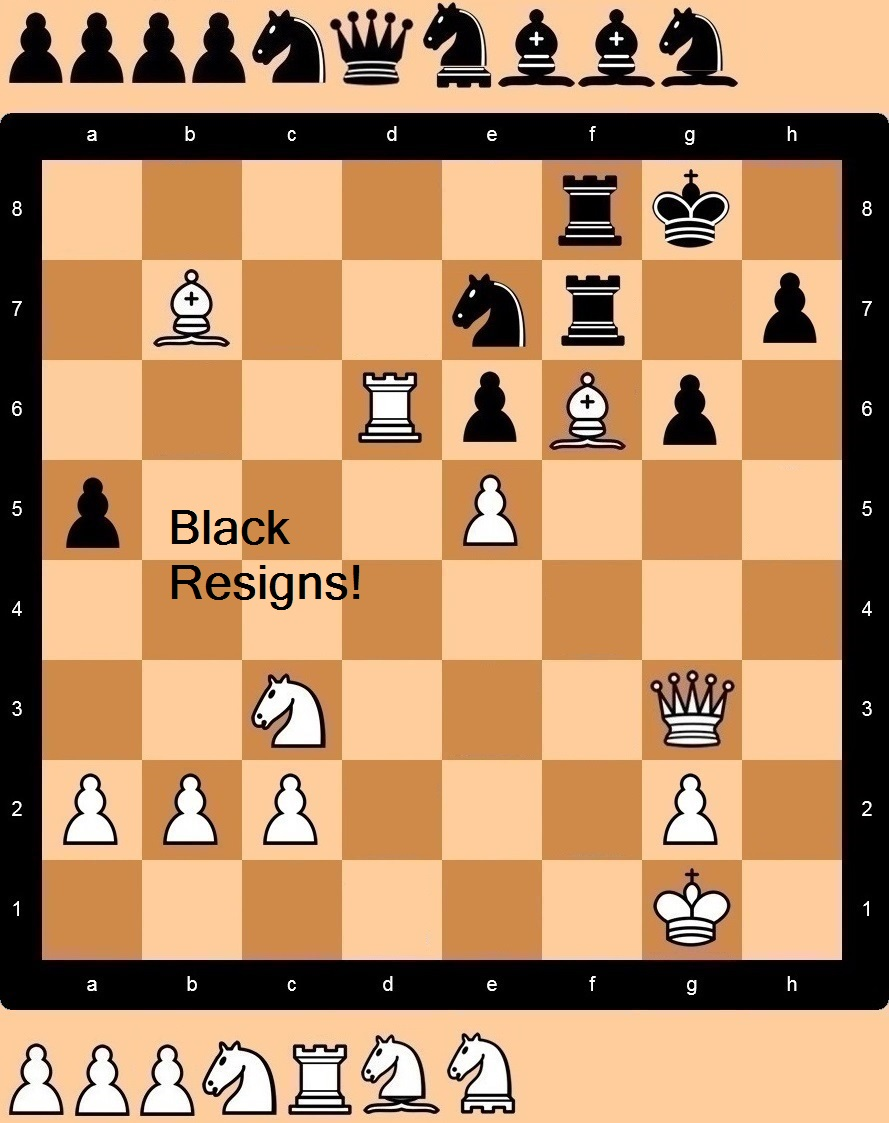
Sample image of a chess variant that can be played on the internet.

Correspondence chess servers are usually database-driven and carry with them a web-based interface for submitting moves to the database. However, the method of transmission does not matter, as long as the transmitted moves are audited within the server's database.

Server fees vary; most casual servers use a yearly charging model, whereby players can play as many tournaments or games as they want all year round. Some servers offer basic membership for free, with more services available for a fee. Casual servers also tend to have a wide range of features, such as real-time rating systems, online games databases, social and chess improvement forums, teams, and player homepages. More traditional correspondence chess servers often charge per tournament and force the use of real names. For example, competitors in the Correspondence Chess League of America use their real names rather than aliases.

The vast majority of chess platforms that enable playing chess also provide access to server-based correspondence / daily chess. However, not all of them allow switching to the analysis mode or offer a built-in library of openings or entire games.

=== Mobile ===
With the advent of smartphones such as Apple's iPhone, Blackberry, and Android-based devices, correspondence chess has seen a recent rise in popularity as applications on these devices, where users submit their moves to a central server. Smartphone users may also participate in Casual Correspondence Chess Matches by exchanging Algebraic Notation Moves Lists by Text Message, which can be quickly imported by Mobile & Web-based Chess Software into a virtual Chessboard depicting each move of the Match.

These Correspondence Chess Matches can also turn into Over-the Board Virtual Matches by the use of Video Calling Apps such as FaceTime which enable Screen Sharing in Real-Time.

=== Email-based ===
There are organizations devoted to organizing play by email, such as the International E-mail Chess Club (IECC).

Email play has gradually declined in popularity due to issues such as email viruses, opponents' claims of not receiving moves, and similar impediments. Email play has arguably been superseded by server-based correspondence chess, where usually the interface to a chess server is a web-based interface.

=== Postal (traditional mail) ===
There are national and regional organizations for postal chess which use traditional "snail mail" for transmitting moves between players. The ICCF and affiliated local and national federations often organize postal events. Other examples of groups offering postal play include the Correspondence Chess League of America (CCLA) and the United States Chess Federation (USCF).

Traditional postal chess organizations such as the International Correspondence Chess Federation, the Correspondence Chess League of America (CCLA), and the United States Chess Federation (USCF) have added email and/or server-based options to their correspondence play.

One of the older documented postal correspondence chess games is a game played in 1804 by lieutenant-colonel F.W. von Mauvillon of the Dutch army in The Hague with one of his officers in Breda. Actor Humphrey Bogart, a strong player (Class A to Expert) also played games of correspondence chess against American G.I.s through mail, at one point having his mail intercepted by the FBI due to fears the algebraic notation used in chess games was actually an encrypted message.

Postal correspondence chess has mostly been superseded by server-based correspondence chess.

== Time control ==
In the past, games exchanged through mailed envelopes with stamps could take months or even years. The normal time limit for International Correspondence Chess Federation games is 30 to 60 days for every 10 moves (not counting shipping time for postal chess).

In server-based correspondence chess most games are played at a pace of one move per day or several days. The most popular variants include:

- One move per day. The most common form of daily chess. This means that when a move is made by the first player, the clock for their opponent starts. They then have exactly 24 hours to respond. Being late means losing. In practice, this often means having to make a minimum of 2 moves per day. For example, if one decides to make moves only in the evening, the opponent might respond immediately. Then, trying to make the next move at a similar time the next day may result in being late and losing on time. Therefore, a common practice is to make moves in all ongoing games in the morning and then in the evening.
- One move every 3 days. The second most popular option. This is the optimal time for people with limited time resources. It is enough to make all moves once a day at any time to be sure not to lose on time. Additionally, games can also be played every two days.
- One move every 7 days. It is not very popular due to the very long duration of the games.
- One move every 14 days. It is the longest daily time control offered by most sites.
- Variants with a time reserve are also encountered. This means that a player has additional time, and can use these additional days if they exceed their base time. Alternatively, a player may have a specified number of days for a specified number of moves.

== Over-the-board players who also play correspondence chess ==
Although nowadays the strongest correspondence players are specialists, a number of notable players in over-the-board (OTB) chess have in the past played postal games during their chess career.

	World OTB Champion	OTB Grandmaster	OTB International Master	OTB FIDE Master
World Correspondence Champion	Olga Rubtsova (Women's Champion)	Alberic O'Kelly de Galway; Viacheslav Ragozin	Hans Berliner; Yakov Estrin; C.J.S. Purdy; Mikhail Umansky; Ivar Bern	Gert Jan Timmerman
Correspondence Grandmaster		Ulf Andersson; Igor Bondarevsky; Aivars Gipslis; Curt Hansen; Jonny Hector; Jānis Klovāns; Jonathan Penrose; Olita Rause; Lothar Schmid; Duncan Suttles; Rafael Leitão	Janos Balogh; Olaf Barda; Jean Hébert; Richard Polaczek; Nikolai Papenin; Roman Chytilek; Bela Toth	Martin Kreuzer; Peter Hertel; Auvo Kujala; Dufek Jiří;
Correspondence International Master		Alexander Tolush		

Paul Keres, an Estonian sometimes regarded as the strongest player to never become world champion, played many games of correspondence chess. OTB world champions Alexander Alekhine and Max Euwe also played. Ulf Andersson also achieved very high ratings in both ICCF and FIDE, remaining in the FIDE top 100 until June 2002 and consistently ranking second on ICCF. Andrei Sokolov is another OTB GM who took up email chess. World Correspondence Champion Hans Berliner was also an OTB International Master.

In 1999, Garry Kasparov played a chess game "Kasparov versus the World" over the Internet, hosted by the MSN Gaming Zone. The "World Team" included participation of over 50,000 people from more than 75 countries, deciding their moves by plurality vote. The game lasted four months, with Kasparov playing "g7" on his 62nd move and announcing a forced checkmate in 28 moves. The World Team voters resigned on October 22. After the game Kasparov said "It is the greatest game in the history of chess. The sheer number of ideas, the complexity, and the contribution it has made to chess make it the most important game ever played."

== See also ==
- Correspondence Chess Olympiad
- ICCF national member federations
- International Correspondence Chess Grandmaster
- Internet chess servers
- Kasparov versus the World – a game played in 1999 between Garry Kasparov and over 50,000 participants from over 75 countries
- World Correspondence Chess Championship
- Online chess
