= International Correspondence Chess Federation =

- International Correspondence Chess Federation
- Abbreviation: ICCF
- Formation: 26 March 1951; 75 years ago
- Type: International organization
- Headquarters: Tannenbuel 12, CH-9230 Flawil, Switzerland
- President: Éric Ruch
- General Secretary: Michael Millstone
- Rules Director: Dennis M. Doren
- World Tournament Director: Uwe Staroske
- Affiliations: 53 member federations, along with FIDE
- Website: www.iccf.com
- Formerly called: IFSB (Internationaler Fernschachbund, 1928-1939), ICCA (International Correspondence Chess Association, 1945-1951)

The International Correspondence Chess Federation (ICCF) is an international correspondence chess organization. It was founded on 26 March 1951 as a new appearance of the International Correspondence Chess Association (ICCA), which was founded in 1945, as successor of the Internationaler Fernschachbund (IFSB), founded on 2 December 1928.

The current president is Éric Ruch, while the first president was Jean-Louis Ormond.

== History ==
=== Before ICCF ===
Some sources say that correspondence chess was already played in the 12th century. Most chess historians doubt whether this is true. In the 19th century chess clubs and magazines started to organize more regular tournaments, national as well as international tournaments. Finally in 1928 the first international league (Internationaler Fernschachbund) was founded. Alexander Alekhine, Paul Keres and Max Euwe were well-known enthusiastic correspondence chess players during some periods of their chess careers.

=== ICSB ===
On 15 August 1928, the ICSB (Internationaler Correspondensschachbund/International Correspondence Chess Federation) was created under the leadership of Erich Otto Freienhagen (Berlin), which had existed in a loose form since November 1927. Other members of the management were J.Keemink (Netherlands), K.Laue, H. von Massow, H.Schild (Germany) and C.Olsen (Norway). This was the first successful attempt to create an international correspondence chess federation. It survived for only a short period, but its successor proved to be viable and successful.

=== IFSB ===
On 2 December 1928, a new federation was formed in Berlin. To distinguish it from its predecessor, it was named the IFSB (Internationaler Fernschachbund). The founders were: R.Dührssen (President), J.Keemink (vice-president), H. von Massow (Secretary), K.Laue (Teasurer) and L.Probst (Managing Editor).

Freienhagen (and others from ICSB) continue in parallel with the IFSB. Freienhagen died in 1933.

After this, correspondence chess players started joining IFSB. At that time, there was only individual membership and only later did it become possible for countries to be members.

IFSB Champions: Eduard Dyckhoff and Eugen Busch (Germany), 1929; E.Dyckhoff, 1930; A.H.Priwonitz (Germany), 1931; Hans Müller (Austria), 1932; Marcel Duchamp (France), 1933; Hilding Persson (Sweden), 1934; Paul Keres (Estonia), 1935; Milan Vidmar (Yugoslavia), 1936; Miklos Szigeti (Hungary), 1937 and Edmund Adam (Germany), 1938.

IFSB European Olympiad: the Hungarian Team (Balogh, Nagy, Szigeti, Barcza, Boros and Szucz) won the Final (1937–1939).

When the Second World War began, the IFSB Board decided to discontinue its activity.

The top officials during the history of the IFSB here:

1928–1934: (Germany) R.Dührssen (President) – J.Keemink (vice-president)

1934–1935: (Denmark) K.Schjorring (President) – I. Abonyi (vice-president)

1935–1939: (Hungary) I.Abonyi (President) – H.W. von Massow (General Secretary)

== Current membership ==
ICCF, the present successor of the IFSB, is a federation of national member organizations. At this moment there are worldwide 56 ICCF national member federations.

== Presidents ==
1. (Switzerland) Jean Louis Ormond (1951–1955)
2. (Norway) Anders Elgesem (1955–1959)
3. (Germany) Hans Werner von Massow (1959–1987)
4. (Netherlands) Hendrik Mostert (1988–1996)
5. (Scotland) Alan Borwell (1997–2003)
6. (Czech Republic) Josef Mrkvicka (2003–2004)
7. (United States) Max Zavanelli (2005, acting)
8. (Algeria) Mohamed Samraoui (2005–2009)
9. (France) Éric Ruch (2009–Now)

== Tournaments ==
Using its own language-independent chess notation, ICCF organizes all kind of tournaments: individual and team championships, title norm tournaments and promotion tournaments (from Open Class until Master Class) – in postal and the ICCF correspondence server versions. Starting from 2011 ICCF organizes chess960 events.

ICCF is closely co-operating with the leading world chess organization FIDE. All ICCF titles, championships and ratings are recognised by FIDE.

== Titles ==
The correspondence chess title International Correspondence Chess Grandmaster is a title that is rewarded by ICCF when a candidate meets the one of following qualifications:

1. That player who places 1–3 in the World Championship final,(§1.5.2.2.a)
2. They are highest scoring player on board 1 in the final of the CC Olympiad after all scheduled tiebreaking rules are applied, but only with a positive score,(§1.5.2.2.b)
3. They gain at least two grandmaster norms in international title tournaments with a total of at least 24 games. (This number of games may be reduced if the player overscores sufficiently to achieve the standard norm requirements over 24 games).(§1.5.2.2.c)
4. The national federation representing the candidate makes an appropriately qualified application. For this, a two-third majority vote of Congress must be obtained.(§1.5.2.2.d)

Other ICCF correspondence chess titles include:

- SIM: Correspondence Chess Senior International Master
- IM: Correspondence Chess International Master
- CCM: Correspondence Chess Master
- CCE: Correspondence Chess Expert

Legacy titles (No longer awarded):

- LGM: Lady Grandmaster (equivalent to CCM)
- LIM: Lady International Master (equivalent to CCE)

== See also ==
- FIDE—Fédération Internationale des Échecs
- FIDE titles
- Chess title
- ICCF national member federations—Short articles about the federations
- ICCF numeric notation
- World Correspondence Chess Championship
- Correspondence Chess Olympiad
