= Surprise (disambiguation) =

Surprise is a brief emotional state experienced as the result of an unexpected significant event.

Surprise (sometimes spelled surprize) may also refer to:

== Places ==
- Surprise, Arizona, a city in the United States
- Surprise, Indiana, an unincorporated community in the United States
- Surprise, Nebraska, a village in the United States
- Surprise, New York, a populated place in the United States
- Surprise Valley (disambiguation)

== Arts and entertainment ==
- The Surprise (Watteau), a c. 1718 painting by Antoine Watteau

=== Film and television ===
==== Film ====
- Surprise (1991 film), a short by Pixar
- Surprise (2015 film), a Chinese film directed by Show Joy
- Surprise! (film), a 1995 short by Veit Helmer
- The Surprise (film), a Dutch film directed by Mike van Diem

==== TV ====
- Surprise (web series), a 2013–2015 Chinese web comedy series
- "Surprise" (The 7D), a 2014 episode
- "Surprise!" (Arthur), a 2014 episode
- "Surprise!" (Bluey), a 2024 episode
- "Surprise!" (BoJack Horseman), a 2019 episode
- "Surprise" (Buffy the Vampire Slayer), a 1998 episode
- "Surprise!" (Dexter's Laboratory), a 1997 episode
- "Surprise" (Dora the Explorer), a 2000 episode
- "Surprise" (Not Going Out), a 2014 episode
- "Surprise" (Scott & Bailey), a 2011 episode
- "Surprise" (Space Ghost Coast to Coast), a 1996 episode
- "Surprise" (Zoey 101), a 2006 episode
- "The Surprise", a 1972 episode of Adam-12
- "The Surprise", a 2011 episode of Bananas in Pyjamas
- "The Surprise", a 2011 episode of CommitMental
- "The Surprise", a 1957 episode of Date with the Angels
- "The Surprise" (Don't Wait Up), a 1988 episode
- "The Surprise", a 2018 episode of Friday Night Dinner
- "The Surprise", a 2011 episode of Iconicles
- "The Surprise", a 1998 episode of Keeping Mum
- "The Surprise", a 1981 episode of Knots Landing
- "The Surprise", a 1988 episode of Mother and Son
- "The Surprise", a 1995 episode of My Brother and Me
- "The Surprise", a 1963 episode of The Flintstones
- "The Surprise", a 1982 episode of Words and Pictures
- Surprises!, an Australian pre-school children's television series

=== Music ===
- 5urprise, a South Korean band
- Surprise Records, a record label
- Surprise Symphony, nickname of Symphony No. 94 (Haydn)

==== Albums ====
- Surprise (Crystal Waters album), 1991
- Surprise (Lynsey de Paul album), 1973
- Surprise (Paul Simon album), 2006
- Surprise (S.E.S. album), 2001
- Surprise (Syd Straw album), 1989
- Surprise (Sylvia album), 1984
- Surprises (album), a 1976 album by Herbie Mann
- Surprise, by Better Than Ezra, 1990
- Surprise!, by Fifteen, 1996

==== Songs ====
- "Surprise" (song), a 2022 song by Chloe Bailey
- "Surprise!" (song), a 1996 song by Bonnie Pink
- "Surprise", by HALO, 2015
- "Surprise", by James from the album Millionaires, 1999
- "Surprise", by Jolin Tsai from the album Lucky Number, 2001
- "Surprise", by Sugababes from the album Change, 2007
- "Surprise", by Gnarls Barkley from the album The Odd Couple, 2008
- "Surprises", by Billy Joel from the album The Nylon Curtain, 1982
- "Surprise", by Jars of Clay from the album Good Monsters, 2006
- "Surprise!", by +/- from the album You Are Here, 2003

== Boats ==
- Surprise 15, an American sailboat design
- Surprise 25, a French sailboat design

== Ships ==
- HMS Surprise (includes HMS Surprize), the name of several British Royal Navy ships; also,
  - HMS Surprise (replica ship), a modern tall ship, built at Lunenberg, Nova Scotia, Canada
  - HMS Surprise (novel), a 1973 historical naval novel by Patrick O'Brian
- USS Surprise, the name of several United States Navy ships
  - Surprise (1777 ship), the first American naval ship of the name
- Surprize (1780 ship), a British East India Company merchant ship
- Surprise (1813 privateer), a schooner launched in the U.S. that captured more than 30 British vessels before wrecking in 1815
- Surprise (paddle steamer), built 1831, the first steam powered vessel built and run in Australia
- Surprise (clipper), an 1850 clipper ship in the San Francisco and tea trades
- Surprise, a Sydney schooner that took London Missionary Society missionaries to Torres Strait Islanders in 1871
- Surprise (schooner), built in 1917–18 and still providing daily cruises for tourists on Penobscot Bay
- Royal Escape (1660 ship), the ex-collier Surprise

== Other uses ==
- Surprise (apple), a pink-fleshed apple
- Surprise Moriri (born 1980), South African footballer

== See also ==
- Self-information, a concept in information theory
- Shock (disambiguation)
- ¡Sorpresa!, a TV network whose name means "Surprise!" in Spanish
- Surprise factor, a storytelling technique
- Surprise, Surprise (disambiguation)
