= Archambault A31 =

Sailboat class

Development
- Designer: Joubert Nivelt Design
- Location: France
- Year: 2009
- Builder: Archambault Boats
- Role: Racer-Cruiser
- Name: Archambault A31

Boat
- Crew: 6-7
- Displacement: 6,945 lb (3,150 kg)
- Draft: 6.17 ft (1.88 m)

Hull
- Type: monohull
- Construction: fibreglass
- LOA: 31.3 ft (9.5 m)
- Beam: 10.58 ft (3.22 m)
- Engine: Inboard Nani 14 hp (10 kW) diesel engine

Hull appendages
- Keel: fin keel
- Ballast: 2,976 lb (1,350 kg)
- Rudder: internally-mounted spade-type rudder

Rig
- Rig type: Bermuda rig
- I foretriangle height: 39.67 ft (12.09 m)
- J foretriangle base: 12.00 ft (3.66 m)
- P mainsail luff: 39.58 ft (12.06 m)
- E mainsail foot: 13.33 ft (4.06 m)

Sails
- Sailplan: fractional rigged sloop
- Mainsail area: 307 sq ft (28.5 m^{2})
- Jib/genoa area: 248 sq ft (23.0 m^{2})
- Spinnaker area: 775 sq ft (72.0 m^{2})
- Upwind sail area: 554 sq ft (51.5 m^{2})

Racing
- PHRF: 99-108

The Archambault A31 is a French sailboat that was designed by Joubert Nivelt Design as an IRC racer-cruiser and first built in 2009.

The A31 is a scaled-down follow-on to the Archambault A35 and Archambault A40RC, both successful racers.

== Production ==
The design was built at the BG Race shipyard in Saint-Malo, France for Archambault Boats of Dangé-Saint-Romain. Production started in 2007 and ended in 2017. Archambault, which had been founded in 1967, went out of business in 2015. The BG Race shipyard, founded in 2013, itself went out of business in 2017.

== Design ==
The Archambault A31 is a racing keelboat, built predominantly of fibreglass. The hull is a single skin, vacuum-infused polyester fibreglass, while the deck is a PVC polyester, vacuum-infused sandwich. It has a 9/10 fractional sloop rig with aluminum spars, a keel-stepped mast and dual swept spreaders. The hull has a plumb stem; an open, reverse transom, an internally mounted spade-type rudder controlled by a D-shaped tiller with an extension and a fixed swept fin keel. The rudder is made from polyester and is mounted with stainless steel solid stock hardware on self aligning bearings. The boat has a light displacement of 6,945 lb (3,150 kg) and carries 2,976 lb (1,350 kg) of lead ballast. The boat has a draft of 6.17 ft (1.88 m) with the standard keel.

All lines are led to the cockpit. For sailing downwind the design may be equipped with a symmetrical, masthead 775 sq ft (72.0 m^{2}) spinnaker. Twin rudders were a factory option, as was an anchor locker. The design has a hidden swim ladder mounted in a transom tube. The mainsheet has a 9:1 mechanical advantage, while the adjustable backstay is 8:1. The Ronstan mainsheet traveller is located aft of the tiller. The boat has a lifting bridle that exits through an inspection port for crane launching.

The boat is fitted with an inboard Nanni 14 hp (10 kW) diesel engine for docking and manoeuvring. A 20 hp (15 kW) saildrive Nani was a factory option. The opaque plastic fuel tank holds 10.6 U.S. gallons (40 L; 8.8 imp gal) and the fresh water tank has a capacity of 26.4 U.S. gallons (100 L; 22.0 imp gal).

The design has sleeping accommodation for six people, with a double "V"-berth in the bow cabin, two straight settees in the main cabin and an aft cabin with a double berth on the port side. The main cabin has a drop-leaf table. The galley is located on the port side just forward of the companionway ladder. The galley is L-shaped and is equipped with a two-burner propane-fired stove, a 10.6 U.S. gallons (40 L; 8.8 imp gal) icebox and a sink. An oven and refrigerator were factory options. A navigation station is opposite the galley, on the starboard side. The head is located just aft of the navigation station on the starboard side and has 67 in (170 cm) of headroom. The interior is all white, moulded, structural fibreglass. Headroom in the main cabin is 72 in (180 cm), in the forward cabin 35 in (89 cm) and 67 in (170 cm) in the aft cabin.

The boat is normally raced with a crew of six or seven sailors and has a PHRF racing handicap rating of 99 (Nova Scotia) to 108 (New England).

== Operational history ==
In a 2009 review naval architect Robert H. Perry wrote, "the Archambault boats are quickly making a name for themselves as quality-built race winners in Europe. The new A31 should also be a very fast boat and it is interesting to note the similarities between this design and that of the 9.5-meter Nacira. In this case the target is the IRC racer-cruiser class. This means that the A31, designed by Joubert, Nivelt and Mercier, will have accommodations designed to make it fit into that category, ensuring that it will be a dual-purpose boat."

A review in Canadian Yachting, by Katie Nicholl described the interior, saying that it "sleeps 6 with an aft double-berth, a well-appointed galley, enclosed aft master suite and a spacious head that combines a work/storage area. With the large cockpit with a super-sized aft locker (plenty big enough for a lift raft, fenders, and lifejackets) and 1.82m (6 ft.) headroom below; the A31 rivals any other modern 31-footer in creature comforts. The interior has light warm wood, clean white finishes and modern microfibre upholsteries. Handle holds below match the through-hull bolts that hold on the jib tracks. The vacuum-infused, resin glass sandwiched hull, injection infusion structural liner and composite deck is built using an environmentally sound process while eliminating airborne toxins."

== See also ==
- List of sailing boat types
