= Archambault Boats =

Sailboat manufacturer

- Type: Privately held company
- Industry: Boat building
- Founded: 1954
- Defunct: 2014
- Headquarters: Dangé-Saint-Romain, France
- Products: Sailboats

Archambault Boats (Bateaux Archambault in french) was a French boat builder based in Dangé-Saint-Romain. The company specialized in the design and manufacture of monohull fibreglass sailboats.

== History ==
Archambault Shipyard was founded in 1954 by Jean Archambault. The company ran into financial problems in 2011. In November 2012, Gilles Caminade purchased the business retaining Emmanuel Archambault as general manager. In 2015, Archambault was intended to be purchased by BG Race, a company founded in 2013 by Louis Burton and Servane Escoffier, who wanted to move production to Saint-Malo, planning to call it Archambault by BG Race, but the transaction was not completed. At the end of 2017 the partners sold Archambault to the pilot and amateur yachtsman Jean-Charles Thomas, who had planned to restart production, but by 2023 there was no indication this had been achieved and operations seem to have come to an end in 2014.

The first designs produced were the Brick and the Atlante in the late 1960s. The smallest boat produced was the Archambault Bagheera, which entered production in 1968 and had a length overall of 19.68 ft (6.00 m).

The company used the design services of Joubert Nivelt Design for many of its racers, including the 2012 Archambault A27.

The Archambault A31, a scaled-down follow-on to the successful Archambault A35 and Archambault A40RC racers, was introduced in 2009. In a 2009 review of the A31 naval architect Robert H. Perry wrote, "the Archambault boats are quickly making a name for themselves as quality-built race winners in Europe."

The company's M34 was selected as the one-design class boat for the Tour de France à la voile in 2011 and served in that role until 2014.

During its lifetime the company was a mid-sized boat builder, neither building "one-off" custom boats nor large production runs. In 2012 it was reported that they were building 160 boats per year, with 60% being exported from France.

In a 2014 review of the A13 written for Sails Magazine, Kevin Green noted, "the relatively small number of Archambaults in Australia have had some big wins over the years which says a lot for this small boutique French yard that excels at building competitive cruiser-racers, with the emphasis heavily on the performance side of that equation."

One of the last boats built was the Archambault A13, a 43.0 ft (13.1 m) racer. Intended for mass production by BG Race, only one boat was completed before the company went out of business early in 2015.

== Boats ==
Summary of boats built by Archambault Boats:

- Herbulaot Brick - 1967
- Mallard Atlante - 1967
- Archambault Bagheera - 1968
- Archambault Surprise 25 - 1977
- Archambault Suspens - 1979
- Archambault Coco - 1985
- Sprint 95 - 1989
- Archambault Grand Surprise - 1999
- Sprinto - 2000
- Archambault A40 - 2004
- Archambault A40RC - 2005
- Archambault A35 - 2006
- Archambault A31 - 2009
- Archambault M34 - 2010
- Archambault A27 - 2012
- Archambault A35R - 2014
- Archambault A35RC - 2014
- Archambault A13 - 2014

== See also ==
- List of sailboat designers and manufacturers
