= Autoroute 40 =

Autoroute 40 may refer to:

- Quebec Autoroute 40 a Quebec highway
- A40 autoroute, a French motorway

== See also ==
- A40 roads
- List of highways numbered 40
