= Archambault A13 =

French sailboat class

A13

Development
- Designer: Bernard Nivelt of Joubert Nivelt Design
- Location: France
- Year: 2014
- No. built: one
- Builder: Archambault Boats
- Role: Racer-Cruiser
- Name: A13

Boat
- Displacement: 14,220 lb (6,450 kg)
- Draft: 8.5 ft (2.6 m)

Hull
- Type: monohull
- Construction: fibreglass
- LOA: 43.0 ft (13.1 m)
- Beam: 13.58 ft (4.14 m)
- Engine: Volvo 30 hp (22 kW) diesel engine

Hull appendages
- Keel: fin keel
- Rudders: dual, internally-mounted spade-type rudders

Rig
- Rig type: Bermuda rig

Sails
- Sailplan: masthead sloop
- Mainsail area: 614 sq ft (57.0 m^{2})
- Spinnaker area: 1,938 sq ft (180.0 m^{2})
- Gennaker area: 479 sq ft (44.5 m^{2})
- Upwind sail area: 1,093 sq ft (101.5 m^{2})
- Downwind sail area: 2,551 sq ft (237.0 m^{2})

The Archambault A13 is a French sailboat that was designed by Joubert Nivelt Design, with Bernard Nivelt as principal designer. It was designed as an IRC racer-cruiser and first built in 2014. The designation indicates the boat's approximate length overall in metres.

== Production ==
The prototype was built under the supervision of Michele Molino at the BG Race shipyard in Saint-Malo, France for Archambault Boats of Dangé-Saint-Romain. The intention was that the boat would be put into production, but only one was boat completed before Archambault, which had been founded in 1967, went out of business in 2015. The BG Race shipyard, founded in 2013, itself went out of business in 2017.

== Design ==
The A13 is a racing keelboat, built predominantly of vinylester fibreglass vacuum infusion foam sandwich. It has a masthead sloop rig with Axxon carbon fibre spars including a bowsprit, a keel-stepped mast and a dual swept spreaders. The hull has a plumb stem; a plumb, open transom; dual, internally mounted spade-type rudders controlled by dual wheels; and a fixed fin keel without a weighted bulb. The hull is wide and flat-bottomed, to promote planing and provide form stability over ballast stability. It displaces 14,220 lb (6,450 kg). The design had been assessed for a carbon fibre hull, but it was found that the potential benefit would have been too small to justify the additional cost.

The boat has a draft of 8.6 ft (2.6 m) with the standard keel and is fitted with a Swedish Volvo diesel engine of 30 hp (22 kW) for docking and manoeuvring.

The design has four different possible internal layouts, but typical is sleeping accommodation for four to eight people, with two cabins and one head.

For sailing downwind the design may be equipped with an asymmetrical spinnaker of 1,938 sq ft (180.0 m^{2}). Factory options included a lifting keel, single tiller steering, a carbon fibre deck for rigidity, a symmetrical spinnaker, transom boat cradle, bimini top and spray hood and bow thrusters.

The company had envisioned offering four different versions of the boat, the A13 Cruiser, A13IRC comfort racer, A13 IRC racer and the minimum weight A13 Racer.

== Operational history ==
In a 2014 review written for Sails Magazine when the A13 was first introduced, Kevin Green wrote, "the versatile A13 offers a wide choice of sailing but the 43-foot length is in the sweetspot that gives owners' competitive racing under IRC using an asymmetrical spinnaker, but without the big crew responsibilities or costs of say a TP52 campaign. The A13 has a modern IRC optimized shape with a flared transom, large cockpit and rounded hull with large bowsprit. The open cockpit is available with tiller for inshore racing or double wheels for offshore racing. The gunwhales have additional chine for comfy hiking, but the deck is also very clean and flush in front of the mast for uncluttered spinnaker work and jib hoists. The standard rig is high modulus Axxon carbon with both masthead spinnaker types used while the jib cars are transverse."

The sole boat completed was ordered by Eric de Turckheim and named Teasing Machine.

In its initial race, the 2014 Commodores' Cup, Teasing Machine finished about 15 minutes behind the most competitive Ker 40 racer in a 13-hour offshore race in light to moderate winds. In its second race, the Middle Sea Race held off Malta, it was dismasted.

In the 2015 season Teasing Machine finished third in its class in the Fastnet Race and won the 2015 Sydney to Hobart Yacht Race for its class and nearly finished first overall, having led the race in corrected time until near the end of the race. The boat was then shipped to Panama and onto Antigua to compete in the Caribbean 600 race, winning its class.

During the 2016 racing season the boat won its class in the Caribbean 600 and beat the entire field, except two larger boats. Back in Europe it won the Commodore's Cup and was named RORC Boat of the Year 2016. At this point in time de Turkcheim had a bigger boat commissioned, a 54 ft (16 m) design, which he named Teasing Machine 54 and put the A13 up for sale.

Teasing Machine was purchased in mid-2017 by Mark Emerson and renamed Phosphorus II, after a previous 2003 model Rodman JV42 racing boat, Phosphorus I, that he had owned from 2011 to 2016.

The boat was raced in 2019 in RORC races, with two class wins and one overall win. The boat was fourth overall in the IRC and won the Peter Harrison Trophy for RORC youth. Emerson had planned to race the boat in 2020, before the COVID-19 pandemic halted the season.

== See also ==
- List of sailing boat types
