= Grand Surprise =

Grand Surprise may refer to:

- Archambault Grand Surprise, a French sailboat design
- Grand surprise, a common name of the moth Nymphalis antiopa found in Eurasia and North America

== See also ==
- Surprise (disambiguation)
