= A35 =

A35 or A-35 may refer to:

== Roads ==
- A35 expressway (Canada), a road in Quebec connecting Saint-Jean-sur-Richelieu at the US border and A-10 in Chambly
- A35 road (England), a road connecting Honiton, Devon and Southampton, Hampshire
- A35 motorway (France), a road connecting the German and the Swiss borders via Strasbourg
- A35 motorway (Netherlands), a road connecting Enschede and Wierden
- A35 motorway (Spain), a road in Valencia connecting Xàtiva and the N-340/ CV-40 to Almansa
- A35 road (Sri Lanka), a road connecting Paranthan and Mullaitivu

== Other uses ==
- A-35 anti-ballistic missile system, a system deployed around Moscow, currently upgraded to the A-135 system
- Aero A.35, a Czech airliner of the 1930s
- Archambault A35, a French sailboat design
- Archambault A35R, a French sailboat design
- Austin A35, a car made by the British Motor Corporation under the Austin Motor Company marque
- Samsung Galaxy A35 5G, a mid-range Android-based smartphone
- Junkers A 35, a German aircraft of the 1920s
- Vultee A-35, a US attack aircraft of World War II, an improved version of the A-31 Vengeance
- English Opening, Encyclopaedia of Chess Openings code A35, among others

== See also ==
- List of highways numbered 35
