= Sprint 95 =

Sailboat class

Development
- Designer: Joubert Nivelt Design
- Location: France
- Year: 1989
- No. built: 90
- Builder: Archambault Boats
- Role: Racer-Cruiser
- Name: Sprint 95

Boat
- Displacement: 4,950 lb (2,245 kg)
- Draft: 5.91 ft (1.80 m)

Hull
- Type: monohull
- Construction: fibreglass
- LOA: 31.10 ft (9.48 m)
- LWL: 27.56 ft (8.40 m)
- Beam: 9.58 ft (2.92 m)
- Engine: Yanmar 1GM10 10 hp (7 kW) diesel engine

Hull appendages
- Keel: fin keel
- Ballast: 1,764 lb (800 kg)
- Rudder: internally-mounted spade-type rudder

Rig
- Rig type: Bermuda rig

Sails
- Sailplan: fractional rigged sloop
- Upwind sail area: 570 sq ft (53 m^{2})

The Sprint 95 is a French sailboat that was designed by Joubert Nivelt Design as a racer-cruiser and first built in 1989. The boat's nomenclature indicates its approximate metric length overall in decimetres.

== Production ==
The design was built by Archambault Boats of Dangé-Saint-Romain, France, with 90 boats completed between 1989 and 1997, but it is now out of production.

== Design ==
The Sprint 95 is a recreational keelboat, built predominantly of fibreglass. It has a fractional sloop rig with aluminum spars. The hull has a raked stem, a walk-through reverse transom, an internally mounted spade-type rudder controlled by a tiller and a fixed fin keel or optional shoal draft keel. It displaces 4,950 lb (2,245 kg) and carries 1,764 lb (800 kg) of ballast.

The boat has a draft of 5.91 ft (1.80 m) with the standard keel and 4.27 ft (1.30 m) with the optional shoal draft keel.

The boat is fitted with a Japanese Yanmar 1GM10 diesel engine of 10 hp (7 kW) for docking and manoeuvring. The fuel tank holds 8 U.S. gallons (30 L; 6.7 imp gal) and the fresh water tank has a capacity of 13 U.S. gallons (49 L; 11 imp gal). It has a hull speed of 7.03 kn (13.02 km/h).

== See also ==
- List of sailing boat types
