= Archambault Bagheera =

Sailboat class

Development
- Location: France
- Year: 1968
- Builder: Archambault Boats

Boat
- Displacement: 882 lb (400 kg)
- Draft: 3.12 ft (0.95 m)

Hull
- Type: monohull
- Construction: fibreglass
- LOA: 19.68 ft (6.00 m)
- LWL: 15.58 ft (4.75 m)
- Beam: 5.91 ft (1.80 m)
- Engine: Outboard motor

Hull appendages
- Keel: fin keel
- Ballast: 463 lb (210 kg)
- Rudder: skeg-mounted rudder

Rig
- Rig type: Bermuda rig

Sails
- Sailplan: fractional rigged sloop
- Total sail area: 184.00 sq ft (17.094 m^{2})

The Archambault Bagheera is a recreational keelboat that was first built in 1968.

== Production ==
The design was built by Archambault Boats of Dangé-Saint-Romain, France, starting in 1968, but it is now out of production. Archambault, which had been founded in 1967, went out of business in 2015. With a length overall of 19.68 ft (6.00 m), the Bagheera was the smallest boat produced by Archambault.

== Design ==
The Bagheera is a built predominantly of fibreglass, with wood trim. It has a fractional sloop rig with aluminum spars, a deck-stepped mast with wire standing rigging. The hull has a raked stem, a reverse transom, a lazarette, a skeg-mounted rudder controlled by a tiller and a fixed fin keel. It displaces 882 lb (400 kg) and carries 463 lb (210 kg) of ballast.

The boat has a draft of 3.12 ft (0.95 m) with the standard keel. The boat is normally fitted with a small outboard motor for docking and manoeuvring and has a hull speed of 5.29 kn (9.80 km/h).
