= A40 =

A40 or A-40 may refer to:

== Roads ==
- Autoroute 40, a highway in Québec
- A40 motorway (France)
- A40 motorway (Germany)
- A40 road (Great Britain), a road connecting London and Fishguard, Wales
- A40 road (Northern Ireland), a road running from the L/Derry to Raphoe
- A40 road (Isle of Man), a primary road which connects the A3 with the A1

== Other uses ==
- A40, a Queen's Pawn Game, Encyclopaedia of Chess Openings code
- Antonov A-40, a Soviet flying tank design
- Archambault A40, a French sailboat design
- Archambault A40RC, a French sailboat design
- Austin A40, a car from the British Motor Corporation
  - Innocenti A40, variant of the Austin A40 produced by Innocenti
- Beriev A-40, an aircraft
- Continental A40, a four-cylinder, horizontally opposed, air-cooled aircraft engine
- Route A40 (WMATA), a bus route operated by the Washington Metropolitan Area Transit Authority
- Samsung Galaxy A40, a midrange smartphone by Samsung

== See also ==
- List of highways numbered 40
