= Suspens =

Sailboat class

Development
- Designer: Joubert Nivelt Design
- Location: France
- Year: 1979
- No. built: 63
- Builder: Archambault Boats
- Role: Racer-Cruiser
- Name: Suspens

Boat
- Displacement: 6,118 lb (2,775 kg)
- Draft: 5.91 ft (1.80 m)

Hull
- Type: monohull
- Construction: fibreglass
- LOA: 30.35 ft (9.25 m)
- LWL: 25.59 ft (7.80 m)
- Beam: 9.84 ft (3.00 m)
- Engine: Renault Couach 7 hp (5 kW) diesel engine

Hull appendages
- Keel: fin keel
- Ballast: 1,830 lb (830 kg)
- Rudder: internally-mounted spade-type rudder

Rig
- Rig type: Bermuda rig
- I foretriangle height: 35.27 ft (10.75 m)
- J foretriangle base: 10.66 ft (3.25 m)
- P mainsail luff: 38.06 ft (11.60 m)
- E mainsail foot: 13.78 ft (4.20 m)

Sails
- Sailplan: fractional rigged sloop
- Mainsail area: 288 sq ft (26.8 m^{2})
- Jib/genoa area: 174 sq ft (16.2 m^{2})
- Spinnaker area: 861 sq ft (80.0 m^{2})
- Other sails: genoa: 281 sq ft (26.1 m^{2})
- Upwind sail area: 569 sq ft (52.9 m^{2})
- Downwind sail area: 1,150 sq ft (107 m^{2})

The Suspens (English: Suspense) is a French sailboat that was designed by Joubert Nivelt Design as a racer-cruiser and first built in 1979.

== Production ==
The design was built by Archambault Boats of Dangé-Saint-Romain, France. The production run was eight years, from 1979 to 1987, with 63 boats completed, but it is now out of production.

== Design ==
The Suspens is a recreational keelboat, built predominantly of fibreglass. It has a 7/8 fractional sloop rig with aluminum spars, a keel-stepped mast, wire standing rigging and a single set of swept spreaders. The hull has a raked stem, a sharply reverse transom, an internally mounted spade-type rudder controlled by a tiller and a fixed fin keel. It displaces 6,118 lb (2,775 kg) and carries 1,830 lb (830 kg) of cast iron ballast.

The boat has a draft of 5.91 ft (1.80 m) with the standard keel.

The boat is fitted with a French Renault Couach diesel engine of 7 hp (5 kW) for docking and manoeuvring. The fuel tank holds 7.9 U.S. gallons (30 L; 6.6 imp gal) and the fresh water tank has a capacity of 31.7 U.S. gallons (120 L; 26.4 imp gal).

The design has sleeping accommodation for six people, with a double "V"-berth in the bow cabin, an L-shaped and a straight settee in the main cabin around a drop leaf table and two aft quarter berths. The galley is located on the starboard side just forward of the companionway ladder. The galley is equipped with a two-burner stove and a stainless steel sink. A navigation station is opposite the galley, on the port side. The head is located just aft of the bow cabin on the port side.

For sailing downwind the design may be equipped with a symmetrical spinnaker of 861 sq ft (80.0 m^{2}). It has a hull speed of 6.78 kn (12.56 km/h).

== See also ==
- List of sailing boat types
