= Route 35 (disambiguation) =

Route 35 is a common name for roads and highways in many countries.

Route 35 may also refer to:

- Route 35 (MTA Maryland), a bus route in Baltimore, Maryland and its suburbs
- London Buses route 35
- Melbourne tram route 35, or City Circle tram
