= Brick (keelboat) =

Sailboat class

Development
- Designer: Jean-Jacques Herbulot
- Location: France
- Year: 1964
- Builders: Chantier Mallard; Archambault Boats
- Name: Brick

Boat
- Displacement: 3,968 lb (1,800 kg)
- Draft: 3.94 ft (1.20 m)

Hull
- Type: monohull
- Construction: fibreglass
- LOA: 26.08 ft (7.95 m)
- LWL: 31.33 ft (9.55 m)
- Beam: 8.20 ft (2.50 m)

Hull appendages
- Keel: fin keel
- Ballast: 1,543 lb (700 kg)
- Rudder: skeg-mounted rudder

Rig
- Rig type: Bermuda rig

Sails
- Sailplan: fractional rigged sloop
- Total sail area: 272.00 sq ft (25.270 m^{2})

The Brick (English: Brig, referring to the class of sailing ship) is a French sailboat that was designed by Jean-Jacques Herbulot and first built in 1964.

== Production ==
The design was built by Chantier Mallard starting in 1964 and by Archambault Boats of Dangé-Saint-Romain, France, starting in 1967, but it is now out of production. Archambault, which had been founded in 1967, went out of business in 2015.

== Design ==
The Brick is a recreational keelboat, built predominantly of wood. It has a 9/10 fractional sloop rig, with a single set of unswept spreaders. The hull has a raked stem, a raised reverse transom, a skeg-mounted rudder controlled by a tiller and a fixed fin keel. The deck has a reverse sheer.

It displaces 3,968 lb (1,800 kg) and carries 1,543 lb (700 kg) of ballast. It has a hull speed of 6.19 kn (11.46 km/h).

== See also ==
- List of sailing boat types
