= Route 40 (disambiguation) =

Route 40 is a common name for roads and highways in many countries.

Route 40 may also refer to:

- QuickBus, a bus rapid transit service Baltimore, Maryland and its suburbs designated Route 40
- London Buses route 40
