= Sprinto =

2000s French recreational keelboat

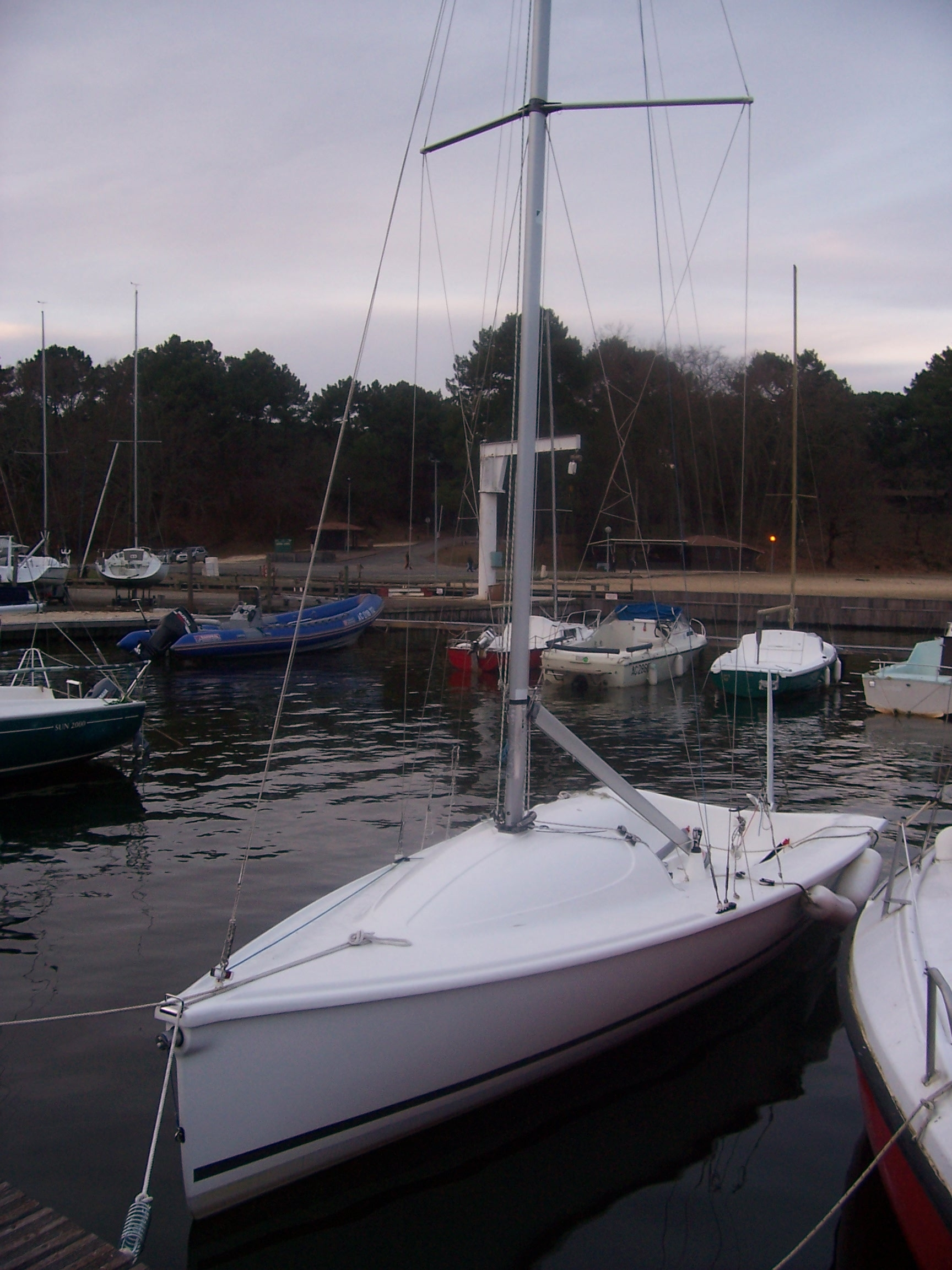

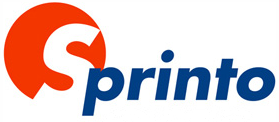

Development
- Designer: Joubert Nivelt Design
- Location: France
- Year: 2000
- Builder: Archambault Boats
- Role: racer
- Name: Sprinto

Boat
- Displacement: 1,323 lb (600 kg)
- Draft: 5.25 ft (1.60 m)

Hull
- Type: monohull
- Construction: fibreglass
- LOA: 21.65 ft (6.60 m)
- LWL: 21.49 ft (6.55 m)
- Beam: 7.51 ft (2.29 m)
- Engine: outboard motor

Hull appendages
- Keel: swing keel
- Ballast: 441 lb (200 kg)
- Rudder: transom-mounted rudder

Rig
- Rig type: Bermuda rig
- I foretriangle height: 21.88 ft (6.67 m)
- J foretriangle base: 5.91 ft (1.80 m)
- P mainsail luff: 26.64 ft (8.12 m)
- E mainsail foot: 10.37 ft (3.16 m)

Sails
- Sailplan: fractional rigged sloop
- Mainsail area: 138.13 sq ft (12.833 m^{2})
- Jib/genoa area: 64.66 sq ft (6.007 m^{2})
- Upwind sail area: 202.78 sq ft (18.839 m^{2})

The Sprinto is a French sailboat that was designed by Joubert Nivelt Design as a racer and first built in 2000.

== Production ==
The design was built by Archambault Boats of Dangé-Saint-Romain, France, starting in 2000, but it is now out of production. Archambault, which had been founded in 1967, went out of business in 2015.

The design was changed through its production run, incorporating design changes over time.

== Design ==
The Sprinto is a recreational keelboat, built predominantly of fibreglass. It has a fractional sloop rig with aluminum spars, a deck-stepped mast, wire standing rigging and a single set of swept spreaders. The hull has a plumb stem, a sharply reverse transom, a transom-hung rudder controlled by a tiller and a swing keel. Later models had a drop keel and a revised sailplan layout. It mounts a retractable bowsprit, displaces 1,323 lb (600 kg) and carries 441 lb (200 kg) of ballast.

The boat has a draft of 5.25 ft (1.60 m) with the swing keel extended and 0.66 ft (0.20 m) with it retracted, allowing beaching or ground transportation on a trailer.

The boat is normally fitted with a small outboard motor for docking and manoeuvring.

For sailing downwind the design may be equipped with an asymmetrical spinnaker. It has a hull speed of 6.2 kn (11.5 km/h).
