= Atlante (keelboat) =

Sailboat class

Development
- Designer: Georges Auzepy-Brenneur
- Location: France
- Year: 1965
- No. built: 280
- Builders: Chantier Mallard; Archambault Boats

Boat
- Displacement: 5,300 lb (2,404 kg)
- Draft: 4.27 ft (1.30 m)

Hull
- Type: monohull
- Construction: fibreglass
- LOA: 27.79 ft (8.47 m)
- LWL: 21.00 ft (6.40 m)
- Beam: 8.10 ft (2.47 m)
- Engine: Inboard motor

Hull appendages
- Keel: fin keel
- Rudder: internally-mounted spade-type rudder

Rig
- Rig type: Bermuda rig
- I foretriangle height: 26.25 ft (8.00 m)
- J foretriangle base: 9.51 ft (2.90 m)
- P mainsail luff: 27.99 ft (8.53 m)
- E mainsail foot: 9.68 ft (2.95 m)

Sails
- Sailplan: masthead sloop
- Mainsail area: 135.47 sq ft (12.586 m^{2})
- Jib/genoa area: 124.82 sq ft (11.596 m^{2})
- Total sail area: 260.29 sq ft (24.182 m^{2})

The Atlante (English: Atlas of mythology), is a French sailboat that was designed by Georges Auzepy-Brenneur and first built in 1965.

== Production ==
The design was built by Chantier Mallard starting in 1965 and by Archambault Boats of Dangé-Saint-Romain, France, starting in 1967. Production ended in 1977, with 280 boats completed. Archambault, which had been founded in 1967, went out of business in 2015.

== Design ==
The Atlante is a recreational keelboat, built predominantly of fibreglass, with wood trim. It has a masthead sloop rig. The hull has a spooned, raked stem; a raised, plum transom; an internally mounted spade-type rudder controlled by a tiller and a fixed fin keel. It displaces 5,300 lb (2,404 kg).

The boat has a draft of 4.27 ft (1.30 m) with the standard keel and is fitted with a inboard engine for docking and manoeuvring. It has a hull speed of 6.14 kn (11.37 km/h).

== See also ==
- List of sailing boat types
