= Archambault Coco =

Sailboat class

Development
- Designer: Harlé - Mortain
- Location: France
- Year: 1985
- No. built: 110
- Builder: Archambault Boats
- Role: Racer
- Name: Archambault Coco

Boat
- Displacement: 2,535 lb (1,150 kg)
- Draft: 4.46 ft (1.36 m)

Hull
- Type: monohull
- Construction: fibreglass
- LOA: 21.33 ft (6.50 m)
- LWL: 20.34 ft (6.20 m)
- Beam: 8.86 ft (2.70 m)

Hull appendages
- Keel: fin keel
- Ballast: 992 lb (450 kg)
- Rudder: skeg-mounted rudder

Rig
- Rig type: Bermuda rig

Sails
- Sailplan: fractional rigged sloop
- Mainsail area: 187 sq ft (17.4 m^{2})
- Jib/genoa area: 98 sq ft (9.1 m^{2})
- Spinnaker area: 431 sq ft (40.0 m^{2})
- Gennaker area: 646 sq ft (60.0 m^{2})
- Other sails: Genoa: 183 sq ft (17.0 m^{2})
- Upwind sail area: 365 sq ft (33.9 m^{2})
- Downwind sail area: 1,010 sq ft (94 m^{2})

The Archambault Coco is a French sailboat that was designed by Harlé - Mortain as a Classe Mini racer for racing in the Mini Transat 6.50. It was first built in 1985.

== Production ==
The design was built by Archambault Boats of Dangé-Saint-Romain, France, with 110 boats completed between 1985 and 2002, but it is now out of production. Archambault, which had been founded in 1967, went out of business in 2015.

== Design ==
The Coco is a racing keelboat, built predominantly of fibreglass. It has a fractional sloop rig. The hull has a plumb stem, a reverse transom, a skeg-mounted rudder controlled by a tiller and a fixed fin keel. It displaces 2,535 lb (1,150 kg) and carries 992 lb (450 kg) of ballast.

For sailing downwind the design may be equipped with a symmetrical spinnaker of 431 sq ft (40.0 m^{2}) or an asymmetrical spinnaker of 646 sq ft (60.0 m^{2}). It has a hull speed of 6.04 kn (11.19 km/h).

== Operational history ==
Classe Mini

The boat is supported by an active club, the Class Mini 650, that organizes racing events for Classe Mini boats with a length overall of 21.33 ft (6.50 m). The major race run for this class of sailboats is the Mini Transat 6.50, a solo transatlantic yacht race, that typically starts in France and ends in Le Marin, Martinique in the Caribbean.

== See also ==
- List of sailing boat types
