= Archambault A27 =

Sailboat class

Development
- Designer: Joubert Nivelt Design
- Location: France
- Year: 2012
- Builder: Archambault Boats
- Role: Racer
- Name: Archambault A27

Boat
- Displacement: 4,750 lb (2,155 kg)
- Draft: 5.42 ft (1.65 m)

Hull
- Type: monohull
- Construction: fibreglass foam sandwich
- LOA: 27.39 ft (8.35 m)
- LWL: 23.79 ft (7.25 m)
- Beam: 9.78 ft (2.98 m)
- Engine: Inboard 13 hp (10 kW) diesel engine or outboard motor

Hull appendages
- Keel: fin keel
- Ballast: 1,764 lb (800 kg)
- Rudder: skeg-mounted/internally-mounted spade-type/transom-mounted rudder

Rig
- Rig type: Bermuda rig
- I foretriangle height: 35.00 ft (10.67 m)
- J foretriangle base: 10.17 ft (3.10 m)
- P mainsail luff: 35.76 ft (10.90 m)
- E mainsail foot: 12.63 ft (3.85 m)

Sails
- Sailplan: fractional rigged sloop
- Mainsail area: 258 sq ft (24.0 m^{2})
- Jib/genoa area: 188 sq ft (17.5 m^{2})
- Spinnaker area: 786 sq ft (73.0 m^{2})
- Gennaker area: 786 sq ft (73.0 m^{2})
- Upwind sail area: 447 sq ft (41.5 m^{2})
- Downwind sail area: 1,044 sq ft (97.0 m^{2})

The Archambault A27 is a French sailboat that was designed by Joubert Nivelt Design as a racer and first built in 2012.

== Production ==
The design was built by Archambault Boats in Dangé-Saint-Romain, France, starting in 2012, but it is now out of production as the company ceased business in 2015.

== Design ==
The Archambault A27 is a racing keelboat, built predominantly of fibreglass. The hull is a single skin, vacuum-infused polyester fibreglass, while the deck is a PVC polyester, vacuum-infused sandwich. It has a fractional sloop rig with aluminum spars, a retractable bowsprit, a deck-stepped mast and two sets of swept spreaders. The hull has a plumb stem; an open, plumb transom; an internally mounted spade-type rudder controlled by a tiller with an extension and a fixed fin keel, twin keels or a hydraulically operated swing keel with dual rudders. It displaces 4,750 lb (2,155 kg) and carries 1,764 lb (800 kg) of cast iron ballast.

The single fin keel-equipped version of the boat has a draft of 5.67 ft (1.73 m), the twin keel version has a draft of 3.83 ft (1.17 m), while the swing keel-equipped version has a draft of 6.92 ft (2.11 m) with the keel extended and 3.08 ft (0.94 m) with it retracted, allowing operation in shallow water.

The boat is fitted with either an inboard diesel engine of 12 hp (9 kW) with a sail drive, or a small outboard motor for docking and manoeuvring. The fuel tank holds 7.9 U.S. gallons (30 L; 6.6 imp gal) and a 13 U.S. gallons (49 L; 11 imp gal) freshwater tank is optional.

The design has sleeping accommodation for four people, with a double "V"-berth in the bow cabin and two straight settees in the main cabin, along with a centre table. The galley is located on both sides just aft the bow cabin. The galley is equipped with an optional gimbaled stove and a single sink. The head is a chemical type and is located under the bow "V"-berth. Ventilation is provided by a foredeck hatch.

For sailing downwind the design may be equipped with a symmetrical spinnaker or an asymmetrical spinnaker of 786 sq ft (73.0 m^{2}). The mainsheet traveller is set into the deck, just aft of the tiller. It has a hull speed of 6.70 kn (12.41 km/h), but will also plane.

== Operational history ==
In a 2012 Yacht magazine review Michael Good wrote, "a bowsprit and aggressive lines betray the sporty genes of this Joubert-Nivelt design that promises high performance potential. The interior arrangement, which is relatively comfortable for a boat of this size, with four bunks, an open forward cabin, and a standard porta-potti, turns the A27 into a weekender or even a modest cruising boat, with the optional comfort package that includes additional lockers, settees with backrests, a saloon table, a stove, and a 50-liter water tank."

Adam Cort of Sail magazine wrote a review in 2014, saying, "with its blunt ends, retractable sprit, wide-open racing cockpit and hiking wings, is very much the kind of a boat that stands out in a crowd. But what really impressed me about this little sportster (aside from its performance) were the accommodations."

Sail magazine named the boat one of its Best Boats 2014, in the Performance Monohull (30ft and under) class, saying, "this athletic-looking racer features a plumb bow with a slightly upturned knuckle just above the waterline, a hard chine, hiking wings, and a planing-friendly undercarriage than transitions into beamy, equally planing-friendly stern sections."

== See also ==
- List of sailing boat types

Similar sailboats

- Catalina 275 Sport
