= Daniel M. Fleetwood =

American scientist, inventor, engineer, and innovator

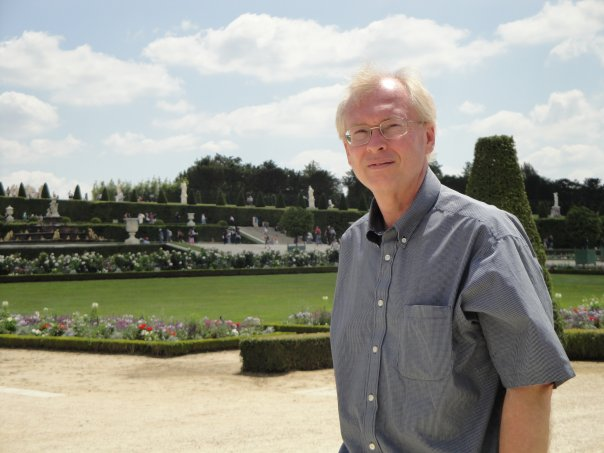
- Dan Fleetwood in 2014
- Born: August 3, 1958 (age 68); Surprise, Indiana, U.S.
- Citizenship: United States
- Occupations: Inventor, scientist, engineer, professor (Vanderbilt University)
- Known for: Flicker noise Semiconductor device physics Radiation effects of semiconductor devices Soft error
- Spouse: Betsy Fleetwood

Academic background
- Education: Purdue University

Academic work
- Doctoral students: Tania Roy
- Chess career
- Title: ICCF Grandmaster (2008)
- ICCF rating: 2556 (October 2021)
- ICCF peak rating: 2597 (October 2013)

Daniel M. Fleetwood (born August 3, 1958) is an American scientist, inventor, engineer and innovator. He is credited as being one of the first to identify the origins of flicker noise in semiconductor devices and its usefulness in understanding the effects of ionizing radiation on microelectronic devices and materials.

Fleetwood is the Olin H. Landreth Chair of Electrical Engineering at Vanderbilt University in Nashville, Tennessee. His research work focuses on the effects of ionizing radiation on microelectronic devices and materials, origins of 1/f noise in semiconductors and radiation hardness assurance. In 1997 he received R&D 100 and IndustryWeek magazine awards for co-inventing a new type of computer memory chip based on mobile protons. The chip was recognized as Discover magazine's 1998 Invention of the Year in computer hardware and electronics. In 2000 he was named one of the top 250 most highly cited researchers in engineering by the Institute for Scientific Information. He is a Fellow of the Institute of Electrical and Electronics Engineers and American Physical Society, and a Grandmaster of International Correspondence Chess.

== Early life and education ==
Fleetwood was born on August 3, 1958, in Surprise, Indiana, to Louis and Dorothy Fleetwood. He graduated from Seymour High School (Indiana) in 1976. He took active interest in sports and was a member of the Seymour High School baseball team, pitching a perfect game in 1976. He joined Department of Physics and Applied Mathematics in Purdue University as an undergraduate. He graduated from Purdue in 1984 with a PhD in physics. He received the 1984 Lark-Horovitz Award, Purdue University in recognition of demonstrated ability and exceptional promise in research in solid-state physics.

== Career ==
=== Sandia National Laboratories ===
Fleetwood joined Sandia National Laboratories, Albuquerque, New Mexico, in 1984. He was named a Distinguished Member of the technical staff in the Radiation Technology and Assurance Department in 1990. In 1997 he received R&D 100 and IndustryWeek magazine awards for co-invention of a new type of computer memory chip based on mobile protons in Silicon dioxide (protonic nonvolatile field effect transistor memory). This chip was also recognized as Discover magazine's 1998 Invention of the Year in computer hardware and electronics. In 2000 he was named one of the top 250 most highly cited researchers in Engineering by the Institute for Scientific Information.

=== Vanderbilt University ===
In 1999 Fleetwood left Sandia to accept the position of professor of electrical engineering at Vanderbilt University in Nashville, Tennessee. In 2000, he was also named a professor of physics, in 2001 he was appointed associate dean for Research of the Vanderbilt School of Engineering, and from June 2003 through June 2020 he was chair of the llElectrical engineering and computer science department. He is associated with The Radiation Effects and Reliability Group at Vanderbilt which is the largest of its type at any US university. and Institute for Space and Defense Electronics. His research interests are Effects of ionizing radiation on microelectronic devices and materials, Flicker noise in semiconductors, radiation hardness assurance test methods for mission-critical equipments, radiation effects modeling and simulation and novel microelectronic materials. Fleetwood is the author of more than 600 publications on radiation effects in microelectronics, defects in semiconductor devices, and low-frequency noise. These papers have been cited more than 30,000 times (citation h factor = 93, per Google Scholar). He was named an honorary professor of the Shanghai Institute of Microsystem and Information Technology, Chinese Academy of Sciences in 2011. He currently serves as Senior Editor, Radiation Effects, of the IEEE Transactions on Nuclear Science and Distinguished Lectures Chair of the IEEE Nuclear and Plasma Sciences Society.

== Awards and honors ==
- Fellow, Institute of Electrical and Electronics Engineers, American Physical Society, and American Association for the Advancement of Science
- Merit Award, IEEE Nuclear and Plasma Sciences Society, 2009
- Distinguished Science Alumnus, Purdue University, 2007
- Discover magazine (1998), R&D Magazine R&D 100 (1997) and IndustryWeek magazine Technology of Year (1997) Awards
- More than 20 Outstanding/Meritorious Conference Paper Awards for IEEE Conferences
- Distinguished Member of the technical staff, Sandia National Laboratories, 1990–1999
- Lark-Horovitz Award, Purdue University, 1984

== Other achievements ==
Fleetwood became the eighth US Correspondence Chess Grandmaster in 2008, beating Poland's SM Maciej Jedrzejowski. His chess talent was recognized when he captured the ACUI Midwest regional Collegiate Chess Championship in 1981 and then the United States Chess Federation's premier correspondence tournament, the 1993 Absolute Championship. He is co-winner of the 33rd World Championship of the International Correspondence Chess Federation (ICCF).
