= Mini JOD =

1994 French one-design sailboat

Development
- Designer: Daniel Andrieu
- Location: France
- Year: 1994
- Builder: Jeanneau
- Role: Racer
- Name: Mini JOD

Boat
- Crew: one or two
- Displacement: 419 lb (190 kg)
- Draft: 2.62 ft (0.80 m) with keel down

Hull
- Type: monohull
- Construction: fiberglass
- LOA: 15.75 ft (4.80 m)
- LWL: 13.78 ft (4.20 m)
- Beam: 3.12 ft (0.95 m)

Hull appendages
- Keel: lifting keel, with weighted bulb
- Rudder: spade-type rudder

Rig
- Rig type: Bermuda rig

Sails
- Sailplan: fractional rigged sloop masthead sloop
- Mainsail area: 50.59 sq ft (4.700 m^{2})
- Jib/genoa area: 26.91 sq ft (2.500 m^{2})
- Spinnaker area: 132.40 sq ft (12.300 m^{2})
- Upwind sail area: 77.50 sq ft (7.200 m^{2})
- Downwind sail area: 182.99 sq ft (17.000 m^{2})

The Mini JOD is a sailboat that was designed as a one design racer and first built in 1994.

The boat is a scaled down development of the Andrieu 1991 JOD 35 (Jeanneau One Design 35).

== Production ==
The design was built by Jeanneau in France, starting in 1994, but it is now out of production.

== Design ==
The Mini JOD is a very small and light racing keelboat, built predominantly of fiberglass. It has a fractional sloop rig, with two sets of unswept spreaders and aluminum spars with continuous stainless steel wire rigging and a roller furling jib. There is a retractable aluminum bowsprit. The hull has a nearly plumb stem, a reverse transom, an internally mounted spade-type rudder controlled by a wheel and a lifting keel with a weighted bulb. It displaces 419 lb (190 kg) and has a maximum crew weight of 265 lb (120 kg) allowing crewing by one adult and one child.

The boat has a draft of 2.62 ft (0.80 m) with the keel extended and 1.18 ft (0.36 m) with it retracted, allowing operation in shallow water or ground transportation on a trailer.

For sailing downwind the design may be equipped with an asymmetrical spinnaker of 132.40 sq ft (12.300 m^{2}), flown from the retractable bowsprit.

The design has a hull speed of 4.97 kn (9.20 km/h).
