= List of highways numbered 36 =

The following highways are numbered 36:

== International ==
- E36 European route E36

== Australia ==
- City Road, Sydney
- Domain Highway, Tasmania
- Arnhem Highway

== Canada ==
- Alberta Highway 36
- Ontario Highway 36
- Saskatchewan Highway 36

== China ==
- G36 Expressway

== Costa Rica ==
- National Route 36

== Czech Republic ==
- I/36 Highway; Czech: Silnice I/36

== France ==
- A36 autoroute

== Greece ==
- EO36 road

== Iceland ==
- Route 36 (Iceland)

== India ==
- National Highway 36 (India)

== Iran ==
- Road 36

== Italy ==
- Autostrada A36
- State road 36

== Japan ==
- Japan National Route 36

== Malaysia ==
- Penang Bridge
- FT 36 Second East–West Highway

== New Zealand ==
- New Zealand State Highway 36

== Korea, South ==
- National Route 36

== Thailand ==
- National Highway 36

== United Kingdom ==
- British A36 (Bath-Southampton)

== United States ==
- Interstate 36 (former proposal)
- U.S. Route 36
- Alabama State Route 36
  - County Route 36 (Lee County, Alabama)
- Arkansas Highway 36
- California State Route 36
  - County Route J36 (California)
- Colorado State Highway 36
- Delaware Route 36
- Florida State Road 36 (pre-1945) (former)
- Georgia State Route 36
  - Georgia State Route 36 (1919–1941) (former)
- Hawaii Route 36
  - Hawaii Route 36A
- Idaho State Highway 36
- Illinois Route 36 (former)
- Iowa Highway 36 (former)
  - County Road E36 (Linn County, Iowa)
  - County Road W36 (Linn County, Iowa)
- Kentucky Route 36
- Louisiana Highway 36
- Maryland Route 36
- Massachusetts Route 36
- M-36 (Michigan highway)
- Minnesota State Highway 36
  - County Road 36 (Chisago County, Minnesota)
  - County Road 36 (Hennepin County, Minnesota)
  - County Road 36 (Ramsey County, Minnesota)
- Missouri Route 36 (1922) (former)
- Nebraska Highway 36
- Nevada State Route 36 (former)
- New Jersey Route 36
  - County Route 36 (Bergen County, New Jersey)
  - County Route 36 (Monmouth County, New Jersey)
- New Mexico State Road 36
- New York State Route 36
  - New York State Route 36A (former)
  - County Route 36 (Allegany County, New York)
  - County Route 36 (Chautauqua County, New York)
  - County Route 36 (Chemung County, New York)
  - County Route 36 (Dutchess County, New York)
  - County Route 36 (Genesee County, New York)
  - County Route 36 (Greene County, New York)
  - County Route 36 (Jefferson County, New York)
  - County Route 36 (Livingston County, New York)
    - County Route 36A (Livingston County, New York)
  - County Route 36 (Montgomery County, New York)
  - County Route 36 (Niagara County, New York)
  - County Route 36 (Ontario County, New York)
  - County Route 36 (Orange County, New York)
  - County Route 36 (Putnam County, New York)
  - County Route 36 (Rensselaer County, New York)
  - County Route 36 (Rockland County, New York)
  - County Route 36 (Saratoga County, New York)
  - County Route 36 (Schenectady County, New York)
  - County Route 36 (Steuben County, New York)
  - County Route 36 (Suffolk County, New York)
- North Carolina Highway 36 (former)
- North Dakota Highway 36
- Ohio State Route 36 (1923) (former)
- Oklahoma State Highway 36
  - Oklahoma State Highway 36A (former)
- Oregon Route 36
- Pennsylvania Route 36
- South Carolina Highway 36 (former)
- South Dakota Highway 36
- Tennessee State Route 36
- Texas State Highway 36
  - Texas State Highway Loop 36
  - Farm to Market Road 36
  - Texas Park Road 36
- Utah State Route 36
- Vermont Route 36
- Virginia State Route 36
  - Virginia State Route 36 (1923-1933) (former)
- West Virginia Route 36
- Wisconsin Highway 36
- Wyoming Highway 36

Territories

- Puerto Rico Highway 36

== See also ==
- A36 (disambiguation)#Roads

Preceded by 35	Lists of highways 36	Succeeded by 37
