= List of highways numbered 35 =

The following highways are numbered 35:

== International ==
- E35 European route E35

== Canada ==
- Alberta Highway 35
- British Columbia Highway 35
- Ontario Highway 35
- Quebec Autoroute 35
- Saskatchewan Highway 35

== China ==
- G35 Expressway

== Costa Rica ==
- National Route 35

== Czech Republic ==
- part of D35 Motorway
- part of I/35 Highway; Czech: Silnice I/35

== Greece ==
- EO35 road

== Iceland ==
- Route 35 (Iceland)

== India ==
- NH 35

== Iran ==
- Road 35

== Israel ==
- Highway 35 (Israel)

== Italy ==
- Autostrada A35
- State road 35

== Japan ==
- Japan National Route 35
- E35 Nishi-Kyushu Expressway

== Jordan ==
- Highway 35

== Korea, South ==
- Expressway 35
  - Tongyeong–Daejeon Expressway
  - Jungbu Expressway
- National Route 35

== Malaysia ==
- Guthrie Corridor Expressway
- FT 35 Malaysia Federal Route 35

== Mexico ==
- Mexican Federal Highway 35

== New Zealand ==
- New Zealand State Highway 35

== Pakistan ==
- National Highway 35 (Karakoram Highway)

== Thailand ==
- Highway 35 (Rama II Road)

== United Kingdom ==
- British A35 (Honiton-Southampton)

== United States ==
- Interstate 35
  - Interstate 35E, multiple roads
  - Interstate 35W, multiple roads
- U.S. Route 35
- Alabama State Route 35
  - County Route 35 (Lee County, Alabama)
- Arkansas Highway 35
- California State Route 35
  - County Route J35 (California)
- Colorado State Highway 35
- Connecticut Route 35
- Florida State Road 35
  - County Road 35B (Hardee County, Florida)
  - County Road 35 (Marion County, Florida)
- Georgia State Route 35
- Hawaii Route 35 (former)
- Illinois Route 35
- Indiana State Road 35 (former)
- Kentucky Route 35
- Louisiana Highway 35
- Maine State Route 35
- Maryland Route 35
- Massachusetts Route 35
- M-35 (Michigan highway)
- Mississippi Highway 35
- Missouri Route 35 (former)
- Montana Highway 35
- Nebraska Highway 35
  - Nebraska Recreation Road 35B
- Nevada State Route 35 (former)
- New Jersey Route 35
  - County Route 35 (Bergen County, New Jersey)
  - County Route 35 (Ocean County, New Jersey)
  - County Route 35 (Monmouth County, New Jersey)
- New Mexico State Road 35
- New York State Route 35
  - County Route 35 (Chemung County, New York)
  - County Route 35 (Chenango County, New York)
  - County Route 35 (Dutchess County, New York)
  - County Route 35 (Essex County, New York)
  - County Route 35 (Franklin County, New York)
  - County Route 35 (Genesee County, New York)
  - County Route 35 (Greene County, New York)
  - County Route 35 (Livingston County, New York)
  - County Route 35 (Montgomery County, New York)
  - County Route 35 (Niagara County, New York)
  - County Route 35 (Ontario County, New York)
  - County Route 35B (Otsego County, New York)
  - County Route 35 (Putnam County, New York)
  - County Route 35 (Rockland County, New York)
  - County Route 35 (Schoharie County, New York)
  - County Route 35 (St. Lawrence County, New York)
  - County Route 35 (Steuben County, New York)
  - County Route 35 (Suffolk County, New York)
    - County Route 35B (Suffolk County, New York)
    - County Route 35C (Suffolk County, New York)
  - County Route 35 (Ulster County, New York)
  - County Route 35 (Warren County, New York)
  - County Route 35 (Washington County, New York)
  - County Route 35 (Wyoming County, New York)
- North Carolina Highway 35
- North Dakota Highway 35
- Ohio State Route 35 (1923) (former)
- Oklahoma State Highway 35
- Oregon Route 35
- Pennsylvania Route 35
- South Carolina Highway 35
- South Dakota Highway 35
- Tennessee State Route 35
- Texas State Highway 35
  - Texas State Highway Spur 35
  - Farm to Market Road 35
  - Texas Park Road 35
- Utah State Route 35
- Vermont Route 35
- Virginia State Route 35
- Washington State Route 35
- West Virginia Route 35 (1920s) (former)
- Wisconsin Highway 35
- Wyoming Highway 35

Territories

- Puerto Rico Highway 35
- U.S. Virgin Islands Highway 35

== See also ==
- A35 § Roads
- List of highways numbered 35A

Preceded by 34	Lists of highways 35	Succeeded by 36
