= Surprise, Surprise =

Surprise, Surprise may refer to:

== Music ==
- Surprise Surprise (album), by Mezzoforte, 1982
- "Surprise Surprise" (Billy Talent song), 2012
- "Surprise, Surprise (Sweet Bird of Paradox)", a song by John Lennon, 1974
- "Surprise, Surprise", a song by Bruce Springsteen from Working on a Dream, 2009
- "Surprise, Surprise", a song by Caravan from For Girls Who Grow Plump in the Night, 1973
- "Surprise Surprise", a song by Celine Dion from Taking Chances, 2007
- "Surprise, Surprise", a song by the Rolling Stones from The Rolling Stones, Now!
- "Surprise, Surprise", a song by X from See How We Are

== Television ==
- Surprise Surprise (British TV series), a British light entertainment programme
- Surprise Surprise (Australian TV series), an Australian hidden camera show
- Surprise! Surprise! (1972 TV series), an Australian television series
- Surprise Sur Prise, a Canadian TV show
- "Surprise, Surprise" (As Time Goes By), an episode of the British sitcom As Time Goes By

== Other uses ==
- Surprise Surprise (film), a 2009 short film
- Surprise! Surprise! (short story collection), a 1966 series of twelve short stories by Agatha Christie

== See also ==
- Surprise Surprise Gotcha, an Australian television series
- Surprise Surprise Surprise, an album by Miracle Legion
- Surprise Supplies, a live album by Caravan
- Surprise (disambiguation)
