= M34 (keelboat) =

Sailboat class

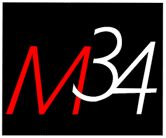

Development
- Designer: Joubert/Nivelt/Mercier
- Location: France
- Year: 2010
- Builder: Archambault Boats
- Role: One-design racer
- Name: M34

Boat
- Displacement: 5,952 lb (2,700 kg)
- Draft: 8.16 ft (2.49 m)

Hull
- Type: monohull
- Construction: fibreglass
- LOA: 34.00 ft (10.36 m)
- LWL: 33.08 ft (10.08 m)
- Beam: 9.75 ft (2.97 m)
- Engine: Volvo 20 hp (15 kW) diesel engine

Hull appendages
- Keel: fin keel with weighted bulb
- Ballast: 2,315 lb (1,050 kg)
- Rudder: internally-mounted spade-type rudder

Rig
- Rig type: Bermuda rig
- I foretriangle height: 43.33 ft (13.21 m)
- J foretriangle base: 13.20 ft (4.02 m)
- P mainsail luff: 45.40 ft (13.84 m)
- E mainsail foot: 15.70 ft (4.79 m)

Sails
- Sailplan: fractional rigged sloop
- Mainsail area: 452 sq ft (42.0 m^{2})
- Jib/genoa area: 312 sq ft (29.0 m^{2})
- Gennaker area: 1,399 sq ft (130.0 m^{2})
- Upwind sail area: 764 sq ft (71.0 m^{2})
- Downwind sail area: 1,851 sq ft (172.0 m^{2})

The M34 is a French sailboat that was designed by Joubert/Nivelt/Mercier as a one-design racer and first built in 2010. The boat was used as the class for the Tour de France à la voile.

== Production ==
The design was built by Archambault Boats in France from 2010 until 2013, but it is now out of production.

== Design ==
The M34 is a racing keelboat, built predominantly of fibreglass with a sandwiched core. It has a 7/8 fractional sloop rig with a carbon fibre keel-stepped mast and fixed bowsprit, and an aluminum boom. The mast has two sets of 20° swept spreaders. The hull has a plumb stem, a raised plumb transom, an internally mounted spade-type rudder controlled by a tiller and a fin keel. It displaces 5,952 lb (2,700 kg) and carries 2,315 lb (1,050 kg) of lead ballast.

The boat has a draft of 8.16 ft (2.49 m) with the standard keel. The keel can be partially raised for ground transportation and gives a draft of 5.92 ft (1.80 m) with it raised.

The boat is fitted with a Swedish Volvo diesel engine of 20 hp (15 kW) with a saildrive for docking and manoeuvring, supplied by a fuel tank with a capacity of 13.2 U.S. gallons (50 L; 11.0 imp gal).

The design has sleeping accommodation for four people, in two cabins. The below decks headroom is 67 in (170 cm)

For sailing downwind the design may be equipped with an asymmetrical spinnaker of 1,399 sq ft (130.0 m^{2}). It has a hull speed of 7.71 kn (14.28 km/h).

== Operational history ==
The boat served as the one-design class for the Tour de France à la voile from 2011 to 2014.

== See also ==
- List of sailing boat types
