= Archambault Grand Surprise =

Sailboat class

Grand Surprise
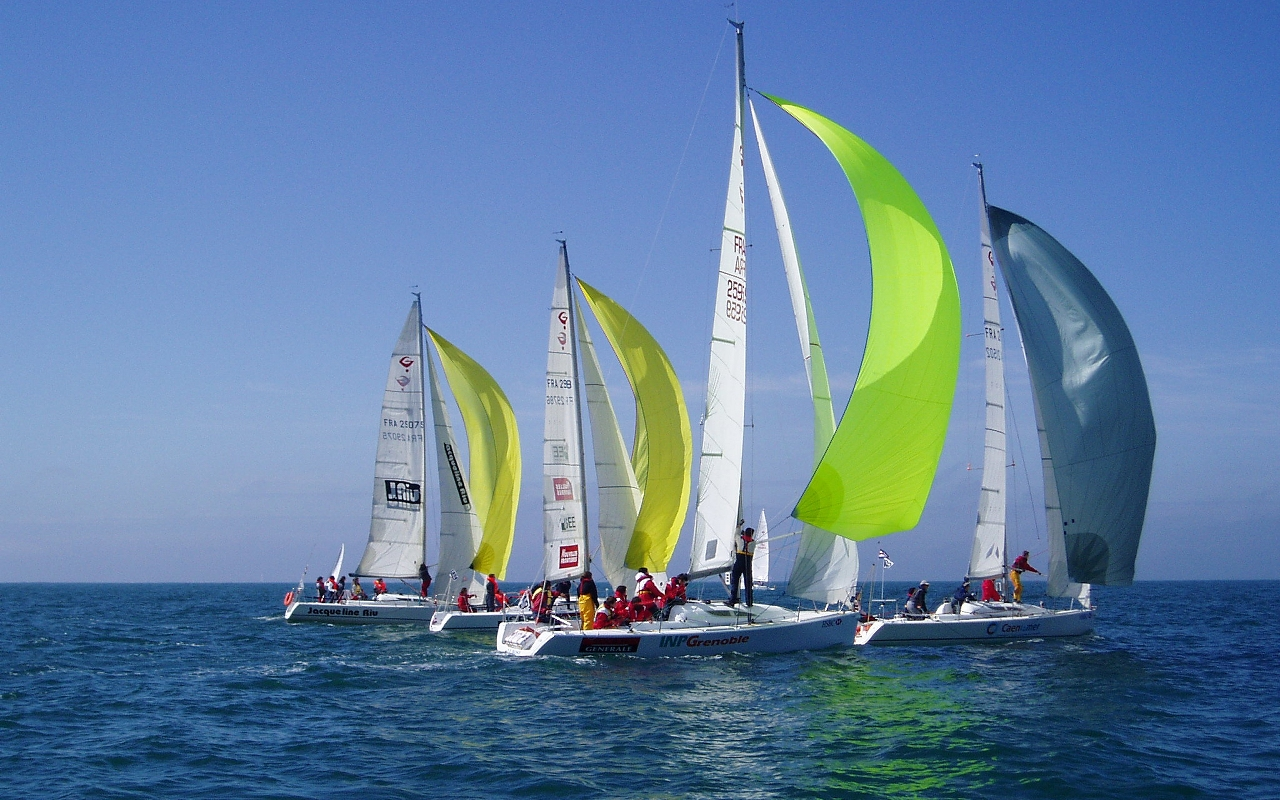
- Four Grand Surprise boats during the 37th Edhec's Regatta at Les Sables-d'Olonne

Development
- Designer: Joubert Nivelt Design
- Location: France
- Year: 1999
- No. built: 110
- Builder: Archambault Boats
- Role: racer
- Name: Grand Surprise

Boat
- Displacement: 5,842 lb (2,650 kg)
- Draft: 6.73 ft (2.05 m)

Hull
- Type: monohull
- Construction: fibreglass
- LOA: 31.30 ft (9.54 m)
- LWL: 29.30 ft (8.93 m)
- Beam: 9.78 ft (2.98 m)
- Engine: Lombardini S.r.l. 14 or 19 hp (10 or 14 kW) diesel engine

Hull appendages
- Keel: fin keel
- Ballast: 2,315 lb (1,050 kg)
- Rudder: internally-mounted spade-type rudder

Rig
- Rig type: Bermuda rig
- I foretriangle height: 40.29 ft (12.28 m)
- J foretriangle base: 11.19 ft (3.41 m)
- P mainsail luff: 43.14 ft (13.15 m)
- E mainsail foot: 14.76 ft (4.50 m)

Sails
- Sailplan: fractional rigged sloop
- Mainsail area: 357 sq ft (33.2 m^{2})
- Jib/genoa area: 245 sq ft (22.8 m^{2})
- Spinnaker area: 1,485 sq ft (138.0 m^{2})
- Gennaker area: 829 sq ft (77.0 m^{2})
- Upwind sail area: 603 sq ft (56.0 m^{2})
- Downwind sail area: 1,843 sq ft (171.2 m^{2})

The Grand Surprise is a French sailboat that was designed by Joubert Nivelt Design as a racer and first built in 1999.

The Grand Surprise followed the smaller 25.10 ft (7.65 m) Surprise, which entered production in 1977.

== Production ==
The design was built by Archambault Boats of Dangé-Saint-Romain and also by the BG Race shipyard in Saint-Malo in France between 1999 and 2017, with 110 boats completed, but it is now out of production. Archambault, which had been founded in 1967, went out of business in 2015. The BG Race shipyard, founded in 2013, built many designs for Archambault and went out of business in 2017.

== Design ==
The Grand Surprise is a racing keelboat, built predominantly of fibreglass. The hull is made from single skin polyester fibreglass, while the deck is a fibreglass polyester sandwich. It has a 7/8 fractional sloop rig with aluminum spars, a keel-stepped mast, wire standing rigging and two sets of swept spreaders. The hull has a plumb stem, an open reverse transom, an internally mounted spade-type rudder controlled by a tiller and a fixed swept fin keel. It displaces 5,842 lb (2,650 kg) and carries 2,315 lb (1,050 kg) of ballast.

The boat has a draft of 6.73 ft (2.05 m) with the standard keel.

The boat is fitted with a Lombardini S.r.l. 14 or 19 hp (10 or 14 kW) diesel engine for docking and manoeuvring. The fuel tank holds 7 U.S. gallons (26 L; 5.8 imp gal).

The design has sleeping accommodation for four to six people, with a double "V"-berth in the bow cabin and two long straight settees in the main cabin. The galley is located on the port side just aft of the bow cabin. The is equipped with a single-burner stove and a sink. A navigation station is opposite the galley, on the starboard side. The head is located under the bow "V"-berth. The main cabin headroom is 65 in (165 cm).

For sailing downwind the design may be equipped with a symmetrical spinnaker of 1,485 sq ft (138.0 m^{2}) or an asymmetrical spinnaker of 829 sq ft (77.0 m^{2}). It has a hull speed of 7.25 kn (13.43 km/h).

== See also ==
- List of sailing boat types
