= Tania Roy =

Indian and American electronics engineer

Tania Roy is an Indian and American electronics engineer whose research involves developing hardware for artificial intelligence, neuromorphic computing, and active-pixel sensors, incorporating unconventional quantum materials including graphene and molybdenum disulfide. She is an associate professor of electrical and computer engineering at Duke University.

== Education and career ==
Roy graduated from BITS Pilani in 2006, with a bachelor's degree in electrical and electronic engineering. She completed a Ph.D. in electrical engineering at Vanderbilt University in 2011. Her dissertation, Reliability-Limiting Defects in GaN/AlGaN High Electron Mobility Transistors, was supervised by Daniel M. Fleetwood.

She became a postdoctoral researcher at Georgia Tech from 2011 to 2013, and at the University of California, Berkeley from 2014 to 2016. After working as an assistant professor at the University of Central Florida from 2016 to 2022, she moved to Duke University in 2023.

== Recognition ==
Roy was a 2025 recipient of the Presidential Early Career Award for Scientists and Engineers. Duke University gave her their 2025–2026 Thomas Langford Lectureship Award.
