= Archambault A40RC =

Sailboat class

Development
- Designer: Joubert Nivelt Design
- Location: France
- Year: 2003
- Builder: Archambault Boats
- Role: Racer-Cruiser
- Name: Archambault A40RC

Boat
- Displacement: 14,661 lb (6,650 kg)
- Draft: 8.14 ft (2.48 m)

Hull
- Type: monohull
- Construction: fibreglass
- LOA: 39.30 ft (11.98 m)
- LWL: 34.58 ft (10.54 m)
- Beam: 12.30 ft (3.75 m)
- Engine: Nanni 29 hp (22 kW) diesel engine

Hull appendages
- Keel: fin keel
- Ballast: 6,834 lb (3,100 kg)
- Rudder: internally-mounted spade-type rudder

Rig
- Rig type: Bermuda rig
- I foretriangle height: 50.88 ft (15.51 m)
- J foretriangle base: 15.42 ft (4.70 m)
- P mainsail luff: 51.77 ft (15.78 m)
- E mainsail foot: 17.55 ft (5.35 m)

Sails
- Sailplan: fractional rigged sloop
- Mainsail area: 549 sq ft (51.0 m^{2})
- Jib/genoa area: 431 sq ft (40.0 m^{2})
- Spinnaker area: 1,442 sq ft (134.0 m^{2})
- Upwind sail area: 980 sq ft (91 m^{2})
- Downwind sail area: 1,991 sq ft (185.0 m^{2})

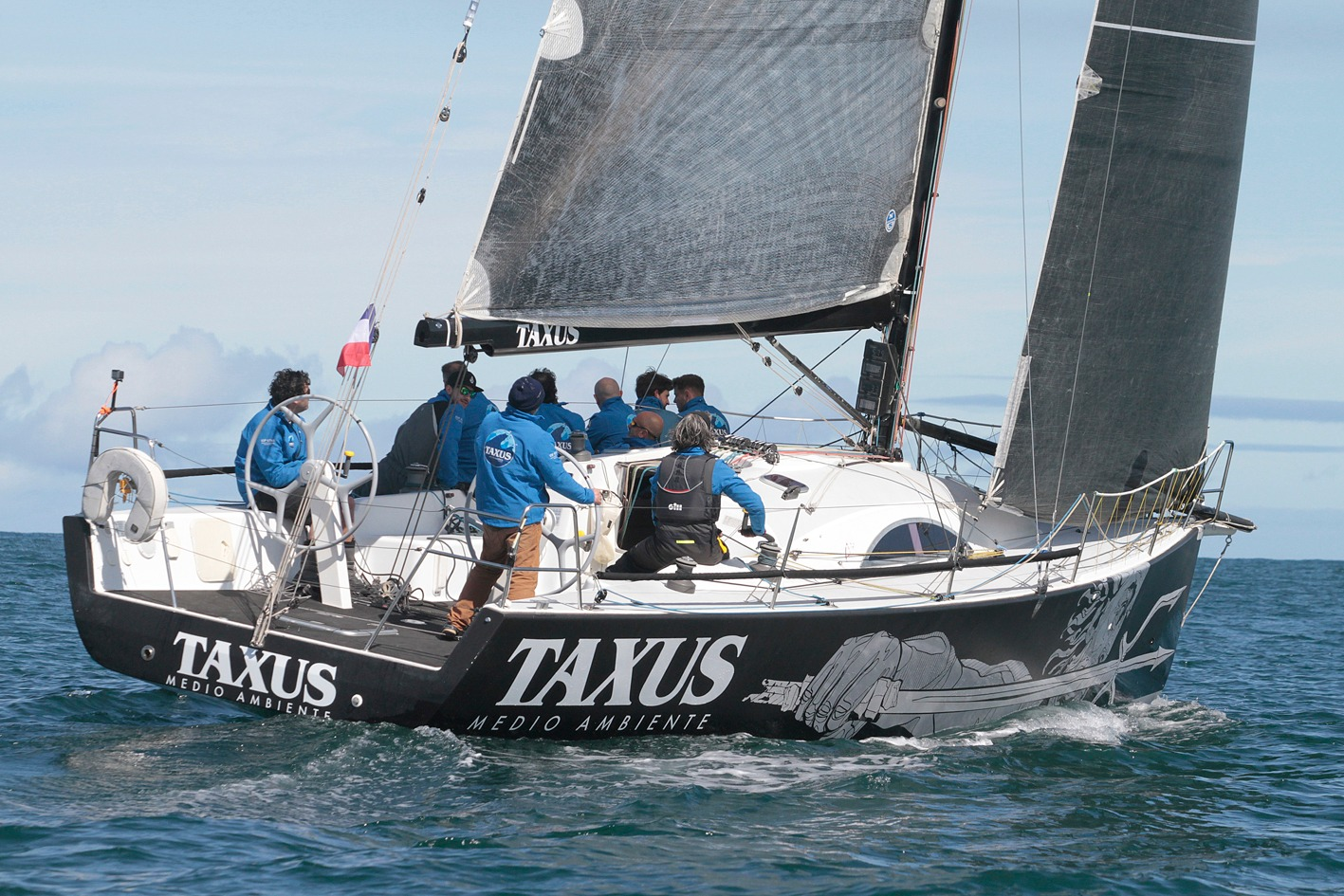
Archambault A40RC

The Archambault A40RC is a French sailboat that was designed by Joubert Nivelt Design as a racer-cruiser.

The boat is a race-orientated version of the Archambault A40 specifically designed to win IRC races.

== Production ==
The design was built by Archambault Boats of Dangé-Saint-Romain and also by the BG Race shipyard in Saint-Malo in France between 2003 (some sources say 2005 or 2009) and 2017, but it is now out of production. Archambault, which had been founded in 1967, went out of business in 2015. The BG Race shipyard, founded in 2013, built many designs for Archambault and went out of business in 2017.

== Design ==
The A40RC is a recreational keelboat, built predominantly of fibreglass. The hull is made from a vacuum-infused PVC polyester fibreglass sandwich, while the deck is a PVC polyester fibreglass sandwich. It has a 9/10 fractional sloop rig, with a masthead spinnaker. The boat has aluminum spars, with carbon fibre spars a factory option. The boat has a keel-stepped mast, dyform wire standing rigging and two sets of swept spreaders. The hull has a plumb stem, an open reverse transom, an internally mounted spade-type rudder controlled by dual wheels and a fixed fin keel. It displaces 14,661 lb (6,650 kg) and carries 6,834 lb (3,100 kg) of lead ballast.

The boat has a draft of 8.14 ft (2.48 m) with the standard keel and 7.22 ft (2.20 m) with the optional shallow draft keel.

The boat is fitted with a Nanni diesel engine of 29 hp (22 kW) for docking and manoeuvring. The fuel tank holds 19.8 U.S. gallons (75 L; 16.5 imp gal), the fresh water tank has a capacity of 26.4 U.S. gallons (100 L; 22.0 imp gal) and the holding tank has a capacity of 13.2 U.S. gallons (50 L; 11.0 imp gal).

The design has sleeping accommodation for eight people, with a double "V"-berth in the bow cabin, two straight settees in the main cabin with a drop leaf table and two aft cabins, each with a double berth. The galley is located on the port side just forward of the companionway ladder. The galley is L-shaped and is equipped with a two-burner stove, a 19.8 U.S. gallons (75 L; 16.5 imp gal) icebox and a sink. A navigation station is opposite the galley, on the starboard side. The head is located just aft of the bow cabin on the starboard side and includes a handheld shower. The main cabin headroom is 79 in (201 cm), while the aft cabin headroom is 71 in (180 cm).

For sailing downwind the design may be equipped with a symmetrical spinnaker of 1,442 sq ft (134.0 m^{2}). It has a hull speed of 7.88 kn (14.59 km/h).

== Operational history ==
In a 2009 Cruising World reviewer Herb McCormick wrote, "to get the most out of the A40RC, a crack team of top sailors was kept very busy. This is an athletic boat. Yes, in little time you could swap the racing headsail foil with a small jib furler, rig lazy jacks on the mainsail, and replace the racing inventory with sturdier canvas to go with a cruising configuration. The loads are light, and the hull is easily driven; an experienced couple could handle the boat quite easily with an autopilot. There's a reason some builders like to call their boats "cruiser/racers," while some choose to word it the other way around. The A40RC definitely puts the emphasis on racer."

In a 2012 review, Toby Heppell reported on the sailing characteristics for Yachts & Yachting, writing, "the boat was simply a pleasure to sail, but not especially easy to get on and drive 100 per cent all the time. It's a 40-footer which will reward reasonably accomplished helms and good crews, which is not to say it is a hard boat to sail. It feels every centimetre a sweet modern racer-cruiser and, joy-of-joys, with everything set up perfectly for the racecourse it was a delight."

== See also ==
- List of sailing boat types
