= List of highways numbered 40A =

The following highways are numbered 40A:

== United States ==
- County Road 40A (Levy County, Florida)
- County Route 40A (Monmouth County, New Jersey)
- New York State Route 40A (former)
  - County Route 40A (Dutchess County, New York)
  - County Route 40A (Steuben County, New York)
  - County Route 40A (Suffolk County, New York)
- Oklahoma State Highway 40A
- South Dakota Highway 40A (former)

== See also ==
- List of highways numbered 40
