= HMS Surprise =

HMS Surprise or Surprize is the name of several ships. These include:

== British Royal Navy ==
Thirteen ships of the British Royal Navy have been named HMS Surprise or HMS Surprise, including:

- HMS Surprize (1746), a 20-gun sixth rate launched in 1746 and sold in 1770.
- HMS Surprize (1774), a 28-gun sixth rate launched in 1774 and sold in 1783.
- HMS Surprize, an 18-gun sloop, formerly the American privateer Bunker Hill, of Salem, captured on 23 December 1778 at Grand Cul De Sac Bay, Saint Lucia and sold in 1783. The French may have purchased her with her becoming the Surprise that was broken up at Rochefort in 1789.
- HMS Surprize (1780), a 10-gun cutter purchased in 1780 and sold in 1786.
- HMS Surprize (1786), a 10-gun cutter purchased in 1786 and sold in 1792.
- HMS Surprise (1796), originally the French corvette Unité, launched in 1794, captured in 1796 by HMS Inconstant; the Royal Navy reclassified her as a sixth-rate frigate. She was sold in 1802. This is the ship featured in the Aubrey–Maturin series.
- HMS Surprise (1812), a 38-gun frigate, previously named Jacobs and launched in 1812. She was hulked as a prison ship in 1822 and sold in 1837.
- HMS Surprise (1814), a 2-gun schooner on the Canadian Lakes. She was formerly the US Tigress, captured in 1814 and listed in service until 1832.
- HMS Surprise (1856), a wooden Vigilant-class screw gunvessel, launched in 1856 and broken up in 1866.
- HMS Surprise (1885), a despatch vessel launched in 1885. She was renamed HMS Alacrity in 1913 and was sold in 1919.
- HMS Surprise (1896), a luxury yacht built in 1896 by Ailsa Shipbuilding for a wealthy Philadelphia banker. Was the Royal Yacht of King Leopold II of Belgium 1899–1909, Later in Russian Navy service as Razsvet. Seized from Russia in 1918 and commissioned as a dispatch vessel. She was named Surprise in 1920. She was sold in 1923 but returned to service in 1939 and was renamed HMS Surprise. She caught fire and sank off Lagos Harbor in 1942.
- HMS Surprise (1916), a Yarrow later M-class destroyer launched in 1916 and sunk in 1917.
- HMS Surprise (K346), a Bay-class frigate. She had been laid down as HMS Loch Carron but was renamed HMS Gerrans Bay in 1944 before being launched in 1945. She was renamed HMS Surprise and used as a despatch vessel later that year, she was HMY at the 1953 Coronation Review of the Fleet and was later broken up in 1965.

== Other ships ==
- HMS Surprise (replica ship), a modern replica of the 18th century Royal Navy frigate HMS Rose, modified to represent the 1796 HMS Surprise in the film Master and Commander: The Far Side of the World, and now owned by the San Diego Maritime Museum.

== See also ==
- Naval and merchant ships named Surprise, disambiguation
- HMS Surprise (novel), the third novel in the Aubrey-Maturin series by Patrick O'Brian.
