= Surprise 25 =

Sailboat class

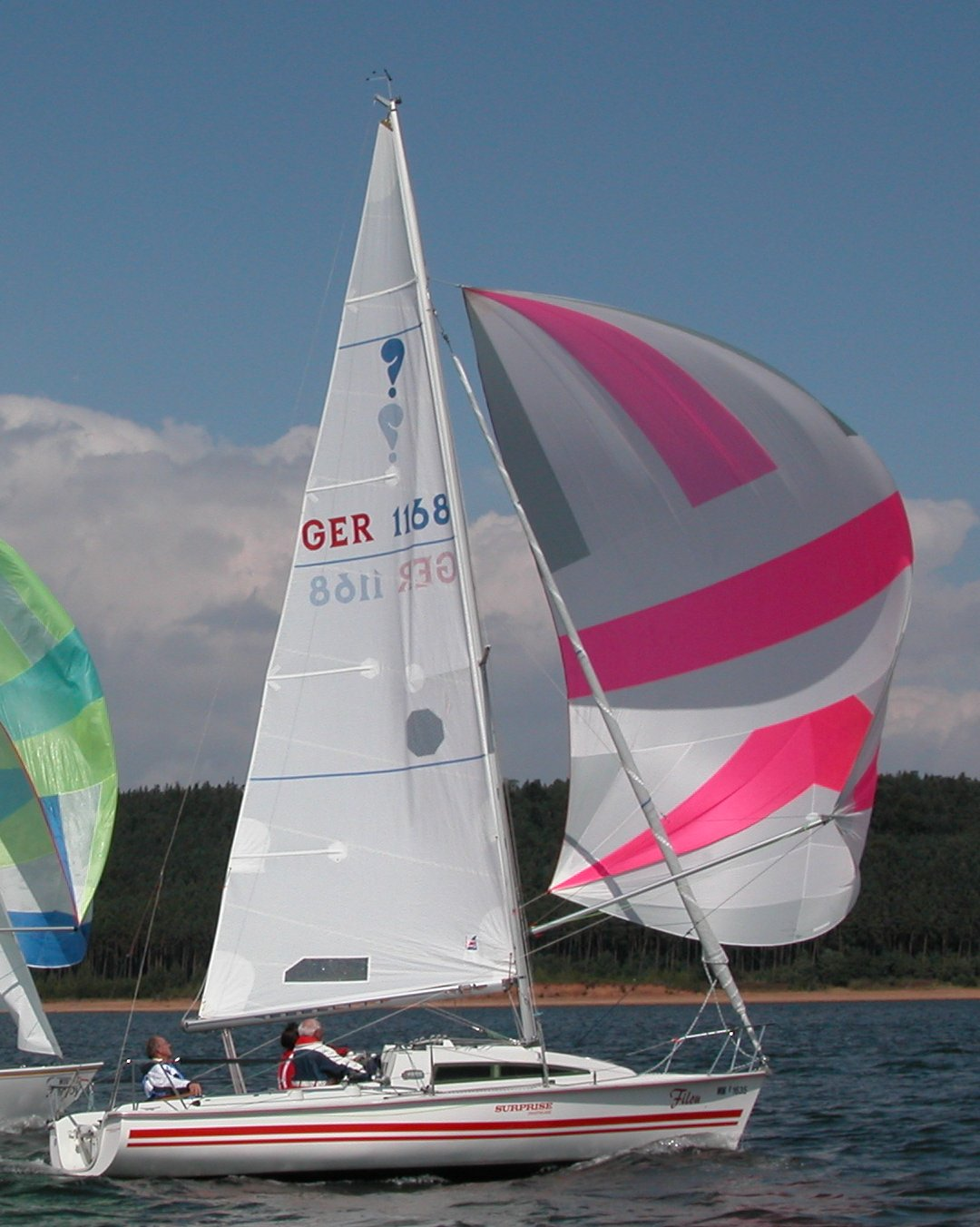

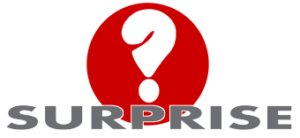

Development
- Designer: Michel Joubert of Joubert Nivelt Design
- Location: France
- Year: 1977
- No. built: 1,550
- Builder: Archambault Boats
- Role: one-design racer

Boat
- Displacement: 2,756 lb (1,250 kg)
- Draft: 5.25 ft (1.60 m)

Hull
- Type: monohull
- Construction: fibreglass
- LOA: 25.10 ft (7.65 m)
- LWL: 21.65 ft (6.60 m)
- Beam: 8.14 ft (2.48 m)
- Engine: Outboard motor 10 hp (7 kW) gasoline engine

Hull appendages
- Keel: fin keel
- Ballast: 1,102 lb (500 kg)
- Rudder: internally-mounted spade-type rudder

Rig
- Rig type: Bermuda rig
- I foretriangle height: 26.41 ft (8.05 m)
- J foretriangle base: 6.00 ft (1.83 m)
- P mainsail luff: 29.53 ft (9.00 m)
- E mainsail foot: 10.83 ft (3.30 m)

Sails
- Sailplan: fractional rigged sloop
- Mainsail area: 178 sq ft (16.5 m^{2})
- Jib/genoa area: 108 sq ft (10.0 m^{2})
- Spinnaker area: 484 sq ft (45.0 m^{2})
- Other sails: Genoa: 151 sq ft (14.0 m^{2})
- Upwind sail area: 328 sq ft (30.5 m^{2})
- Downwind sail area: 662 sq ft (61.5 m^{2})

The Surprise 25, is a one-design racer first built in 1977, designed by Michel Joubert of Joubert Nivelt Design.

The Surprise 25 was followed in production by the larger 31.30 ft (9.54 m) Grand Surprise in 1999.

== Production ==
The design was built by Archambault Boats of Dangé-Saint-Romain and also by the BG Race shipyard in Saint-Malo in France between 1977 and 2017, with 1,550 boats completed, but it is now out of production. Archambault, which had been founded in 1967, went out of business in 2015. The BG Race shipyard, founded in 2013, built many designs for Archambault and went out of business in 2017.

== Design ==
The Surprise 25 is a recreational keelboat, built predominantly of fibreglass. The hull is solid fibreglass and the deck is balsa-cored fibreglass. It has a 7/8 fractional sloop rig with aluminum spars, a deck-stepped mast, wire standing rigging and a single set of swept spreaders. The hull has a raked stem, a slightly reverse transom with an inset, an internally mounted spade-type rudder controlled by a tiller with a "D"-handle extension. It was delivered with a choice of a fixed fin keel, twin asymmetrical keels with bulb weights, or a swing keel. It displaces 2,756 lb (1,250 kg) and carries 1,102 lb (500 kg) of cast iron ballast.

The fin keel-equipped version of the boat has a draft of 5.25 ft (1.60 m), the twin keel-equipped version of the boat has a draft of 3.33 ft (1.01 m), while the swing keel-equipped version has a draft of 5.17 ft (1.58 m) with the keel extended and 2.58 ft (0.79 m) with it retracted, allowing ground transportation on a trailer.

The boat is normally fitted with a small outboard motor of up to 10 hp (7 kW) for docking and manoeuvring.

The design has sleeping accommodation for four people, with a "V"-berth in the bow cabin and two straight settees in the main cabin. The main cabin headroom is 58 in (147 cm).

For sailing downwind the design may be equipped with a symmetrical spinnaker of 484 sq ft (45.0 m^{2}). It has a hull speed of 6.24 kn (11.56 km/h).

== Operational history ==
The boat is supported by an active class club that organizes racing events, the Aspro Surprise (Association Des Propriétaires Surprise, English:Surprise Owners Association).

== See also ==
- List of sailing boat types
- AsproSurprise
