= Archambault A35R =

Sailboat class

Development
- Designer: Joubert Nivelt Design
- Location: France
- Year: 2014
- Builders: Archambault Boats; BG Race
- Role: Racer-Cruiser
- Name: Archambault A35R

Boat
- Displacement: 9,811 lb (4,450 kg)
- Draft: 7.17 ft (2.19 m)

Hull
- Type: monohull
- Construction: fibreglass
- LOA: 36.3 ft (11.1 m)
- LWL: 30.18 ft (9.20 m)
- Beam: 11.58 ft (3.53 m)
- Engine: inboard 21 hp (16 kW) diesel engine

Hull appendages
- Keel: fin keel
- Ballast: 4,630 lb (2,100 kg)
- Rudder: internally-mounted spade-type rudder

Rig
- Rig type: Bermuda rig
- I foretriangle height: 44.5 ft (13.6 m)
- J foretriangle base: 13.5 ft (4.1 m)
- P mainsail luff: 45.0 ft (13.7 m)
- E mainsail foot: 15.67 ft (4.78 m)

Sails
- Sailplan: fractional rigged sloop
- Mainsail area: 409 sq ft (38.0 m^{2})
- Jib/genoa area: 318 sq ft (29.5 m^{2})
- Spinnaker area: 883 sq ft (82.0 m^{2})
- Gennaker area: 1,023 sq ft (95.0 m^{2})
- Upwind sail area: 727 sq ft (67.5 m^{2})
- Downwind sail area: 1,432 sq ft (133.0 m^{2})

The Archambault A35R and Archambault A35RC are a series of French sailboats that were designed by Joubert Nivelt Design as racer-cruisers and first built in 2014.

The Archambault A35R is often confused with the 2006 Archambault A35, which it succeeded in production.

== Production ==
The design was built by Archambault Boats of Dangé-Saint-Romain and also by the BG Race shipyard in Saint-Malo in France between 2014 and 2017, but it is now out of production. Archambault, which had been founded in 1967, went out of business in 2015. The BG Race shipyard, founded in 2013, built many designs for Archambault and went out of business in 2017.

== Design ==
The Archambault A35R is a racing keelboat, built predominantly of polyester sandwich construction fibreglass, with the deck from a PVC vinylester fibreglass sandwich. It has a 9/10 fractional sloop rig with a masthead spinnaker. It has carbon fibre spars, including a fixed bowsprit. The mast is keel-stepped and has two sets of swept spreaders. The hull has a plumb stem, an open reverse transom, an internally mounted spade-type rudder controlled by a tiller and a fixed fin keel. Dual rudders and wheel steering were factory options. It displaces 9,811 lb (4,450 kg) and carries 4,630 lb (2,100 kg) of lead ballast.

The boat has a draft of 7.17 ft (2.19 m) with the standard keel.

For sailing downwind the design may be equipped with a symmetrical spinnaker of 883 sq ft (82.0 m^{2}) or an asymmetrical spinnaker of 1,023 sq ft (95.0 m^{2}). The mainsheet traveller is located on the deck, just aft of the rudder post. It has a hull speed of 7.37 kn (13.65 km/h).

The boat is fitted with an inboard 21 hp (16 kW) diesel engine for docking and manoeuvring. The fuel tank holds 7.9 U.S. gallons (30 L; 6.6 imp gal) and the fresh water tank has a capacity of 26.4 U.S. gallons (100 L; 22.0 imp gal).

The design has sleeping accommodation for six people, with a double "V"-berth in the bow cabin, two straight settees in the main cabin around a drop leaf table and an aft cabin with a double berth on the port side. The galley is located on the port side just forward of the companionway ladder. The galley is L-shaped and is equipped with a two-burner stove and a sink. A navigation station is opposite the galley, on the starboard side. The head is located just aft of the navigation station on the starboard side. The main and aft cabin headroom is 73 in (185 cm).

When equipped with twin wheels and a redesigned interior, the boat is known as the Archambault A35RC.

== See also ==
- List of sailing boat types
