= USS Surprise =

USS Surprise may refer to the following ships operated by the United States:

- Surprise (1777 ship) was a sloop of the Continental Navy purchased in 1777.
- USS Surprise was a brig built in 1814 and renamed USS Eagle later that year
- USS Surprise (1815) was a ketch purchased in 1815 that served until 1820
- USS Surprise (PG-63) was a patrol gunboat purchased from the British Royal Navy in 1942 and decommissioned in 1945
- USS Surprise (PG-97) was a patrol gunboat commissioned in 1969, decommissioned in 1973, and loaned to the Turkish Navy in 1973, where she served as Bora until 2000
