= A36 =

A36, A 36 or A-36 may refer to:

== Aircraft ==
- A-36 Halcon, a variant of Spanish CASA C-101 fighter aircraft
- North American A-36 Apache, a 1942 American ground-attack/dive bomber aircraft
- Aeroprakt A-36 Vulcan, a light twin-engined aircraft from Ukraine
- Beechcraft A36 Bonanza, a variant of the Beechcraft Bonanza aircraft
- Saab A 36, also known as Projekt 1300, a nuclear strike bomber

== Roads ==
- A36 road, England, connects Southampton and Bath
- A36 autoroute, France, a road connecting the German border with Burgundy
- Bundesautobahn 36, Germany, in Lower Saxony and Saxony-Anhalt
- A36 road (Isle of Man), a road connecting the A7 Ballasalla and Port Erin
- A36 road (Northern Ireland), a road in County Antrim connecting Ballymena and Larne
- Autovía A-36, Spain, connects Xativá and Alcoy
- A36 road (Sydney), Australia, mostly follows the course of the Princes Highway between Kogarah and Glebe

== Other uses ==
- A36 (rapper), a Swedish hip hop artist
- A36 steel, a standard alloy specification for structural steel
- HLA-A36, a human serotype
- Samsung Galaxy A36 5G, a mid-range Android-based smartphone
- A36, English Opening code in the Encyclopedia of Chess Openings
