= JOD 35 =

Sailboat class

Jeanneau One Design 35
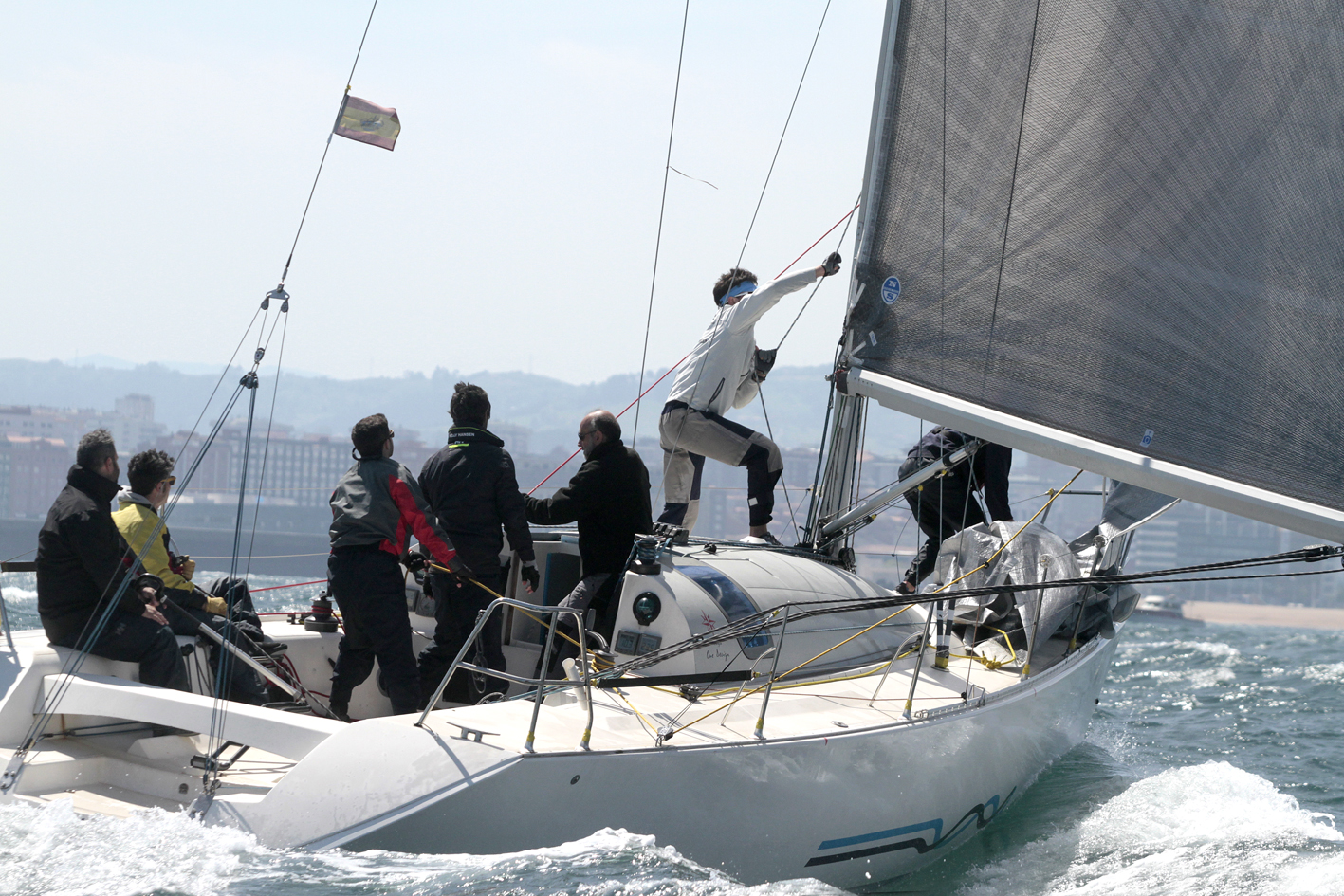

Development
- Designer: Daniel Andrieu
- Location: France
- Year: 1991
- No. built: 240
- Builder: Jeanneau
- Role: Racer
- Name: Jeanneau One Design 35

Boat
- Displacement: 8,070 lb (3,660 kg)
- Draft: 6.40 ft (1.95 m)

Hull
- Type: monohull
- Construction: fiberglass
- LOA: 34.76 ft (10.59 m)
- LWL: 29.69 ft (9.05 m)
- Beam: 11.48 ft (3.50 m)
- Engine: Yanmar 18 hp (13 kW) diesel engine

Hull appendages
- Keel: fin keel with weighted bulb
- Ballast: 2,750 lb (1,247 kg)
- Rudder: spade-type rudder

Rig
- Rig type: Bermuda rig
- I foretriangle height: 39.37 ft (12.00 m)
- J foretriangle base: 10.83 ft (3.30 m)
- P mainsail luff: 43.15 ft (13.15 m)
- E mainsail foot: 17.39 ft (5.30 m)

Sails
- Sailplan: fractional rigged sloop
- Mainsail area: 448 sq ft (41.6 m^{2})
- Jib/genoa area: 326 sq ft (30.3 m^{2})
- Spinnaker area: 844 sq ft (78.4 m^{2})
- Other sails: storm jib: 65 sq ft (6.0 m^{2})
- Upwind sail area: 774 sq ft (71.9 m^{2})
- Downwind sail area: 1,292 sq ft (120.0 m^{2})

Racing
- PHRF: 78-90

The JOD 35 or Jeanneau One Design 35 is a French sailboat that was designed by Daniel Andrieu as a one design racer and first built in 1991.

The JOD 35 was the one design class boat for the Tour de France à la voile from 1992 to 1998.

== Production ==
The design was built by Jeanneau in France, from 1991 until 1995 with 240 boats completed, but it is now out of production.

== Design ==
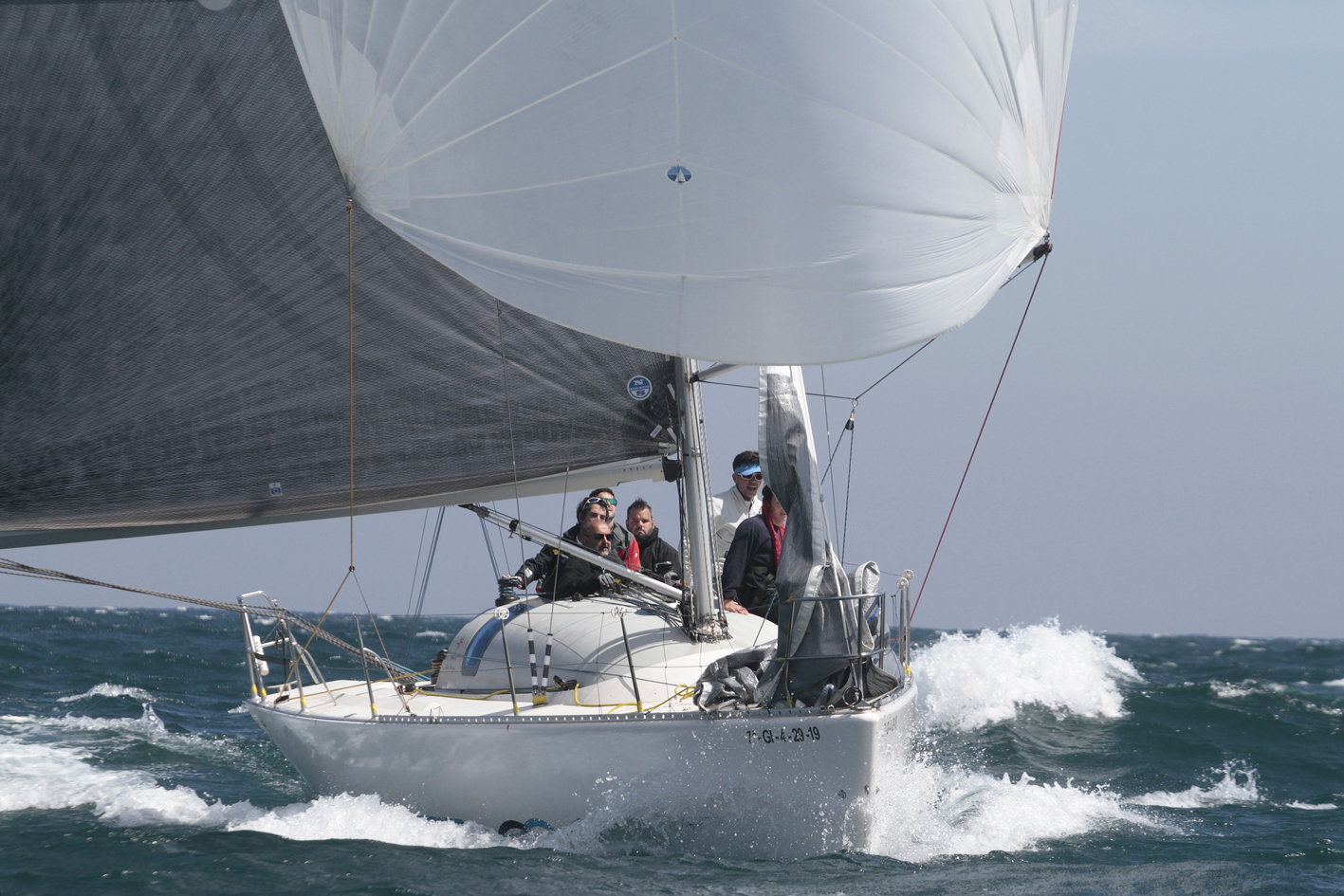
JOD 35

The Jeanneau One Design 35 is a racing keelboat, built predominantly of polyester fiberglass, including a PVC-fiberglass sandwich, with carbon fiber reinforcement. It has a fractional sloop rig, with a keel-stepped mast, two sets of swept spreaders, and aluminum spars with discontinuous stainless steel rod rigging. The hull has a raked stem, a reverse transom with steps, an internally mounted spade-type rudder controlled by a tiller and a fixed fin keel with an L-shaped weighted bulb. It displaces 8,070 lb (3,660 kg) and carries 2,750 lb (1,247 kg) of cast iron ballast.

The boat has a draft of 6.40 ft (1.95 m) with the standard keel.

The boat is fitted with a Japanese Yanmar 2GMF Yanmar 2GM20 diesel engine of 18 hp (13 kW) for docking and maneuvering. The fuel tank holds 14 U.S. gallons (53 L; 12 imp gal) and the fresh water tank has a capacity of 14 U.S. gallons (53 L; 12 imp gal).

The design has sleeping accommodation for six people, with a double "V"-berth in the bow cabin, two straight settee berths in the main cabin two quarter berths aft. The galley is located on the port side just forward of the companionway ladder. The galley is L-shaped and is equipped with a two-burner stove, an ice box and a sink. A navigation station is opposite the galley, on the starboard side. The head is located in the bow cabin under the "V"-berth. Cabin maximum headroom is 68 in (173 cm).

For sailing downwind the design may be equipped with a symmetrical spinnaker of 844 sq ft (78.4 m^{2}).

The design has a hull speed of 7.30 kn (13.52 km/h) and a PHRF handicap of 78 to 90.

== Operational history ==
Introduced at the Paris Boat Show in 1990, the JOD 35 was selected to succeed the Selection 37 in the Tour de France à la voile in 1992, and was replaced by the Mumm 30 for 1999. It was also the boat used in the ACI Match Race Cup in Croatia.

During its time as the Tour de France à la voile boat, it was supported by that organization as a one-design class.

== See also ==
- List of sailing boat types
