= Jean-Jacques Herbulot =

French sailor

Jean-Jacques Herbulot (pronounced [ʒɑ̃ ʒak ɛʁbylo]; 29 March 1909 – 22 July 1997) was a French sailor and competitor in sailing at the Summer Olympics. He was also a noted naval architect and designed many sailboats.

== Early life and education ==
Herbulot was born in Belval, Ardennes in France. His formal education was as an architect and he earned a Diplôme d'Ingénieur. However, he soon turned his attention to sailboat design instead.

== Design career ==
Herbulot started designing boats in 1947, specializing in sailboats of plywood construction for amateur builders and for sailing schools. He designed over 100 boat types during his design career. He is described by Bruce McArthur as "one of the best known figures in the French sailing world. As a designer, he is responsible for bringing the sport of sailing to those who had never before had the means to participate."

During the 1950s Herbulot also designed a new style of diagonal-cut spinnaker that was widely adopted by racing sailors.

== Olympics ==
Herbulot competed in sailing in the Los Angeles 1932 Summer Olympics and the Kiel 1936 Summer Olympics in the Star class. In the Torquay 1948 Summer Olympics he sailed in the Firefly dinghy class and in the Melbourne 1956 Summer Olympics completed in the 5.5 Metre keelboat class.

== Death ==
Herbulot died on 22 July 1997 in Blois, Loir-et-Cher, France at age 88.

== Boat designs ==
Some of his designs include:

- Herbulot Le Dinghy - 1948
- Herbulot Grondin - 1948
- Herbulot Vaurien - 1951
- Herbulot Caravelle - 1952
- Herbulot P'Tit Gars - 1953
- Herbulot Corsaire - 1954
- Herbulot Maraudeur - 1958
- Herbulot Milord - 1963
- Herbulot Mousquetaire - 1964
- Oceanix - 1964
- Oceanix TX - 1966
- Flibustier - 1982
- Herbulot Cap Corse - 1959
- Herbulot Cap Horn - 1959
- Herbulot Cap Vert - 1959
- As de Pique - 1962
- As de Trefle - 1962
- Herbulot Boucanier - 1962
- Brick (keelboat) - 1964
- Herbulot Etendard - 1968
- Figaro 5 - 1975
- Figaro 6 - 1982
