= Commodores' Cup =

Biennial amateur team sailing regatta

The Brewin Dolphin Commodores’ Cup is a biennial amateur team sailing regatta first held in 1992. The competition is organised by the Royal Ocean Racing Club consists of a number of events held in the oceans of the Solent, the English Channel and the Isle of Wight. Each team consists of three boats, two of them rated between 1.020 and 1.230 using the IRC rating system and one boat rated above 1.150. As a Corinthian (amateur) event, the boats rated between 1.020 and 1.230 can only have one Category 3 sailor and the boat rated above 1.150 may only have two. The most recent competition was held in 2014 from the 19th to the 26th of July and was won by Ireland.

== 2008 teams ==
For the 2008 event, a total of six nations and 15 teams were competing, two up from the 2006 event.

- France - four teams
- Hong Kong - one team
- (Republic of Ireland) Ireland - two teams
- Spain - one team
- Netherlands - three teams
- United Kingdom - four teams

== 2010 teams ==
In the 2010 Commodores Cup a total of ten teams from five nations competed, with Ireland claiming overall victory.

- 1st overall - (Republic of Ireland) - Ireland - 73.5 points
- 2nd overall - - Hong Kong - 117.5 points
- 3rd overall - - France Blue - 136 points
- 4th overall - - France Yellow - 167 points
- 5th overall - (United Kingdom) - GBR Red - 175 points
- 6th overall - (United Kingdom) - GBR White - 187.5 points
- 7th overall - - South Africa - 202 points
- 8th overall - - France White - 210 points
- 9th overall - - France Red - 233.5 points
- 10th overall - (United Kingdom) - GBR Black - 322 points

The full list of results is available on the Royal Ocean Racing Club website.
