= Tour de France à la voile =

Annual yacht race in France

Tour de France à la voile is an annual yachting race around the coast of France. Inaugurated in 1978, it links the English Channel to the French Riviera and is held in July.

Famous skippers have taken part in the race, including Loïck Peyron and the four time America's Cup winner Russell Coutts. The race is, however, not reserved for professionals, and it also attracts amateurs and students thanks to three distinct rankings.

The race visits around ten harbours along the French coast. It includes one or two day coastal stages - that vary from year to year - as well as intensive regattas at the various ports. The boats are transported by road (trucks) midway through the race from stages held in the Atlantic Ocean to those in the Mediterranean Sea.

== Classes used ==
Each team sails the same type of boat, so that it is a one design competition. Different boats have been used since the creation of the race, as has the balance of the offshore and inshore racing elements. Classes used have been:

Years	Boat type
1978	Écume de mer
1979–1981	First 30
1982–1983	Rush 31
1984–1991	Selection 37
1992–1998	JOD 35
1999–2010	Mumm 30/Farr 30
2011–2014	M34
2015–2019	Diam 24
2023–present	Beneteau Figaro 3

== List of previous winners ==
Year	Boat Type	Boat name	Skipper
1978	Écume de mer	Marseille	François Paillou
1979	First 30	Dunkerque	Joé Setten
1980	First 30	Dunkerque	Damien Savatier
1981	First 30	Dunkerque	Damien Savatier
1982	Rush 31	Marseille	Jean-Paul Mouren
1983	Rush 31	Lanvéoc-Navale	Benoît Caignaert
1984	Selection 37	Europe	Philippe Hanin; Dominique d’Andrimont
1985	Selection 37	Côtes du Nord	Yannick Dupetit
1986	Selection 37	Le Havre	Benoît Caignaert
1987	Selection 37	Sète-Languedoc-Roussillon	Pierre Mas; Bertrand Pacé
1988	Selection 37	Sète-Languedoc-Roussillon	Pierre Mas; Bertrand Pacé
1989	Selection 37	Ronic Saône-et-Loire	Richard Sautieux
1990	Selection 37	Wasquehal	Hans Bousholte; Philippe Delhumeau
1991	Selection 37	La Ciotat	Laurent Delage
1992	JOD 35	Sodifac-Roubaix	Jimmy Pahun; Jean-Pierre Dick
1993	JOD 35	Saint-Quentin-en Yvelines	Thierry Péponnet
1994	JOD 35	Saint-Pierre et Miquelon	Alain Fédensieu
1995	JOD 35	Baume & Mercier – Force EDC-Paris	Bernard Mallaret; Vincent Portugal
1996	JOD 35	Edouard Leclerc – Région SCASO	Vincent Fertin
1997	JOD 35	CSC - Sun Microsystems	Bertrand Pacé; Philippe Guigné
1998	JOD 35	Nantes & Saint-Nazaire - Bouygues Telecom	Luc Pillot
1999	Farr 30	Kateie	Luc Dewulf
2000	Farr 30	Barlo Plastics	Adrian Stead
2001	Farr 30	Virbac - St Raphaël - Générali	Jean-Pierre Dick
2002	Farr 30	Nantes St Nazaire	Pierre-Loïc Bethet
2003	Farr 30	CapSport	Xavier Lecœur; Bernard Mallaret
2004	Farr 30	Bouygues Telecom	Pierre Loïc Berthet
2005	Farr 30	Toulon Provence Méditerranée COYCHyères	Fabien Henry
2006	Farr 30	Région Île de France	Jean-Pierre Nicol
2007	Farr 30	Toulon Provence Méditerranée COYCHyères	Fabien Henry
2008	Farr 30	Courrier Dunkerque	Daniel Souben
2009	Farr 30	Courrier Dunkerque	Daniel Souben
2010	Farr 30	Nouvelle-Calédonie	Bertrand Pacé; Vincent Portugal
2011	M34	Sud de France/Languedoc-Roussillon	Bertrand Pacé; Vincent Portugal
2012	M34	Toulon Provence Méditerranée COYCHyères	Fabien Henry
2013	M34	Groupama 34	Franck Cammas
2014	M34	Courrier Dunkerque 3	Daniel Souben; Erwan Le Roux
2015	Diam 24	Spindrift	Thierry Douillard; Xavier Revil; François Morvan; Matthieu Vandame
2016	Diam 24	Lorina Limonade - Golfe du Morbihan	Matthieu Salomon; Bruno Mouriac; Kevin Pepoonnet; Quentin Ponroy; Quentin Delapierre
2017	Diam 24	Fondation FDJ - Des pieds et des mains	Benjamin Amiot; Damien Iehl; Francois Morvan; Damien Seguin
2018	Diam 24	Lorina Limonade - Golfe du Morbihan	Bruno Mourniac; Tim Mourniac; Quentin Delapierre; Corentin Horeau
2019	Diam 24	Team Beijaflore	Laurent Berjon; Arnaud Jarlegan; Pierre Mas; Julien Villion; Valentin Bellet; Valentin Sipan; Guillaume Pirouelle
2020	Diam 24	Cancelled due to the COVID-19 pandemic.	
2021	Diam 24	Cancelled due to the COVID-19 pandemic.	
2022	Cancelled due to a lack of sponsors.		
2023	Figaro 3	Équipe Bretagne Jeunes Habitable, Paul Morvan56	
2024	Figaro 3	Dunkerque Voile	Arthur Meurisse
2025	Figaro 3		
