= Selection 37 =

Sailboat class

Development
- Designer: Joubert-Nivelt
- Location: France
- Year: 1984
- No. built: 251
- Builder: Jeanneau
- Role: Racer-Cruiser
- Name: Selection 37

Boat
- Displacement: 9,980 lb (4,527 kg)
- Draft: 6.25 ft (1.91 m)

Hull
- Type: monohull
- Construction: fiberglass
- LOA: 37.24 ft (11.35 m)
- LWL: 29.33 ft (8.94 m)
- Beam: 10.67 ft (3.25 m)
- Engine: Yanmar 2GM 18 hp (13 kW) diesel engine

Hull appendages
- Keel: fin keel
- Ballast: 2,422 lb (1,099 kg)
- Rudder: spade-type rudder

Rig
- Rig type: Bermuda rig
- I foretriangle height: 38.92 ft (11.86 m)
- J foretriangle base: 12.10 ft (3.69 m)
- P mainsail luff: 43.47 ft (13.25 m)
- E mainsail foot: 16.40 ft (5.00 m)

Sails
- Sailplan: fractional rigged sloop
- Mainsail area: 395 sq ft (36.7 m^{2})
- Jib/genoa area: 143 sq ft (13.3 m^{2})
- Spinnaker area: 775 sq ft (72.0 m^{2})
- Other sails: genoa: 361 sq ft (33.5 m^{2}) solent: 296 sq ft (27.5 m^{2}) storm jib: 60 sq ft (5.6 m^{2})
- Upwind sail area: 756 sq ft (70.2 m^{2})
- Downwind sail area: 1,170 sq ft (109 m^{2})

The Selection 37 is a French sailboat that was designed by the Joubert-Nivelt design firm, as a racer-cruiser specifically for the Tour de France à la voile and first built in 1984.

The Selection 37 was the one design class boat for the Tour de France à la voile from 1984 to 1991.

== Production ==
The design was built by Jeanneau in France, from 1984 until 1991, with 251 boats completed. It was produced in "owners" and "Royale Tour de France" racing team versions.

== Design ==
The Selection 37 is a racing keelboat, built predominantly of polyester fiberglass, with wood trim. The hull is made from solid fiberglass, with Kevlar optional, while the deck is a fibergalss-balsa sandwich. The boat has a 7/8 fractional sloop rig, with a keel-stepped mast, two sets of unswept spreaders and aluminum spars with 1X19 discontinuous stainless steel wire rigging. The hull has a raked stem, a reverse transom, an internally mounted spade-type rudder controlled by a tiller and a fixed fin keel. It displaces 9,980 lb (4,527 kg) and carries 2,422 lb (1,099 kg) of ballast.

The boat has a draft of 6.25 ft (1.91 m) with the standard keel.

The boat is fitted with a Japanese Yanmar 2GM diesel engine of 18 hp (13 kW) for docking and maneuvering. The fuel tank holds 10 U.S. gallons (38 L; 8.3 imp gal) and the fresh water tank has a capacity of 14 U.S. gallons (53 L; 12 imp gal).

The design has sleeping accommodation for seven people, with a double "V"-berth in the bow cabin, dual straight settees in the main cabin and two aft cabins with double berths. The galley is located on the port side just forward of the companionway ladder and is equipped with a two-burner stove and a sink. A navigation station is opposite the galley, on the starboard side. The head is located to starboard of the companionway. The owner's version also includes a forward main cabin table. Cabin headroom is 71 in (180 cm).

For sailing downwind the design may be equipped with a symmetrical spinnaker of 775 sq ft (72.0 m^{2}).

The design has a hull speed of 7.26 kn (13.45 km/h).

== Operational history ==
During its heyday as the Tour de France à la voile boat it was supported by that organization as a one-design class.

== See also ==
- List of sailing boat types
