= Archambault A35 =

Sailboat class

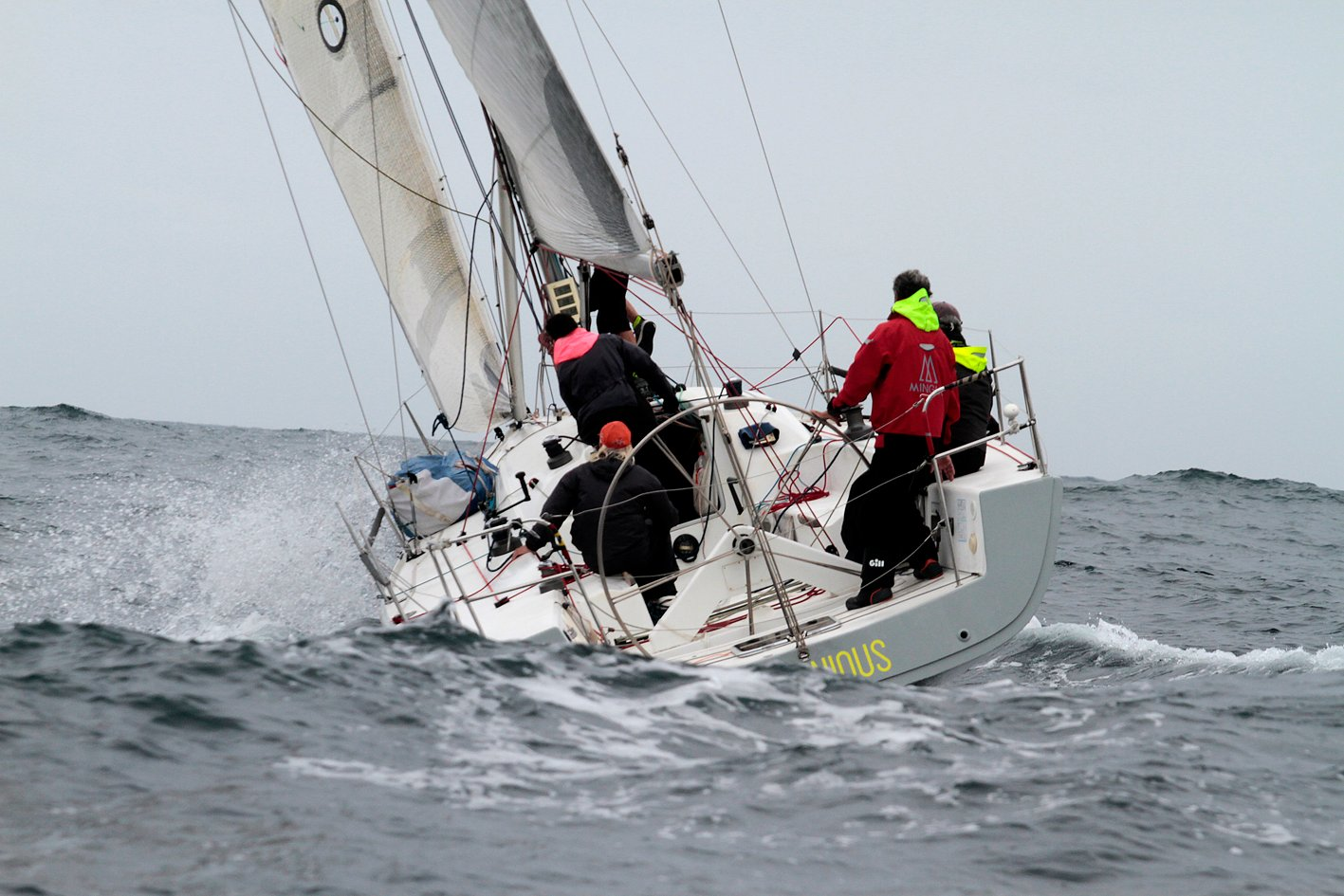

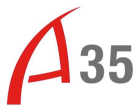

Development
- Designer: Joubert Nivelt Design
- Location: France
- Year: 2006
- Builder: Archambault Boats
- Role: Racer-Cruiser
- Name: Archambault A35

Boat
- Displacement: 9,811 lb (4,450 kg)
- Draft: 6.89 ft (2.10 m)

Hull
- Type: monohull
- Construction: fibreglass
- LOA: 34.74 ft (10.59 m)
- LWL: 30.48 ft (9.29 m)
- Beam: 11.65 ft (3.55 m)
- Engine: Nanni 21 hp (16 kW) diesel engine

Hull appendages
- Keel: fin keel
- Ballast: 4,387 lb (1,990 kg)
- Rudder: internally-mounted spade-type rudder

Rig
- Rig type: Bermuda rig
- I foretriangle height: 44.23 ft (13.48 m)
- J foretriangle base: 13.45 ft (4.10 m)
- P mainsail luff: 45.05 ft (13.73 m)
- E mainsail foot: 15.06 ft (4.59 m)

Sails
- Sailplan: fractional rigged sloop
- Mainsail area: 409 sq ft (38.0 m^{2})
- Jib/genoa area: 318 sq ft (29.5 m^{2})
- Spinnaker area: 833 sq ft (77.4 m^{2})
- Gennaker area: 1,023 sq ft (95.0 m^{2})
- Upwind sail area: 727 sq ft (67.5 m^{2})
- Downwind sail area: 1,432 sq ft (133.0 m^{2})

The Archambault A35 is a French sailboat that was designed by Joubert Nivelt Design as a racer-cruiser and first built in 2006.

The Archambault A35 is often confused with the 2006 Archambault A35R, which succeeded it in production.

== Production ==
The design was built by Archambault Boats in Dangé-Saint-Romain, France between 2006 and 2013, but it is now out of production.

== Design ==
The A35 is a racing keelboat, built predominantly with polyester fibreglass sandwich construction, with wooden trim. It has a 9/10 fractional sloop rig, with a masthead spinnaker. It has aluminum spars, with carbon fibre spars optional, a keel-stepped mast, wire standing rigging and two sets of swept spreaders. The hull has a plumb stem, an open reverse transom, an internally mounted spade-type rudder controlled by a tiller, or optionally dual wheels and a fixed fin keel. It displaces 9,811 lb (4,450 kg) and carries 4,387 lb (1,990 kg) of lead ballast.

The boat has a draft of 6.89 ft (2.10 m) with the standard fin keel.

The boat is fitted with a Nanni 3.21 SD10 diesel engine of 21 hp (16 kW) for docking and manoeuvring. An 18 hp (13 kW) engine was optional. The fuel tank holds 13.2 U.S. gallons (50 L; 11.0 imp gal) and the fresh water tank has a capacity of 26.4 U.S. gallons (100 L; 22.0 imp gal).

The design has sleeping accommodation for six people, with a double "V"-berth in the bow cabin, two straight settees in the main cabin, around a drop leaf table and an aft cabin with a double berth on the port side. The galley is located on the port side just forward of the companionway ladder. The galley is L-shaped and is equipped with a two-burner stove and a sink. A navigation station is opposite the galley, on the starboard side. The head is located just aft of the navigation station on the starboard side. The main cabin has 73 in (190 cm) of headroom. The bow cabin has a single, circular forward hatch for ventilation.

For sailing downwind the design may be equipped with a symmetrical spinnaker of 883 sq ft (82.0 m^{2}) or an asymmetrical spinnaker of 1,023 sq ft (95.0 m^{2}). All lines are led to the cockpit and the mainsheet traveller is located on the deck, just aft of the rudder post.

The boat has a hull speed of 7.37 kn (13.65 km/h).

== Operational history ==
Sailing World named the A35 as the "best crossover boat of 2009", a term referring to a "racer-cruiser", as part of its Boat of the Year award winners.

In a 2008 Sailing World review for Boat of the Year, Tony Bessinger, wrote, "one of the slickest, best-performing boats we've ever sailed in our years with Boat of the Year is the Archambault A35, and the judges collectively described it as one of the best-built, best laid-out boats they've sailed. The design firm, Joubert/Nivelt, certainly knows its stuff, as does this boat's French builder, which recently celebrated 50 years in business."

In a 2018, after a sail in high winds, reviewer Lars Reisberg concluded, "I was amazed by the power and performance, the light effortless steering and the seakind motion of the Archambault A35. The speed was tremendous and I think the boat still has lots of potential to be driven fast in races and to seriously contend with newer yachts for sure."

== See also ==
- List of sailing boat types
