= Surprise Valley =

Surprise Valley may refer to:

- Surprise Valley, Modoc County, California, U.S.
- Surprise Valley, San Bernardino County, California, U.S.
- Surprise Valley, former name of Cedarville, California, U.S.
- Rural Municipality of Surprise Valley No. 9, Saskatchewan, Canada
- "Surprise Valley", a song by Widespread Panic from the 1999 album 'Til the Medicine Takes
