= Archambault A40 =

Sailboat class

Development
- Designer: Joubert Nivelt Design
- Location: France
- Year: 2004
- Builder: Archambault Boats
- Role: Cruiser-Racer
- Name: Archambault A40

Boat
- Displacement: 13,669 lb (6,200 kg) (light)
- Draft: 7.91 ft (2.41 m)

Hull
- Type: monohull
- Construction: fibreglass
- LOA: 39.34 ft (11.99 m)
- LWL: 36.91 ft (11.25 m)
- Beam: 12.34 ft (3.76 m)
- Engine: Volvo Penta D1-30 29 hp (22 kW) diesel engine

Hull appendages
- Keel: fin keel
- Ballast: 5,512 lb (2,500 kg)
- Rudder: internally-mounted spade-type rudder

Rig
- Rig type: Bermuda rig
- I foretriangle height: 53.44 ft (16.29 m)
- J foretriangle base: 14.76 ft (4.50 m)
- P mainsail luff: 49.21 ft (15.00 m)
- E mainsail foot: 18.04 ft (5.50 m)

Sails
- Sailplan: fractional rigged sloop
- Mainsail area: 443.87 sq ft (41.237 m^{2})
- Jib/genoa area: 394.39 sq ft (36.640 m^{2})
- Upwind sail area: 838.26 sq ft (77.877 m^{2})

The Archambault A40, or Archambault 40, is a French sailboat that was designed by Joubert Nivelt Design as a cruiser-racer and first built in 2004.

== Production ==
The design was built by Archambault Boats of Dangé-Saint-Romain, France, starting in 2004, but it is now out of production.

== Design ==
The Archambault A40 is a recreational keelboat, built predominantly of fibreglass. It has a fractional sloop rig. The hull has a plumb stem, an open reverse transom, an internally mounted spade-type rudder controlled by a wheel and a fixed fin keel.

The boat has a draft of 7.91 ft (2.41 m) with the standard keel and is fitted with a Swedish Volvo Penta D1-30 diesel engine of 29 hp (22 kW) for docking and manoeuvring.

The design has sleeping accommodation for eight people, with a double "V"-berth in the bow cabin, two straight settees in the main cabin with a drop leaf table and two aft cabins, each with a double berth. The galley is located on the port side just forward of the companionway ladder. The galley is L-shaped and is equipped with a two-burner stove, a 19.8 U.S. gallons (75 L; 16.5 imp gal) icebox and a sink. A navigation station is opposite the galley, on the starboard side. The head is located just aft of the bow cabin on the starboard side and has a shower.

For sailing downwind the design may be equipped with a symmetrical spinnaker. It has a hull speed of 8.14 kn (15.08 km/h).

== Operational history ==
A review in Yacht and Boat described sailing the design, "the boat is astonishingly easy to control. The steering does not load up at any time; to a degree, steering is an intellectual exercise, not a tactile one. By that I mean that when Glenn calls “pressure coming” and I wait for the helm to tell me that the boat feels the extra breeze, nothing happens. She simply accelerates in a straight line, with no need to wind off helm. It may be a different story in a sea and with tougher gusts; we had smooth seas, but there is never an acute angle of heel, or sudden lurch that upsets the crew. It's a terrible cliche, but this hull really, really is like a big dinghy."

== See also ==
- List of sailing boat types
