= List of highways numbered 35A =

The following highways are numbered 35A:

== Canada ==
- Ontario Highway 35A

== United States ==
- County Road 35A (Pasco County, Florida)
- Nebraska Recreation Road 35A
- New York State Route 35A (former)
  - County Route 35A (Rockland County, New York)
  - County Route 35A (Suffolk County, New York)
