= HLA-A36 =

Human leukocyte antigen serotype

- (MHC Class I, A cell surface antigen)
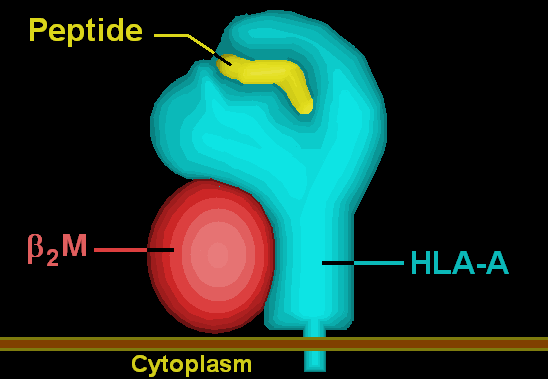
- HLA-A36

About
- Protein: transmembrane receptor/ligand
- Structure: αβ heterodimer
- Subunits: HLA-A*3601, β_{2}-microglobulin

Subtypes
Subtype	allele	Available structures
A36	*3601	
{{{cNick2}}}	*36{{{cAllele2}}}	
{{{cNick3}}}	*36{{{cAllele3}}}	
{{{cNick4}}}	*36{{{cAllele4}}}	
- Alleles link-out to IMGT/HLA database at EBI

HLA-A36 (A36) is a human leukocyte antigen serotype within HLA-A serotype group. The serotype is determined by the antibody recognition of α^{36} subset of HLA-A α-chains. For A36, the alpha "A" chain are encoded by the HLA-A*36 allele group and the β-chain are encoded by B2M locus. This group currently is dominated by A*3601. A36 and A*36 are almost synonymous in meaning.

A36 is more common in Africa (North and East) and Central Asia. A36 is rare HLA-A allele group.

== Serotype ==
A36 recognition of some HLA A*36 gene products
A*36	A36	A1	Sample
allele	%	%	size (N)
*3601	68	16	807

A36 has a high false serotyping rate to A1.

== Distribution ==
HLA A36 frequencies
		freq
ref.	Population	(%)
	Kenya	6.6
	N. African (non-caucasian)	4.5
	Mossi (Burkina Faso)	3.8
	Beti (Cameroon)	3.7
	Mongolian	3.1
	Lusaka (Zambia)	3.1
	Harare Shona (Zimbabwe)	2.9
	Uyghurs (China)	2.6
	Bamileke (Cameroon)	2.6
	Amman (Jordan)	2.4
	Fulani	2.0
	Sweden	1.6
	Tswana (S. Africa)	1.2
	Kampala (Uganda)	1.2
	Spain	0.9
	Bubi (Equatorial Guinea)	0.5
	!Kung (San)	0.0
	Berber (Morocco)	0.0

A36 is largely limited to Africa. Outside Africa, more than half of the populations have no A36 and the majority that do, have only trace levels. The exception is in Central/East Central Asia. This appears not to be coincidental. HLA DR3-DQ2 linkage and frequency indicates a strong possibility of a recent migration from either North or West Africa in which the DR3-DQ2 (notably DRB1*0302) and A*33-B*58 haplotypes were carried into and redistributed from Central Asia into the surrounding populations.
