= List of highways numbered 40 =

The following highways are numbered 40:

== International ==
- European route E40

== Argentina ==
- National Route 40

== Australia ==
- NSW State Route 40 (Windsor Road and Victoria Road in Sydney)
- Victorian State Route 40
- Mulligan Highway (Queensland)

== Brazil ==
- BR-040

== Canada ==
- Alberta Highway 40
- Newfoundland and Labrador Route 40
- Ontario Highway 40
- Quebec Autoroute 40
- Saskatchewan Highway 40

== China ==
- G40 Expressway

== Czech Republic ==
- I/40 Highway; Czech: Silnice I/40

== Greece ==
- EO40 road, an airport road to Agrinion Airport

== Iceland ==
- Route 40 (Iceland)

== India ==
- NH 40

== Ireland ==
- N40 road (Ireland)

== Israel ==
- Highway 40 (Israel)

== Japan ==
- Japan National Route 40

== Jordan ==
- Highway 40

== Korea, South ==
- Pyeongtaek–Jecheon Expressway
- National Route 40

== Saudi Arabia ==
- Highway 40 (Saudi Arabia)

== Sweden ==
- Swedish road 40, formerly Swedish national road 40 connecting Göteborg, Borås, and Jönköping

== Mexico ==
- Mexican Federal Highway 40

== United Kingdom ==
- British A40 (London-Fishguard)
- British M40 (Denham-Earlswood)

== United States ==
- Interstate 40
- U.S. Route 40
  - U.S. Route 40N (former)
  - U.S. Route 40S (former)
- Alabama State Route 40
  - County Route 40 (Tallapoosa County, Alabama)
- Arkansas Highway 40 (former)
- Colorado State Highway 40
- Connecticut Route 40
- Florida State Road 40
  - County Road 40 (Levy County, Florida)
  - County Road 40 (Marion County, Florida)
- Georgia State Route 40
- Hawaii Route 40 (former)
- Idaho State Highway 40
- Illinois Route 40
- Kentucky Route 40
- Louisiana Highway 40
- Massachusetts Route 40
- M-40 (Michigan highway)
- Minnesota State Highway 40
  - County Road 40 (Hennepin County, Minnesota)
  - County Road 40 (Ramsey County, Minnesota)
- Missouri Route 40 (1922) (former)
- Montana Highway 40
- Nebraska Highway 40
  - Nebraska Link 40C
  - Nebraska Link 40G
  - Nebraska Spur 40D
  - Nebraska Recreation Road 40E
- Nevada State Route 40 (1935) (former)
- New Jersey Route 40 (former)
  - County Route 40 (Bergen County, New Jersey)
  - County Route 40 (Monmouth County, New Jersey)
- New Mexico State Road 40 (former)
- New York State Route 40
  - County Route 40 (Allegany County, New York)
  - County Route 40 (Cattaraugus County, New York)
  - County Route 40 (Chenango County, New York)
  - County Route 40 (Dutchess County, New York)
  - County Route 40 (Genesee County, New York)
  - County Route 40 (Greene County, New York)
  - County Route 40 (Madison County, New York)
  - County Route 40 (Niagara County, New York)
  - County Route 40 (Oneida County, New York)
  - County Route 40 (Otsego County, New York)
  - County Route 40 (Putnam County, New York)
  - County Route 40 (Rensselaer County, New York)
  - County Route 40 (Schenectady County, New York)
  - County Route 40 (St. Lawrence County, New York)
  - County Route 40 (Suffolk County, New York)
  - County Route 40 (Ulster County, New York)
- North Carolina Highway 40 (former)
- North Dakota Highway 40
- Ohio State Route 40 (1923-1927) (former)
- Oklahoma State Highway 40 (former)
- South Carolina Highway 40 (former)
- South Dakota Highway 40
- Tennessee State Route 40
  - APD-40
- Texas State Highway 40
  - Texas State Highway Loop 40
  - Farm to Market Road 40
  - Urban Road 40 (signed as Farm to Market Road 40)
  - Texas Park Road 40
- Utah State Route 40 (former)
- Virginia State Route 40
  - Virginia State Route 40 (1923-1933) (former)
- West Virginia Route 40 (1920s) (former)
- Wisconsin Highway 40

Territories

- Puerto Rico Highway 40
- U.S. Virgin Islands Highway 40

== See also ==
- A40 (disambiguation)#Roads
- List of highways numbered 40A

Preceded by 39	Lists of highways 40	Succeeded by 41
