= Surprise, Indiana =

- Unincorporated community
- Location within Indiana Location within the United States
- Coordinates: 38°58′14″N 86°03′32″W
- Country: United States
- State: Indiana
- County: Jackson
- Township: Hamilton
- Elevation: 577 ft (176 m)
- ZIP code: 47274
- FIPS code: 18-74402
- GNIS feature ID: 444436

Surprise is an unincorporated community in Hamilton Township, Jackson County, Indiana.

== History ==
According to tradition, the community was so named from the surprise expressed when the town succeeded in gaining a post office and railroad depot. The Surprise post office closed in 1905.
