= Surprise (1777 ship) =

History

Great Britain
- Name: HMS Race Horse (or Racehorse)
- Acquired: June 1776 by purchase
- Fate: Captured 8 December 1776

Grand Union Flag
- Name: Surprise
- Acquired: 1776
- Commissioned: 1777
- Fate: Destroyed 15 November 1777

General characteristics
- Type: Sloop
- Tons burthen: 98 (bm)
- Length: 59 ft (18.0 m) (overall); 43 ft (13.1 m) (keel)
- Beam: 20 ft 9 in (6.3 m) (overall)
- Depth of hold: 9 ft (2.7 m) (overall)
- Propulsion: Sails
- Armament: 10 × 4-pounder guns

USS Surprise was a 10-gun sloop of the Continental Navy. She was originally the merchantman Hercules which the Royal Navy had purchased in 1776 and renamed HMS Racehorse. USS Andrew Doria captured Racehorse in 1776 and the Americans took her into service as Surprise. Her own crew scuttled Surprise on 15 December 1777 to prevent the Royal Navy from recapturing her.

== HMS Race Horse ==
The Royal Navy purchased the sloop Hercules in June 1776 at Jamaica in the British West Indies. The Navy renamed her Racehorse and commissioned her under Lieutenant Charles Everitt. In August, Lt. James Jones replaced Everitt.

Between 24 November and her capture she captured the sloops L'June Bale, Liberty, and St. Espirit. On 6 December, 1776 Racehorse was off Puerto Rico where she encountered USS Andrew Doria. After a two-hour single-ship engagement Racehorse struck.

== US service ==
The Continental Navy commissioned Race Horse as Surprise under Captain Benjamin Dunn.

Surprise was ordered in April 1777 to join Andrew Doria and the sloop Fly in clearing the Cape May channel of British ships.

On May 2nd, the Harwich packet Prince of Orange was taken in the English Channel by the USS Surprise, Captain Gustavus Conyngham. The latter vessel had been bought at Folkestone, and, with glaring disregard of French neutrality, had been equipped at Dunkirk. On the Surprise's return to Dunkirk, the prize was seized and restored to Britain, though it was believed at the time, not without some reason, that the British Government, anxious to avoid a dispute with France, had purchased from Conyngham his capture.

== Scuttling ==
Surprise was stationed in the Delaware River through the spring and summer of 1777. After British Vice-admiral Lord Howe brought his fleet into the river in September 1777, Surprise was part of the forces charged with defending Philadelphia. Following the British occupation of Fort Mifflin on 16 November, Surprise, with the remaining ships of the Continental Navy, including Andrew Doria, sought shelter under the guns of Fort Mercer at Red Bank, New Jersey. With the evacuation of Fort Mercer on 20 November, Captain Isaiah Robinson of Andrew Doria gave orders the next day for the crews to burn their ships to prevent their capture. This was done shortly thereafter.
