= Dangé-Saint-Romain =

- Commune
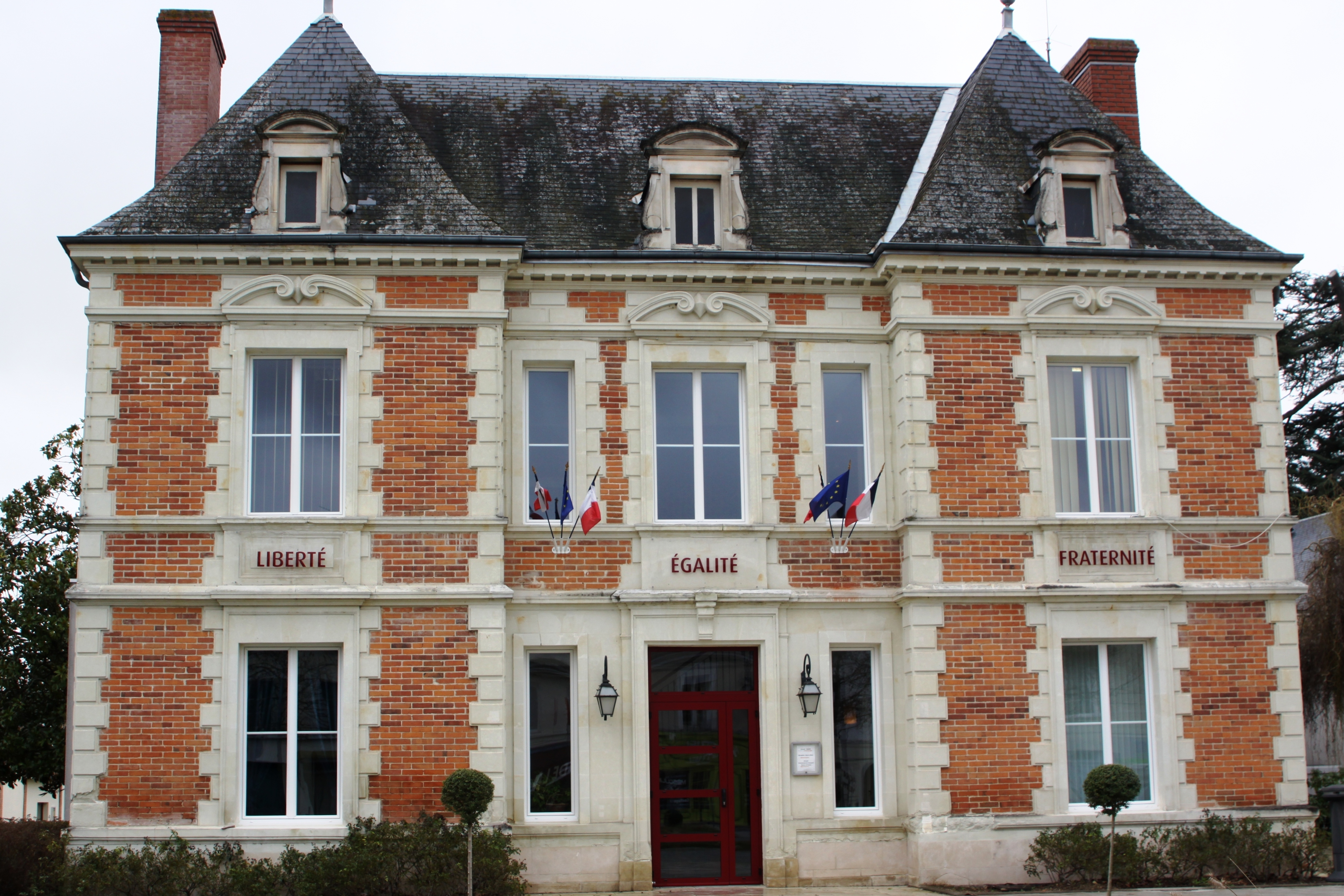
- The town hall in Dangé-Saint-Romain

- Coat of arms
- Location of Dangé-Saint-Romain
- Location within France Location within Nouvelle-Aquitaine
- Coordinates: 46°56′14″N 0°36′24″E
- Country: France
- Region: Nouvelle-Aquitaine
- Department: Vienne
- Arrondissement: Châtellerault
- Canton: Châtellerault-2
- Intercommunality: CA Grand Châtellerault

Government
  - Mayor (2020–2026): Nathalie Marquès-Nauleau
- Area^{1}: 34.99 km^{2} (13.51 sq mi)
- Elevation: 61 m (200 ft)
- Highest elevation: 127 m (417 ft)
- Lowest elevation: 37 m (121 ft)
- Population (2023): 2,959
  - Density: 84.57/km^{2} (219.0/sq mi)
- Time zone: UTC+01:00 (CET)
  - Summer (DST): UTC+02:00 (CEST)
- INSEE/Postal code: 86092 /86220
- ^{1} French Land Register data, which excludes lakes, ponds, glaciers > 1 km^{2} (0.386 sq mi or 247 acres) and river estuaries.

Dangé-Saint-Romain (French pronunciation: [dɑ̃ʒe sɛ̃ ʁɔmɛ̃]) is a commune in the Vienne department in the Nouvelle Aquitaine region formerly in the Nouvelle-Aquitaine region in western France. Its inhabitants are called Dangéens or Dangéennes in French.

== Demographics ==
Historical population
Year	Pop.	±% p.a.
1968	2,018	—
1975	2,530	+3.28%
1982	2,839	+1.66%
1990	3,150	+1.31%
1999	3,135	−0.05%
2007	3,143	+0.03%
2012	3,095	−0.31%
2017	2,981	−0.75%
2023	2,959	−0.12%
Source: INSEE

== See also ==
- Communes of the Vienne department
