= Sonneborn–Berger score =

Scoring system used to break ties in chess tournaments

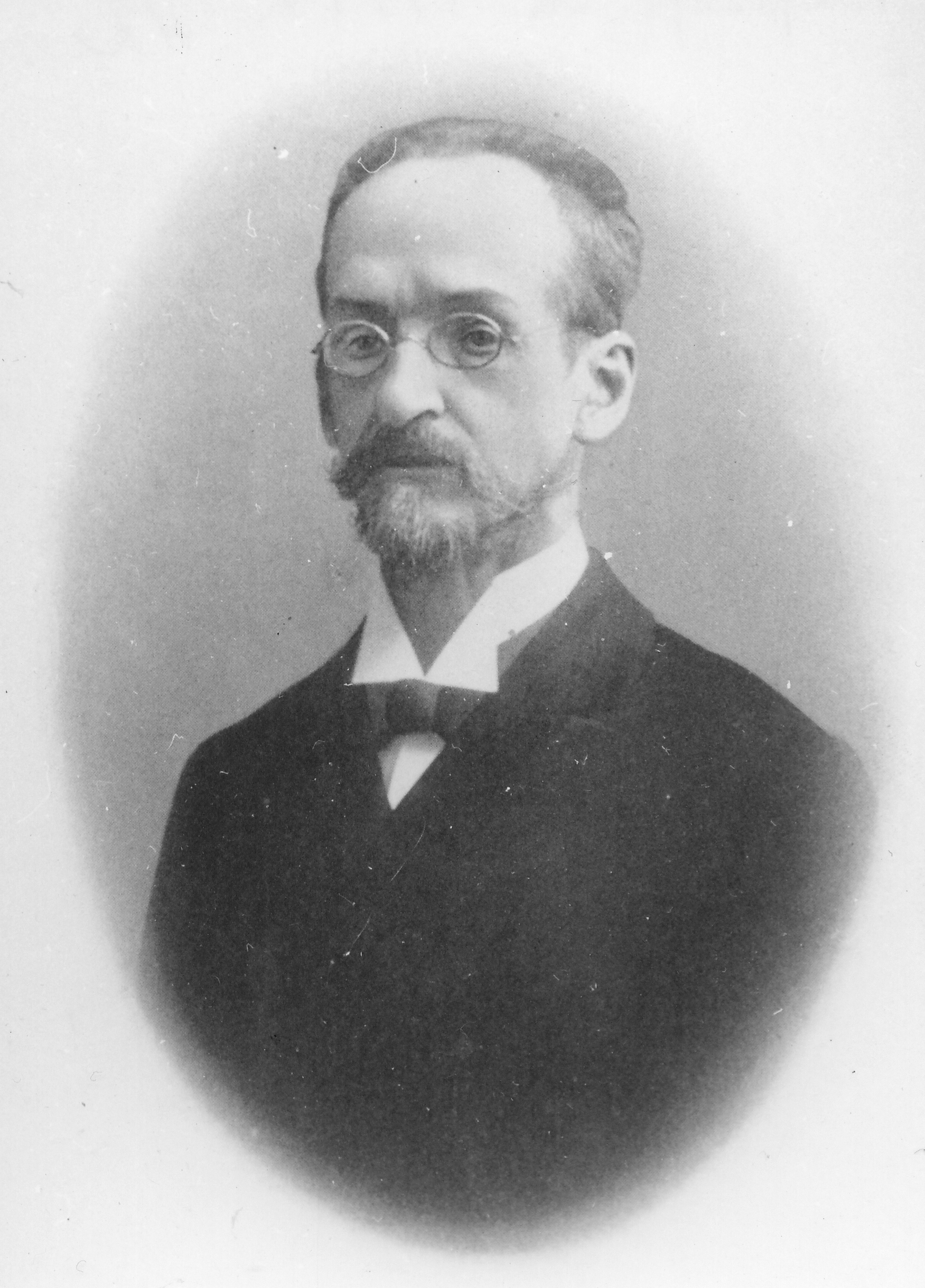
Johann Nepomuk Berger (1845-1933), one of the namesakes

The Sonneborn–Berger score (or the Neustadtl score or rarely Neustadtl Sonneborn–Berger score) is a scoring system often used to break ties in chess tournaments. It is computed by summing the full conventional score of each defeated opponent and half the conventional score of each drawn opponent.

Neustadtl score is named after Hermann Neustadtl, who proposed it in a letter published in Chess Monthly in 1882. A similar scoring system was first proposed by Oscar Gelbfuhs in 1873, to be used as a weighted score in place of the raw score; his system was also designed to work for tournaments where not everyone had played the same number of games. The scoring system is often called the Sonneborn–Berger score, though this is something of a misnomer, since William Sonneborn and Johann Berger were advocates of a variant now known as the non-Neustadtl Sonneborn–Berger score, which added in the square of the raw score of each player.

Both the Gelbfuhs and the non-Neustadtl Sonneborn–Berger score provide a full weighted score to replace the raw score, but this is not needed for breaking ties between players with conventional scoring. As a result, it is the Neustadtl Sonneborn–Berger score that is in common use for tiebreaks in modern chess.

== Use in Round Robin Tournaments ==
The Sonneborn–Berger score is the most popular tiebreaker method used in round-robin tournaments. However, in contrast to Swiss tournaments, where such tiebreaker scores indicate who had the stronger opponents according to final rankings, in round-robin tournaments, all players have the same opponents, so the logic is a lot less clear-cut.

The rationale of using the Sonneborn–Berger score in round-robin tournaments is that it is better to score well against higher-ranking players than against lower-ranking players. Therefore the top players of the tournament are more in a battle with each other than counting how much they defeat the lower-ranked players.

A counter-argument would be that the champion of a chess tournament such as the Candidates should not have trouble beating lower-ranking opponents in addition to scoring well against higher-ranking opponents, and therefore wins against lower and higher ranked opponents should be counted equally.

Other common tiebreaking methods in chess tournaments include the head-to-head score, the Koya score, or favoring the player with the most wins (or black games). In Swiss system events, comparison of the Buchholz scores and the sum of progressive scores are common.

== Neustadtl Sonneborn–Berger score ==
A player's Neustadtl Sonneborn–Berger score is calculated by adding the sum of the conventional scores of the players they have defeated to half the sum of the conventional scores of those they have drawn against. The main point is to give more value for a win/draw against a player performing well at the tournament, than for a win/draw against a player performing poorly.

Since players may share the same score, further means of breaking ties may be required; common methods include considering the score in games played between the tied players or favouring the player with the most wins. Some tournaments do not use Neustadtl to break ties at all (Linares, for example, gives preference to the player with the most wins), and others use no tie-breaking method at all, sharing the prize money on offer between players. In national championships or events which act as qualifying tournaments for others, there may be a blitz playoff between the tied players. Neustadtl remains the most common tie-breaking method in round-robin tournaments, though in Swiss system events, comparison of the Buchholz scores and the sum of progressive scores is more common.

=== Example ===
As an example of the system in action, here is the crosstable of the 1975–80 World Correspondence Chess Championship Final:

Position	Name	Results against each opponent															Points	Neustadtl score
Position	Name	1	2	3	4	5	6	7	8	9	10	11	12	13	14	15	Points	Neustadtl score
1	Sloth	-	½	½	1	½	½	1	1	½	1	½	1	1	1	1	11	69.5
2	Zagorovsky	½	-	0	½	1	½	1	1	1	½	1	1	1	1	1	11	66.75
3	Kosenkov	½	1	-	½	½	½	½	½	1	1	½	1	1	1	1	10½	67.5
4	Khasin	0	½	½	-	½	1	½	0	1	1	½	1	½	1	½	8½	54.75
5	Kletsel	½	0	½	½	-	½	½	½	½	0	1	1	½	1	1	8	47.75
6	De Carbonnel	½	½	½	0	½	-	½	½	0	1	½	½	0	1	1	7	45.25
7	Arnlind	0	0	½	½	½	½	-	½	1	0	½	½	1	1	½	7	42.5
8	Dunhaupt	0	0	½	1	½	½	½	-	0	½	1	0	1	½	1	7	41.5
9	Maedler	½	0	0	0	½	1	0	1	-	1	½	½	½	½	1	7	41.5
10	Estrin	0	½	0	0	1	0	1	½	0	-	1	1	1	0	1	7	40.5
11	Walther	½	0	½	½	0	½	½	0	½	0	-	0	1	½	1	5½	33.25
12	Boey	0	0	0	0	0	½	½	1	½	0	1	-	½	½	1	5½	28.5
13	Abramov	0	0	0	½	½	1	0	0	½	0	0	½	-	½	1	4½	24.75
14	Siklos	0	0	0	0	0	0	0	½	½	1	½	½	½	-	1	4½	22.75
15	Nun	0	0	0	½	0	0	½	0	0	0	0	0	0	0	-	1	7.75

Both Jørn Sloth and Vladimir Zagorovsky finished with 11 points from 14 games, but Sloth won the tournament because his Neustadtl score of 69.5 was higher than Zagorovsky's 66.75. Kosenkov had a higher Neustadl score (67.5) than Zagorovsky, but finished third due to his lower points total of 10 1/2. Sloth's Neustadtl score can be calculated by multiplying his results by the points total of each opponent, then summing them together:

$(0.5\times11) + (0.5\times10.5) + (1\times8.5) + (0.5\times8) + (0.5\times7) + (1\times7) + (1\times7) +$$(0.5\times7) + (1\times7) + (0.5\times5.5) + (1\times5.5) + (1\times4.5) + (1\times4.5) + (1\times1) = 69.5$

In general, if $x_{ij}$ denotes player $i$'s score against player $j$, then $i$'s point total is $s_i=\sum_{j\neq i} x_{ij}$, and $i$'s Neustadtl score is $N_i=\sum_{j \neq i} x_{ij} s_{j}$.

== Similar scoring systems ==
=== Gelbfuhs score ===
In 1873, at the Vienna International tournament, not all competitors had played the same number of games and there were disagreements about the final standings. Austrian lawyer and contestant Oscar Gelbfuhs proposed a weighted scoring method that both avoided most ties and provided a full ranking of players even when not all have played the same number of games.

For a player $i$ who has played $n$ games and scored $x_{ij}$ against player $j$, his Gelbfuhs score $G_i$ is defined as follows:

$s_i = \sum_{j\neq i} x_{ij}$, player $i$'s raw point total;
$G_i = \sum_{j \neq i}x_{ij}\left(1 + \frac{s_j}{n}\right)$, player $i$'s Gelbfuhs score.

Note that $s_j$ is between $0$ and $n$ (equal to $n$ if $j$ won every game and $0$ if he lost), so that $s_j/n$ is between $0$ and $1$. The Gelbfuhs score therefore first weights each result $x_{ij}$ by a factor $1 + s_j/n$, between $1$ and $2$, and then sums the individual weighted scores. In the Gelbfuhs score calculation, a loss is worth $0$, a draw is worth between $0.5$ and $1$, and a win is worth between $1$ and $2$.

At the end of an $n$-round tournament, a player's Gelbfuhs score is the sum of his raw score $s_i$ and his scaled Neustadtl score: $G_i = s_i + \frac{1}{n}N_i$.

=== Non-Neustadtl Sonneborn–Berger score ===
The non-Neustadtl Sonneborn–Berger score is the original scoring system proposed by William Sonneborn and Johann Berger as an improvement to the Neustadtl score, to be used as a weighted score in round-robin tournaments instead of the raw score for final places, similar to the Gelbfuhs score.

In 1886, Sonneborn criticized the Neustadtl score and suggested adding the square of the player's points to the weighted score. In 1887 and 1888, Berger studied Gelbfuhs' system and Sonneborn's suggestion, and adopted Sonneborn's approach for tournaments. This was known as the Sonneborn–Berger system. In modern chess, these scores are used only to break ties between equally scoring players, where adding the square of the player's raw score has no impact on the tie-break, so the improvement of Sonneborn and Berger is omitted in modern usage. However the system kept the Sonneborn–Berger name and the result is widely called the Sonneborn–Berger score.

As a result, when talking about their original scoring system, it is called the non-Neustadtl Sonneborn–Berger score. For comparison, in a tournament where everyone has played N games, the Sonneborn–Berger score (SB), non-Neustadtl Sonneborn–Berger score (NNSB), and Gelbfuhs score (GF) would be:

$SB(p) = S_w + \frac{1}{2}S_d$
$NNSB(p) = R_p \times R_p + S_w + \frac{1}{2}S_d$
$N \times GF(p) = N \times R_p + S_w + \frac{1}{2}S_d$

== See also ==
- Tie-breaking in Swiss-system tournaments
- Strength of Victory
