= Strength of schedule =

Sports scheduling metric

In sports, strength of schedule (SOS) refers to the difficulty or ease of a team's/person's opponent as compared to other teams/persons. This is especially important if teams in a league do not play each other the same number of times.

== Computation ==
The strength of schedule can be calculated in many ways. Such calculations are the basis of many of the various tie-breaking systems used in Swiss-system tournaments in chess and other tabletop games.

In the National Football League (NFL), the strength of schedule (SOS) is the combined record of all teams in a schedule, and the strength of victory (SOV) is the combined record of all teams that were beaten in that schedule. For example, opponents of the 2016 New England Patriots had a combined record of 111–142–3 (a win percentage of 0.439, the SOS), and Patriots' wins came against teams with a combined record of 93–129–2 (a win percentage of 0.424, the SOV).

Before the 2004 season, in the American college football Bowl Championship Series (BCS) the SOS was calculated as shown at right, where OR is the opponents' record, while OOR is the opponents' opponents record.

Other calculations include adding the opponent's power ratings and multiplying them by the number of games, or a modification by assigning weights (higher weights for "stronger" teams).

Furthermore, several more factors may be added, such as the position of the team in the league, the strength of the team's division or conference, which games count in the formula and which do not (vital in the Bowl Championship Series), the locations of the games (see home team and home advantage) and others.

== Use ==
The now defunct BCS previously used the SOS in its formula to determine which teams will play in BCS Bowls, and more importantly, to the BCS National Championship Game. On the contrary, several leagues do not incorporate SOS directly into team standings. For most leagues, however, the team standings are typically affected by the overall strength of the conference the team plays in. The strength of the conference largely depends on the number of NFL players the conference produces. For instance, from 1992 to 2011, of 1,874 college athletes who entered the NFL, roughly 31% came from the SEC compared to only 0.64% from the MAC-EAST conference. Therefore, playing a team in the SEC would likely increase a team's SOS as compared to playing a team in the MAC-EAST.

The NFL uses strength of schedule as a secondary tie-breaker for divisional rankings and playoff qualification, and as a primary tie-breaker for the NFL draft. While the NFL has 32 teams, each team plays only 17 games against 14 other teams. This limited scheduling makes strength of schedule a relevant metric for breaking ties, if primary tiebreakers such as head-to-head records do not break a tie.

Major League Baseball (MLB) has a more extreme way of scheduling since interleague games are done rarely, and were only introduced in 1997, plus the fact that interleague games do not exactly have concrete rules, save for the number of rest days and doubleheaders.

In the National Basketball Association (NBA), the 30 teams are all guaranteed to face each other at least twice in an 82-game regular season, although intra-division games are more frequent (as much as four times) than inter-conference games (twice). In the National Hockey League, prior to 2008, some teams did not meet each other in a given year, and intra-division games are more frequent (six times) when compared to the NBA. A strong team in a weak division or conference is capable of bloating their record in order to have a better seeding in the playoffs.

In order to resolve differing strengths of schedule among teams, the playoffs are held after the season to determine which team will win the championship. The best teams from each conference qualify and are done at a variety of formats. The playoffs conclude with a championship game or series with the two teams representing their own conferences. The playoffs may also award a home advantage to a team with a superior record, regardless of their SOS, although the NFL holds its championship game at a predetermined site, while MLB awarded home-field advantage in the World Series to the team representing the league that won the All-Star Game from 2003 to 2016.

The concept of "strength of schedule" is alien to European domestic leagues since each league is not divided into divisions or conferences (the meaning of "conference" is different here, since even though several leagues may be in one conference, teams from the same conference do not play teams from other leagues of the same conference. See Football Conference for an example.), and every team plays every opponent twice (home and away) and as such, no playoffs are usually done to determine the winner; the team with the best record wins the championship outright, with several tiebreaking criteria to determine a team's overall standing.

In inter-European competition, no permanent divisions or groups are instituted although qualifying teams are drawn into different groups, where the top teams per group advance into the "knockout stage" which is almost similar to the concept of "playoffs" in North American sports. In association football, UEFA coefficients are used to determine seedings in tournaments organized by UEFA. Countries that had teams progress deeper into UEFA competitions have a higher coefficient. A higher coefficient means that teams do not have to meet teams that are as strong as them early in the tournament, while weaker teams have to face stronger teams in the early stages.
