= Mikhail Umansky =

Russian grandmaster of correspondence chess (born 1952)

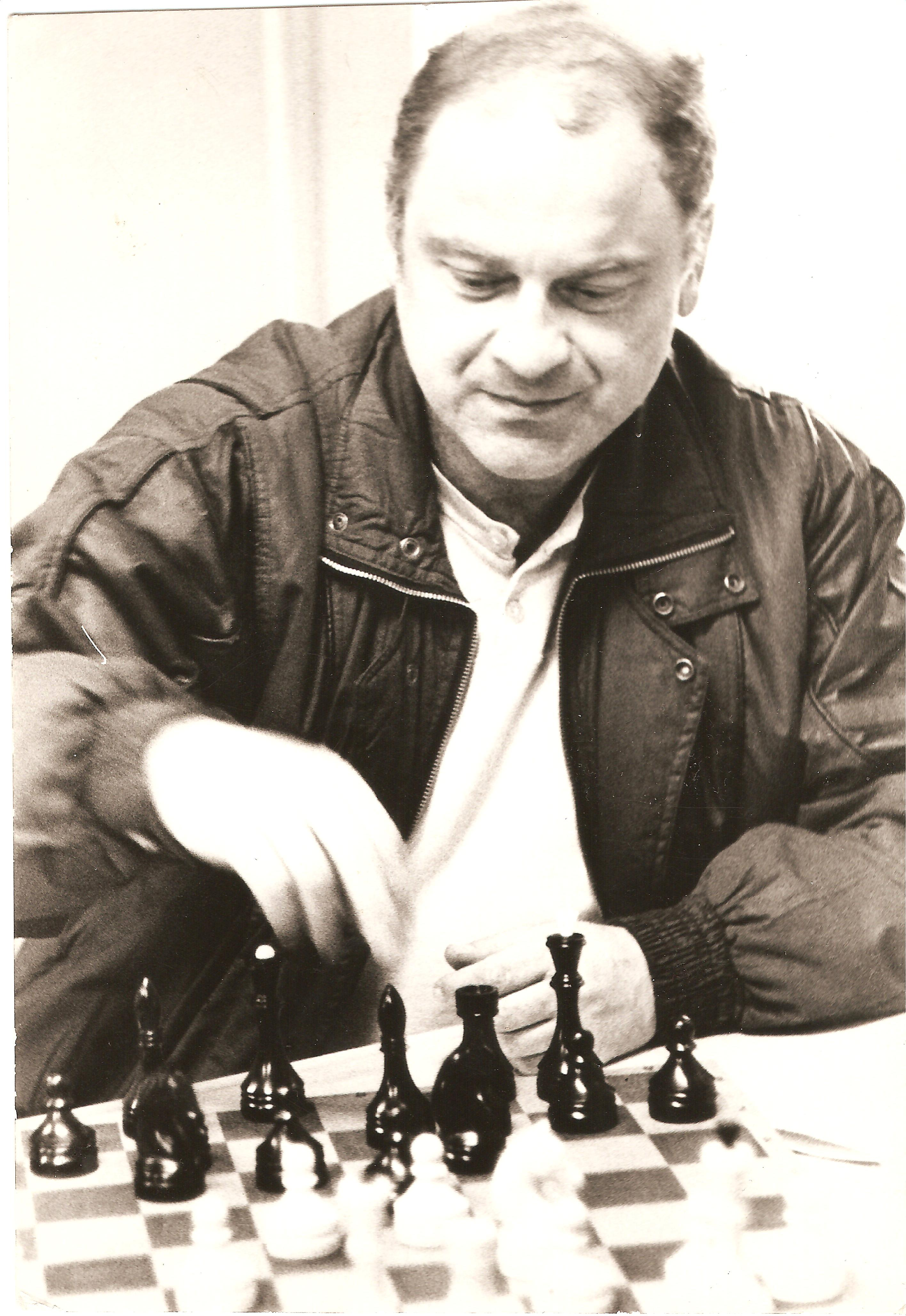

Personal information
- Full name: Mikhail Markovich Umansky
- Born: January 21, 1952 Stavropol, USSR
- Died: December 17, 2010 (aged 58) Augsburg, Germany

Chess career
- Country: Soviet Union; Russia
- Title: ICCF Grandmaster (1994)
- ICCF World Champion: 1989–98
- ICCF rating: 2651 (October 2010)
- ICCF peak rating: 2701 (July 1996)

Mikhail Markovich Umansky (Russian: Михаил Маркович Уманский; January 21, 1952 – December 17, 2010) was a Russian chess grandmaster of correspondence chess, who was the 13th ICCF World Champion in correspondence chess between 1989 and 1998. He was also USSR Correspondence Champion in 1978.

== Chess biography ==
Umansky was born in Stavropol, then USSR and at the age of 16, he tied for first in the USSR junior chess championship. He is considered by some to be the greatest correspondence chess player of all time, since he convincingly won a "champion of champions" tournament, the ICCF 50 Years World Champion Jubilee, a special invitational correspondence tournament involving all living former ICCF World Champions. He scored 7/8 (+6 −0 =2), two points ahead of Gert Jan Timmerman, Fritz Baumbach and Victor Palciauskas. One of his victims was Hans Berliner, who said after his defeat: "It is amazing that Umansky took only 55 days to play this wonderful game. I still do not know when I went wrong."

Umansky died on December 17, 2010, in Augsburg, Germany.

In 2011, the Russian Correspondence Chess Association organized in his honor the chess tournament Umansky Memorial, won by the Italian CCGM Eros Riccio.

Preceded by Grigory Sanakoev	World Correspondence Chess Champion; 1989–1998	Succeeded by Tõnu Õim
