= Fathullah Kushbegi Madrasah =

Madrasa in Bukhara, Uzbekistan

- Fathullah Kushbegi Madrasasi

General information
- Type: Madrasah
- Architectural style: Central Asian architecture
- Location: Bukhara Khanate, Uzbekistan
- Opened: XVI century
- Owner: Fathullah Kushbegi

Technical details
- Material: brick, wood, stone and ganch
- Size: 65 rooms
- Floor count: 2 floors

Fathullah Kushbegi Madrasah is located in Bukhara, Uzbekistan. The madrasah has not been preserved today. Fathullah Kushbegi madrasah was built by Fathullah Kushbegi in 1585 in Haji Hasan Guzar, during the reign of Abdullah Khan II, who ruled the Bukhara Khanate. Haji Hasan Guzari is also called Fathullah Kushbegi Guzari. The madrasah is two-storeyed and made of baked bricks. The cells were in two rows, one side facing the courtyard and the other facing the street. For this reason, the locals called this madrasah the two-faced madrasah.

According to Olga Sukhareva, the madrasah consisted of 100 rooms. Madrasah belongs to the second category in Bukhara. According to Fitrat, the annual endowment of the madrasah is 80,000 tenge. Research scientist Abdusattor Jumanazarov studied a number of foundation documents related to this madrasah and provided information related to the madrasah. According to the Waqf document, the emir of this madrasah, Fathullah Koshbegi ibn Amir Asadullah, built a madrasah in Masudbek Guzar for the people of knowledge. Madrasah had upper and lower rooms, inner and outer courtyard, mosque, ablution room and domes. To the west of the Fathullah Koshbegi madrasah, there were waqf shops, to the north-east there were properties, and to the south there was a street.

For the madrasah, the waqf endowed 1500 tanabs of land in Komi Abu Muslim, 218 tanabs in Poyrud, 1000 tanabs in Qasri Safed and Raboti Kalmak regions, and 157.5 tanabs in Rabotak region of Poyrud. The madrasah was a mutawwali himself. In the madrasah, the teachers taught for 4 days and 2 students lived in each room. Seven mudarris taught in this madrasah. More than 15 documents related to the activities of the madrasah have been identified. The salary of mudarris was 30-50 gold. The madrasah was destroyed in 1935 during the Soviet period. Sadri Zia wrote that there were 65 rooms in this madrasah. The madrasah of Fathullah Koshbegi consisted of 65 rooms. This madrasah was built in the style of Central Asian architecture. The madrasah is built of brick, wood, stone and ganch.
