= Léotard =

Léotard is a French surname. Notable people with the surname include:

- Christophe Léotard (born 1966), French chess player
- François Léotard (1942-2023), French politician
- Jules Léotard (1838–1870), French acrobat
- Philippe Léotard (1940–2001), French actor

== See also ==
- Leotard
