= Robert Hartoch =

Dutch chess player (1947–2009)

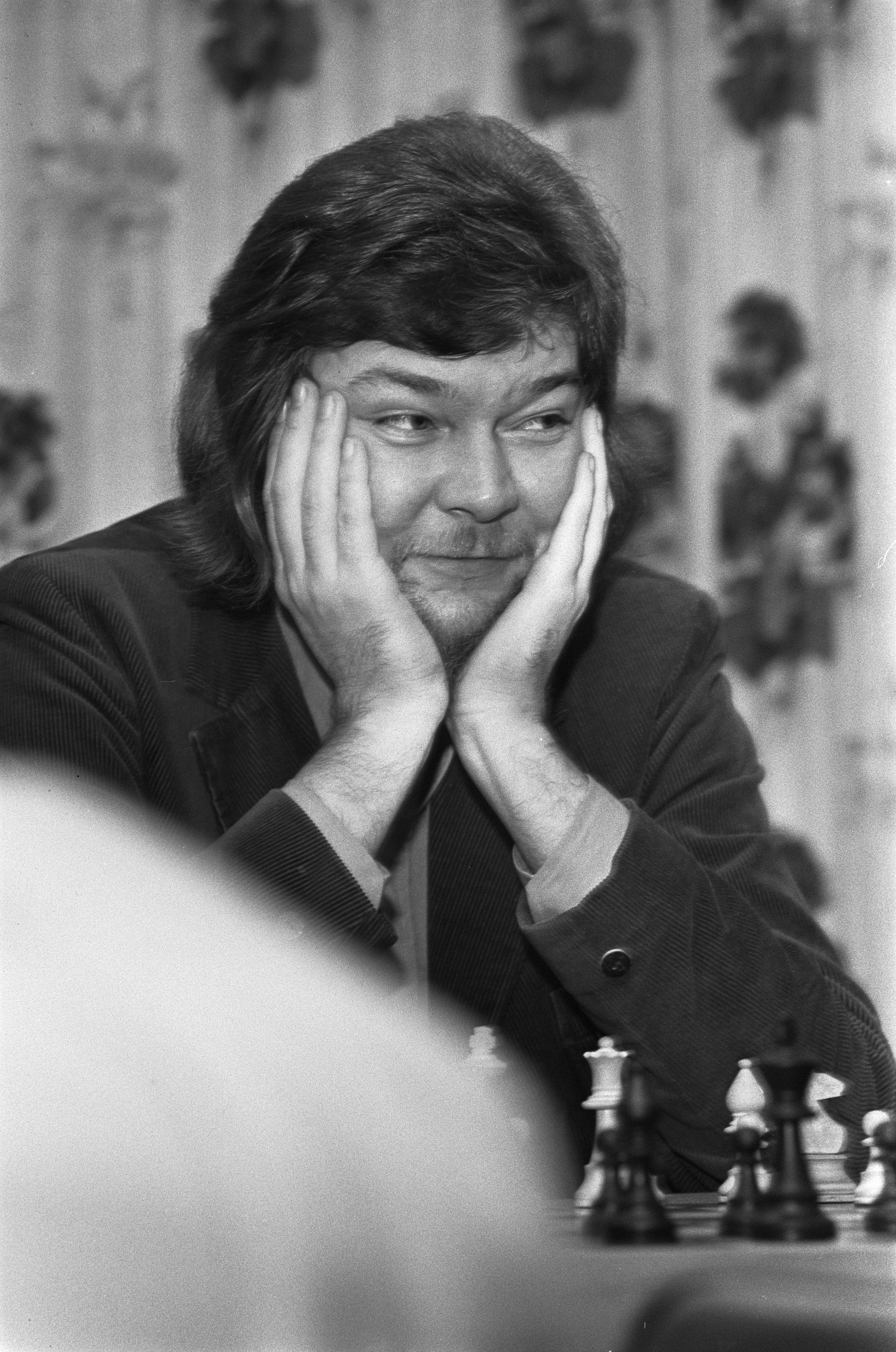
- Robert Hartoch in 1973

Personal information
- Born: 24 March 1947 Amsterdam, Netherlands
- Died: 28 May 2009 (aged 62) Amsterdam, Netherlands

Chess career
- Country: Netherlands
- Title: International Master (1971)
- Peak rating: 2430 (July 1972)

Robert Gijsbertus Hartoch (24 March 1947 — 28 May 2009) was a Dutch chess International Master (1971).

== Biography ==
Most of Robert Hartoch's successes were in junior events. In 1964, in Groningen he and Jørn Sloth were co-winners of the European Junior Chess Championship. In 1965, in Barcelona, he finished second to Bojan Kurajica in the World Junior Chess Championship, ahead of Robert Hübner and Vladimir Tukmakov.

Hartoch had only middling success in chess tournaments as an adult. He played in the Dutch Chess Championship multiple times, but never finished higher than 4th place (in 1972 and 1975). In 1968, he shared 2nd-3rd place with Anatoly Lutikov in the IBM international chess tournament. In 1971, he shared 2nd-3rd place with András Adorján in the B tournament of the Hoogovens Wijk aan Zee Chess Festival. In 1991, in Dieren he finished 3rd in the Open Chess tournament.

Robert Hartoch played for Netherlands in the Chess Olympiads:

- In 1970, at second reserve board in the 19th Chess Olympiad in Siegen (+3, =5, -1),
- In 1972, at first reserve board in the 20th Chess Olympiad in Skopje (+5, =7, -2).

Hartoch played for Netherlands in the European Team Chess Championship:

- In 1965, at second reserve board in the 3rd European Team Chess Championship in Hamburg (+0, =3, -3).

Hartoch played for the Netherlands in the Clare Benedict Chess Cups:

- In 1970, at first reserve board in the 17th Clare Benedict Chess Cup in Paignton (+0, =3, -0),
- In 1972, at third board in the 19th Clare Benedict Chess Cup in Vienna (+2, =3, -0) and won team silver and individual gold medals,
- In 1973, at fourth board in the 20th Clare Benedict Chess Cup in Gstaad (+1, =4, -1),
- In 1974, at first reserve board in the 21st Clare Benedict Chess Cup in Cala Galdana (+0, =4, -0).

In 1971, he was awarded the FIDE International Master (IM) title.
