= Ulrich Stephan =

German ICCF Grandmaster (born 1970)

Personal information
- Born: May 7, 1970 (age 56)

Chess career
- Country: Germany
- Title: ICCF Grandmaster (2010)
- ICCF World Champion: 2007–10

Ulrich Stephan (born May 7, 1970) is a German ICCF Grandmaster.

== Biography ==
From 1987 to 2005 he participated in various tournaments in Germany, including the chess Bundesliga. Later his main focus switched to correspondence chess. In 2010 he won the 23rd World Correspondence Chess Championship (2007–2010).

| Preceded by (Russia) Aleksandr Surenovich Dronov | World Correspondence Chess Champion; 2007–2010 | Succeeded by (Slovenia) Marjan Šemrl |
