= Sjørring railway station =

Railway station in Thisted Municipality, Denmark

Sjørring
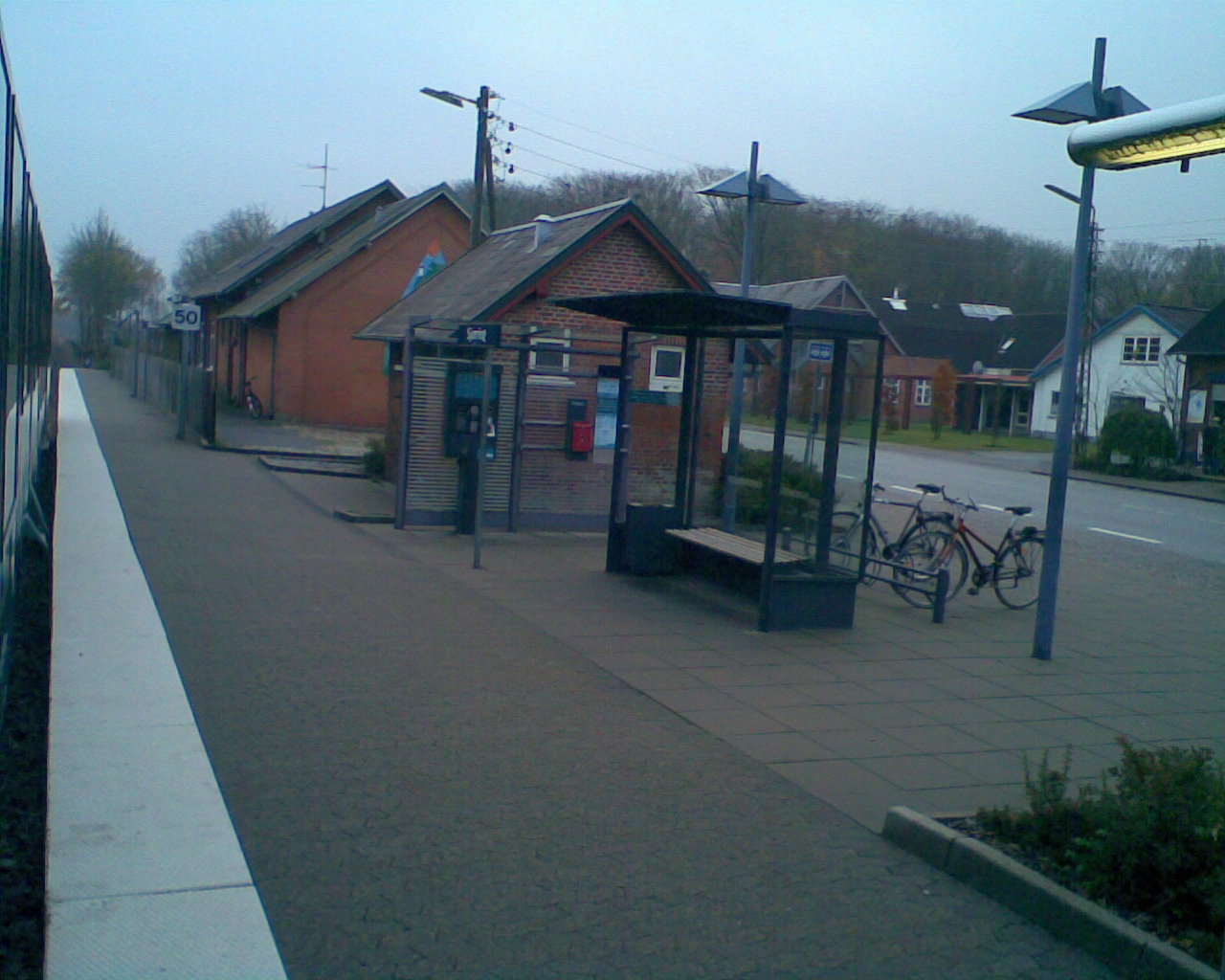
- Sjørring station in 2008

General information
- Location: Vorupørvej 23A; Sjørring, 7700 Thisted; Thisted Municipality; Denmark
- Coordinates: 56°57′7″N 8°35′17″E
- Elevation: 19.3 metres (63 ft)
- Owner: Banedanmark
- Line: Thy Line
- Platforms: 1
- Tracks: 1
- Train operators: DSB

History
- Opened: 1882

Services
Preceding station	DSB Vores Tog	Following station
Snedsted towards Struer	Struer–Thisted Regional train	Thisted Terminus
Location
- Location within Denmark Location within North Jutland Region

Sjørring station is a railway station serving the small railway town of Sjørring in Thy, Denmark.

Sjørring station is located on the Thy Line between Struer and Thisted. The station was opened in 1882 with the opening of the Thy Line. It offers direct regional train services to Struer and Thisted. The train services are operated by the national railway company DSB.

== See also ==
- List of railway stations in Denmark
