= Fabian Stanach =

Polish chess player

Fabian Stanach is a Polish chess player. He won the 31st World Correspondence Chess Championship in 2022.
