= Pertti Lehikoinen =

Finnish chess player

Personal information
- Full name: Pertti Ilari Lehikoinen
- Born: March 19, 1952 (age 74) Helsinki, Finland

Chess career
- Country: Finland
- Title: ICCF Grandmaster (1985)
- FIDE rating: 2217 (July 2004)
- Peak rating: 2262 (July 2002)
- ICCF rating: 2607 (January 2016)
- ICCF peak rating: 2607 (January 2016)

Pertti Ilari Lehikoinen (born 19 March 1952 in Helsinki) is a Finnish chess player who holds the ICCF title of correspondence chess grandmaster. He won the 20th World Correspondence Chess Championship (started 25 October 2004, finished 20 February 2011).

Preceded by Christophe Léotard	World Correspondence Chess Champion; 2004-2011	Succeeded by Joop van Oosterom
