= Sjørring =

- Town
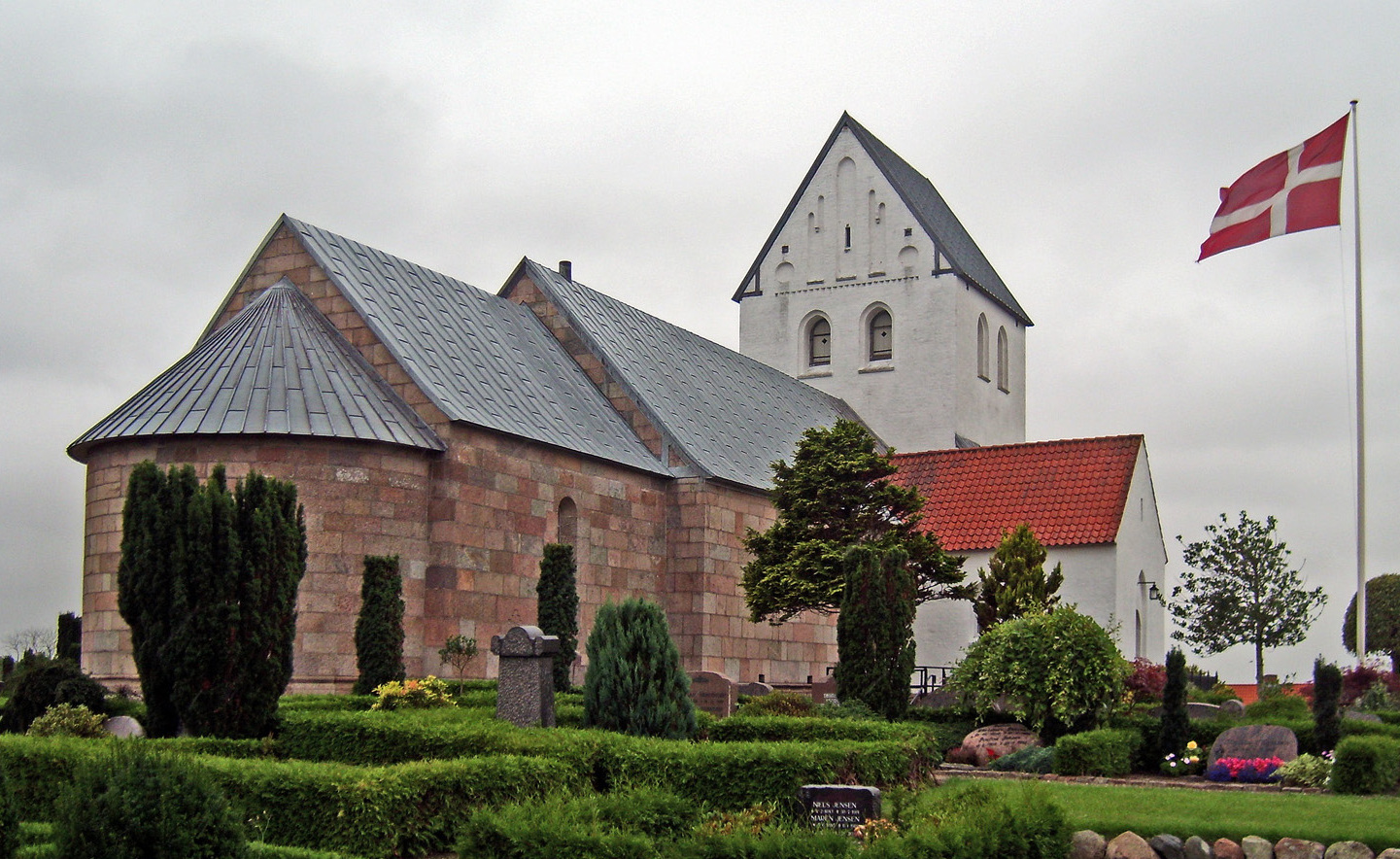
- Sjørring Church

- Location in North Jutland Region Sjørring (Denmark)
- Coordinates: 56°57′9″N 8°35′18″E
- Country: Denmark
- Region: North Jutland Region
- Municipality: Thisted Municipality

Population (2026)
  - Urban: 715
- Time zone: UTC+1 (CET)
  - Summer (DST): UTC+2 (CEST)
- Postal code: DK-7700 Thisted

Sjørring is a small railway town in Thisted Municipality in North Jutland Region, Denmark. As of 1 January 2026 it has a population of 715. It is located in the central part of the Thy district 7 km west of Thisted.

Sjørring is served by Sjørring railway station located on the Thy Line between Thisted and Struer.

The medieval hillfort Sjørring Vold, locally often called Sjørring Volde, is located in Sjørring.

== Notable people ==
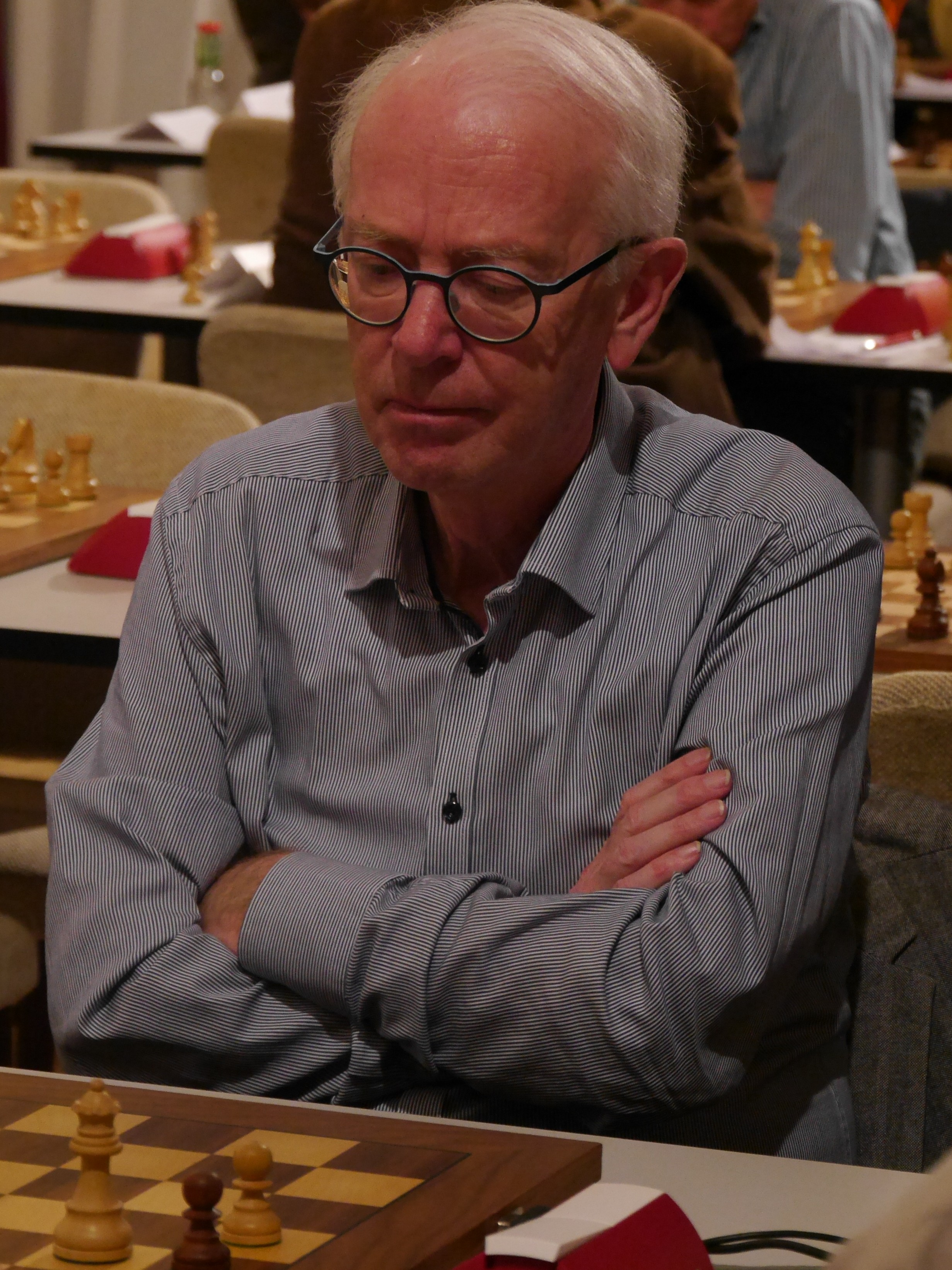
Jørn Sloth, 2016

- Jørn Sloth (born 1944 in Sjørring), a Danish chess player
