= Andrey Kochemasov =

Russian chess player (born 1950)

Personal information
- Born: Andrey Leonidovich Kochemasov; 3 October 1950 (age 76) Gagino, Nizhny Novgorod Oblast, Russia

Chess career
- Country: Russia
- Title: ICCF Grandmaster (2019)
- ICCF World Champion: 2017–2019
- ICCF rating: 2555 (October 2021)

Andrey Leonidovich Kochemasov (Russian: Андрей Леонидович Кочемасов; born 3 October 1950) is a Russian chess player who received the title of ICCF title of Correspondence Chess Grandmaster in 2019. He is a World Correspondence Chess Championship winner (2017–2019).

== Biography ==
Andrey Kochemasov graduated to Nizhny Novgorod Medical Institute at the medical faculty. He worked as a surgeon and therapist. Andrey Kochemasov spent twenty years in Eastern Siberia, combining medical activities with commercial hunting.

From 1974 to following years, he participated in correspondence chess tournaments. In 1998, Andrey Kochemasov returned to his native village, Gagino, and devotes all his free time to correspondence chess tournaments. In 2009, he was awarded the ICCF International Correspondence Chess Master (IM) and International Correspondence Chess Master (SIM) titles. In 2019, Andrey Kochemasov won the 28th World Correspondence Chess Championship (2017–2019). In 2019, he was awarded the ICCF International Correspondence Chess Grandmaster (GM) title.

Preceded by Aleksandr Dronov	World Correspondence Chess Champion; 2017–2019	Succeeded by -
