= Lee E. McMahon =

American computer scientist (1931–1989)

Lee Edward McMahon
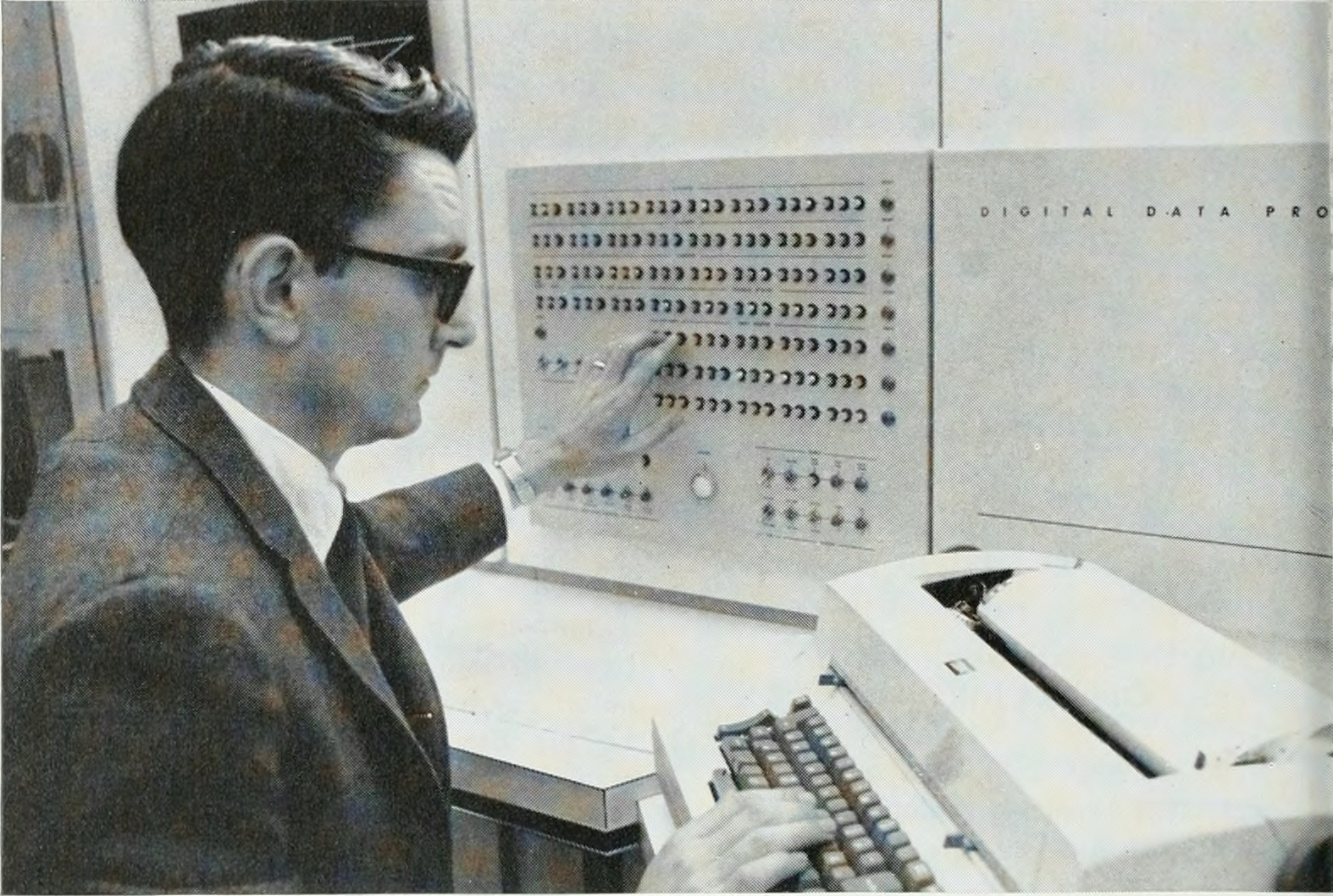
- McMahon at Bell Labs in 1966
- Born: October 24, 1931; St. Louis, Missouri
- Died: February 15, 1989 (aged 57); New York City, New York
- Education: Harvard University
- Known for: sed, McMahon system tournament
- Spouse: Helen G McMahon
- Scientific career
- Fields: Computer science
- Workplaces: Bell Labs
- Thesis: Grammatical analysis as a part of understanding a sentence (1963)

Lee Edward McMahon (October 24, 1931 – February 15, 1989) was an American computer scientist.

== Family and education ==
McMahon was born in St. Louis, Missouri, to father Leo E. McMahon and mother Catherine McCarthy. He grew up in St. Louis and attended St. Louis University High School. In 1955, he received his bachelor's degree summa cum laude from St. Louis University. McMahon was awarded a regular graduate fellowship from the St. Louis University for study in psychology at Harvard University, where he then obtained a Ph.D. in psychology. His Ph.D. thesis at Harvard University was published in 1963 with the title "Grammatical analysis as a part of understanding a sentence".

He was married to Helen G McMahon, and they had two children, Michael and Catherine.

== Bell Labs ==
McMahon worked for Bell Labs from 1963 up until his death in 1989. He worked initially as a Linguistics Researcher and focussed around a language called FASE (Fundamentally Analyzable Simplified English) with the goal of improving communication between humans and computers.

McMahon officially joined the Bell Labs Computing Research Center in 1975.

A project which attempted to clarify the authorship of The Federalist Papers connected him to Robert Morris and began his involvement with early Unix development.

McMahon is best known for his contributions to early versions of the Unix operating system, in particular the sed stream editor. McMahon contributed to the development of comm, qsort, grep, index, cref, cu, and Datakit.

== McMahon's system tournament ==
McMahon worked on the creation of a pairing system for go together with Bob Ryder of Bell Labs in the early 1960s. The system, which is considered a variant of the Swiss system, was introduced into the U.S. Championship go tournaments in the 1970s. It remains the default system for most British go tournaments.
