= Horst Rittner =

German chess grandmaster (1930–2021)

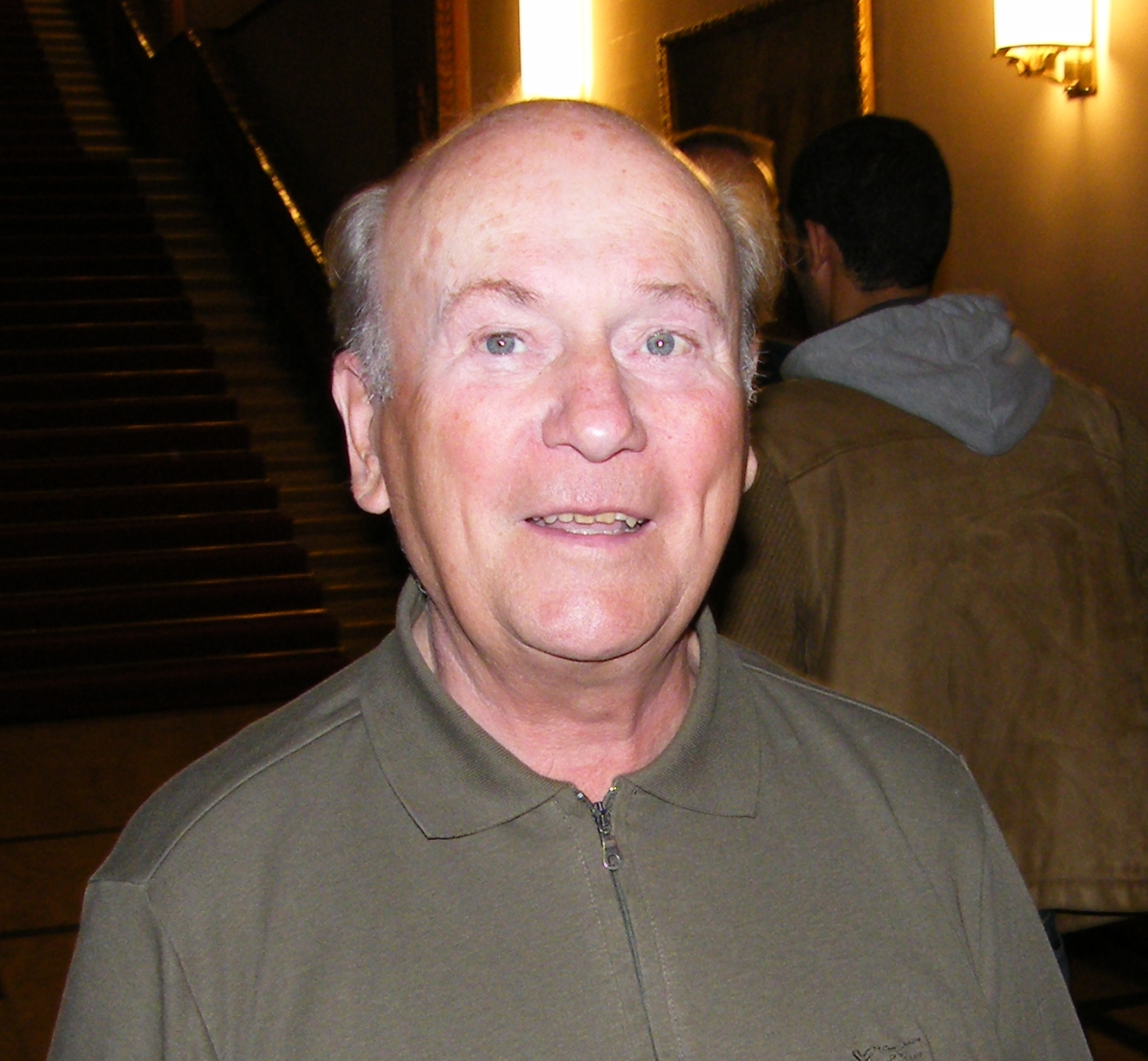
- Rittner in 2008

Personal information
- Full name: Horst Robert Rittner
- Born: 16 July 1930 Breslau, Germany (today Wrocław, Poland)
- Died: 14 June 2021 (aged 90)

Chess career
- Country: Germany
- Title: ICCF Grandmaster (1961)
- ICCF World Champion: 1968–1971

Horst Robert Rittner (16 July 1930 – 14 June 2021) was a German correspondence chess Grandmaster. He was born in Breslau, Weimar Germany, and was the sixth ICCF World Champion, between 1968 and 1971. He also edited the German magazine Schach.

Preceded by (United States) Hans Berliner	World Correspondence Chess Champion; 1968–1971	Succeeded by (Soviet Union) Yakov Estrin
