= Irina Perevertkina =

Russian chess player (born 1967)

Personal information
- Born: Irina Vladimirovna Perevertkina; 27 October 1967 (age 58) Moscow, Russia

Chess career
- Country: Soviet Union; Russia
- Title: ICCF International Master (2014); ICCF Lady Grandmaster (1998)
- ICCF World Champion: 2011–2014 (women); 2014–2017 (women); 2017–2020 (women)
- ICCF rating: 2468 (October 2021)
- ICCF peak rating: 2528 (July 1992)

Irina Vladimirovna Perevertkina (Russian: Ирина Владимировна Переверткина; born 27 October 1967) is a Russian Women ICCF Grandmaster.

== Biography ==
In 1985 Perevertkina graduated from Moscow Secondary School Nr. 905. In 1991 she graduated from Bauman Moscow State Technical University Faculty of Engineering Technology. In 2010 Perevertkina defended the master's degree in Russian State University of Physical Education, Sport, Youth and Tourism. Married, mother of two children. Since 1985 she working as a chess coach and head of department of sports school "Orienta" in Moscow. During many years she is the Moscow Chess Federation's Children's and Youth Committee Chairperson.

She started played to correspondence chess at the age of 6, but two years later participated in her first international tournament. In 2014 Perevertkina won the 9th Ladies World Correspondence Chess Championship (2011–2014), in 2017 she won the 10th Ladies World Correspondence Chess Championship (2014–2017) and in 2020 she won the 11th Ladies World Correspondence Chess Championship (2017–2020).

Preceded by Olga Sukhareva	Ladies World Correspondence Chess Champion; 2011–2014	Succeeded by Irina Perevertkina
Preceded by Irina Perevertkina	Ladies World Correspondence Chess Champion; 2014–2017	Succeeded by Irina Perevertkina
Preceded by Irina Perevertkina	Ladies World Correspondence Chess Champion; 2017–2020	Succeeded by incumbent
