= Tie-breaking in Swiss-system tournaments =

Determining winner in chess tournaments

Swiss-system tournaments, a type of group tournament common in chess and other board games, and in card games such as bridge, use various criteria to break ties between players who have the same total number of points after the last round. This is needed when prizes are indivisible, such as titles, trophies, or qualification for another tournament. Otherwise players often share the tied spots, with cash prizes being divided equally among the tied players.

Some tiebreakers used in other group tournaments are also used in Swiss-system tournaments, while others exploit the particular features of the Swiss system. If the players are still tied after one tie-break system is used, another system is used, and so on, until the tie is broken. Most of the methods are numerical methods based on the games that have already been played or other objective factors, while some methods require additional games to be played. In chess, where results are simply win/loss or draw, strength of schedule is the idea behind the methods based on the games already played: that the player that played the harder competition to achieve the same number of points should be ranked higher. In other games, results may supply more data used for breaking ties.

== Median / Buchholz / Solkoff ==
The Median system is also known as the Harkness System, after its inventor Kenneth Harkness, or the Median-Buchholz System.

For each player, this system sums the number of points earned by the player's opponents, excluding the highest and lowest. If there are nine or more rounds, the top two and bottom two scores are discarded. Unplayed games by the opponents count ½ point. Unplayed games by the player count zero points.

=== Modified Median ===
The Modified Median system is similar to the Median system, except:

- Players with exactly 50% score are handled as in the regular Median system;
- Players with more than 50% score have only their lowest-scoring opponent's score discarded;
- Players with less than 50% score have only their highest-scoring opponent's score discarded.
- Players who scored the same number of points on tie-breaks, then the winner is the one who won in a personal game.

=== Solkoff ===
This system is the same as the Median system, except that no scores are discarded. Ephraim Solkoff did not invent this system. He introduced it to the United States in 1950, but it was used in England prior to that.

== Cumulative ==
To calculate this, sum the running score for each round. For example, if a player has (in order) a win, loss, win, draw, and a loss; his round-by-round score will be 1, 1, 2, 2½, 2½. The sum of these numbers is 9. Additionally, one point is subtracted from the sum for each unplayed win, and ½ point is subtracted for each unplayed draw. In the previous example, if the fourth-round draw was instead a ½ point bye, then ½ point would be subtracted and the final sum would be 8½.

This system places more weight on games won in the early rounds and the least weight on games won in the final rounds. The rationale for this system is that a player who scored well early in the tournament has most likely faced tougher opponents in later rounds and should therefore be favored over a player who scored poorly in the start before subsequently scoring points against weaker opponents.

A practical benefit of the cumulative system is that it is simple to track with pen and paper when running a large tournament. Of course in the age of computers and smart phones, instead of accumulating points scored against weak players, we could just calculate who had the toughest schedule as with the Solkoff and median systems. An alternative explanation for the popularity of the cumulative system is that it is easier for coaches, players and the audience to follow the potential scores and prizes, as the point totals don't vary and only need to be added to from round to round.

=== Cumulative opponent's score ===
This sums the cumulative scores of the player's opponents.

== Result between tied players ==
If all the tied players have met each other, the sum of points from these encounters is used. The player with the highest score is ranked number 1 and so on.

== Most games with the black pieces ==
The player that had the black pieces the most times finishes highest on tie-breaks.

== Most wins (Baumbach) ==
The player with the most wins finishes highest on tie-breaks. This is used as the first tie-break rule for individual tournaments in ICCF.

== Kashdan ==
Invented by Isaac Kashdan, this system awards four points for a win, two points for a draw, one point for a loss, and none for an unplayed game. As a result, if players with no unplayed games tie, the one with fewer draws finishes higher on the tie-break (i.e. a win and a loss is better than two draws).

== Sonneborn–Berger score ==
Sonneborn–Berger score considers the strength of opponents each player faced, or the head to head result if the tied players have already played against each other during the tournament. If a player defeated a strong player then they get more "credit" for that win or draw. This is done by adding the scores of every opponent the player beats and half of the score of every opponent the player draws. The system was named after William Sonneborn and Johann Berger, but it was invented by Oscar Gelbfuhs. The system is the main tie-breaking system in round robin tournaments, but is also used in Swiss tournaments. It is also called the Neustadtl score.

What we call the Sonneborn–Berger system was not invented by Sonneborn or Berger, and it was not originally designed for tie-breaking. It was invented by Oscar Gelbfuhs about 1873 to be used as a weighted score in round-robin tournaments. It would be used instead of the raw score for final places. In 1886 Sonneborn criticized the system and suggested an improvement that would give a better-weighted score. His suggestion was to add the square of the player's points to the amount calculated as above. In 1887 and 1888 Berger studied Gelbfuhs' system and the suggestion of Sonneborn. This improvement became known as the Sonneborn–Berger system.

When the system is used to break ties between equally scoring players, adding in the square of the player's raw score does no good, so the Sonneborn improvement is omitted. However, the system has retained the Sonneborn–Berger name.

== Opponent's performance ==
This method uses the average performance rating of the player's opponents. The "performance rating" of a player is calculated as the rating the player would receive if they had started the tournament without a rating.

== Average rating of opposition ==
The average rating of the player's opponents.

== Brightwell Quotient ==
The Brightwell Quotient used in the World Othello Championship uses a formula based on strength of schedule and margin of victory within games; it also allows for byes. (Not relevant in games such as chess without a defined margin of victory.)

== Time of loss ==
Among tied players, the player whose first loss came last gets priority. If player A's first loss was in round 4 and player B's first loss was in round 2, player A gets priority. This was a tiebreaker used by Pokémon Organized Play in 2004-2005.

== Win percentage ==
In some tournaments where each round contains multiple games with the same opponent, a player's total game win percentage can be used as a tiebreaker. For example, this was used as the primary tiebreaker in the Pokémon GO Asia Pacific World Championships Qualifiers in 2025.

== Opponents' win percentage ==
Win-percentage tiebreakers—also referred to as resistance—are determined by evaluating the performance of a player’s opponents rather than the player’s own results. Each opponent’s record is converted into a win percentage, with wins valued at 1, draws at 0.5, and losses at 0, divided by the number of rounds played. A minimum contribution of 25% is enforced to prevent disproportionately low values from skewing results. Byes are excluded entirely: if a player receives a bye, it is ignored in calculations, and if one of their opponents received a bye, that opponent’s record is adjusted as though the bye had not occurred. Similarly, opponents who drop from the tournament are evaluated based on their final record at the time of withdrawal, with a maximum of 75%.

A player’s Opponents' Resistance is then calculated as the average of these adjusted percentages across all opponents, providing a measure of the overall strength of their competition. The related Opponents' Opponents' Resistance extends this concept by averaging the resistance values of a player’s opponents, reflecting the strength of competition faced at one additional level. This tiebreak is used by most modern Play! Pokémon Tournaments.

== Tardiness ==
If a player arrives after the first round is paired, the player loses priority. This tiebreaker was used by Pokémon Organized Play but it no longer is.

== Speed play-off games ==
The tie is broken by one or more games played with fast time control, or Fast chess.

=== Single fast game ===
FIDE rules provide for a single fast decisive game, known as Armageddon. White gets more time on the clock, but must win (i.e. a draw counts as a win for Black). The player who wins the draw of lots may choose which color they play.

== Coin flip ==
As a last resort, ties are broken by a random process such as a coin flip.

== Order of tiebreak criteria ==
Harry Golombek points out deficiencies in most of the tie-break systems and recommends a playoff if there is time. If not, he recommends Sonneborn–Berger and then the player who has the most wins. For Swiss tournaments, he recommends the Buchholz system and the Cumulative system.

For Swiss tournaments for individuals (not teams), FIDE's 2019 recommendations are:

1. Buchholz Cut 1 (the Buchholz score reduced by the lowest score of the opponents);
2. Buchholz (the sum of the scores of each of the opponents of a player);
3. The greater number of wins;
4. The greater number of wins with Black pieces, not counting forfeits.

The U.S. Chess Federation recommends these as the first four tie-breaking methods to be used:

1. Modified Median
2. Solkoff
3. Cumulative
4. Cumulative opponent's score

== See also ==
- Tiebreaker
