= Aleksandr Dronov =

Russian chess player (1946–2023)

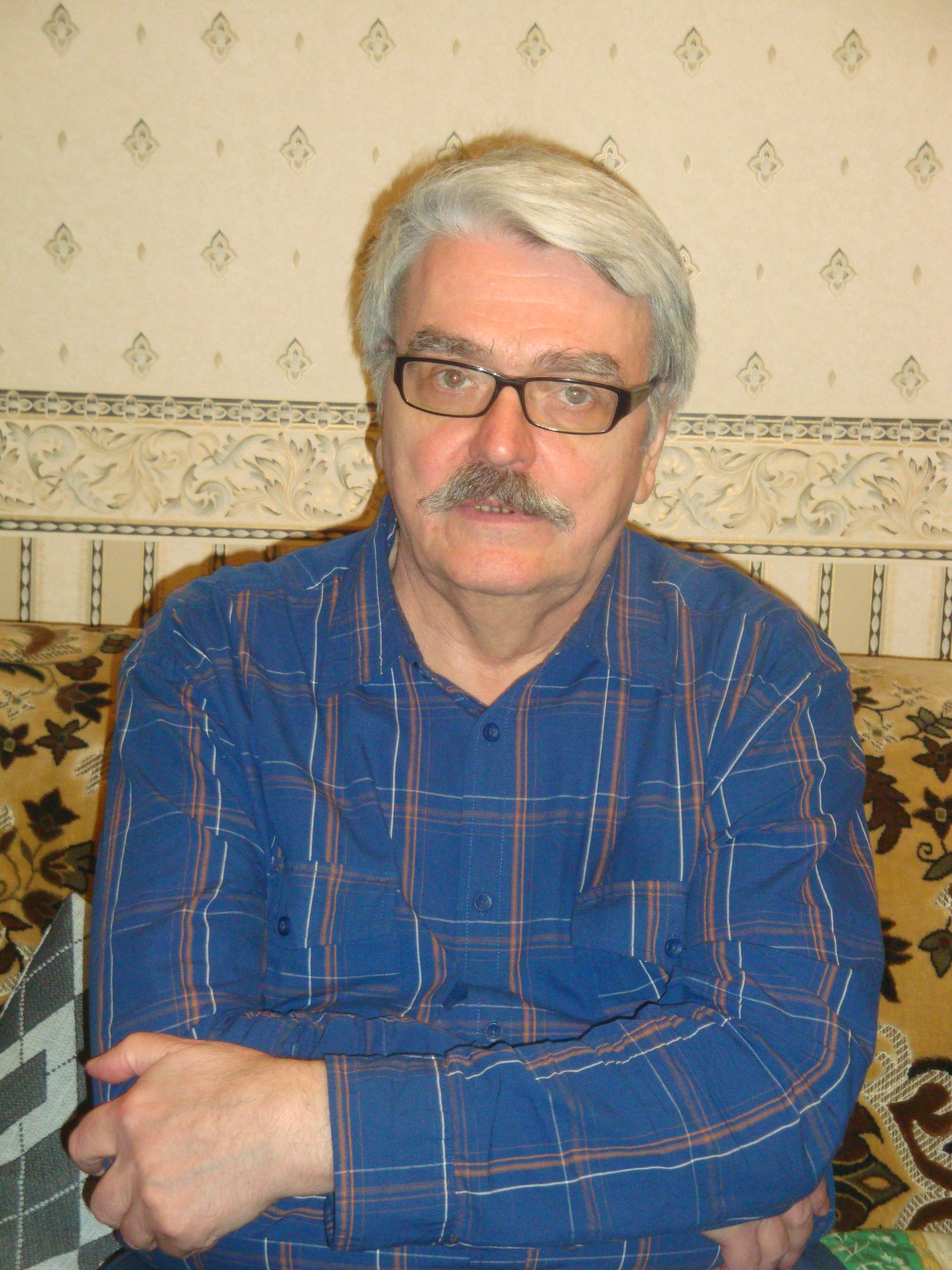
- Dronov in 2017

Personal information
- Full name: Aleksandr Surenovich Dronov
- Born: 6 October 1946 Moscow, Russian SFSR, USSR
- Died: 7 December 2023 (aged 77)

Chess career
- Country: Soviet Union; Russia
- Title: ICCF Grandmaster (2005)
- ICCF World Champion: 2007—2010, 2011—2014, 2015—2018

Aleksandr Surenovich Dronov (6 October 1946 – 7 December 2023) was a Russian International Correspondence Chess Grandmaster. He was the 22nd, 27th, and 29th World Correspondence Chess Champion. He was the only person to win the World Correspondence Chess Championship three times. Dronov died in December 2023, at the age of 77.

Preceded by Joop van Oosterom	World Correspondence Chess Championship; 2007–2010	Succeeded by Ulrich Stephan
Preceded by Ron Langeveld	World Correspondence Chess Championship; 2011–2014	Succeeded by Leonardo Ljubičić
Preceded by Leonardo Ljubičić	World Correspondence Chess Champion; 2015–2018	Succeeded by Andrey Kochemasov
