= Alessandra Riegler =

Italian chess player (born 1961)

Personal information
- Born: 24 May 1961 (age 65) Modena, Italy

Chess career
- Country: Italy
- Title: ICCF Lady Grandmaster (2005)
- ICCF World Champion: 2000–2005 (women)
- FIDE rating: 2030 (July 1997)
- Peak rating: 2050 (January 1997)
- ICCF rating: 2286 (April 2006)
- ICCF peak rating: 2286 (October 2005)

Alessandra Riegler (born 24 May 1961 in Modena) is an Italian chess player who holds the ICCF title of Lady Grandmaster (LGM).

She was the sixth ICCF Women's World Champion, a title she held from 2000 to 2005.

In 2007, Italian President Giorgio Napolitano, has awarded the title of Knight of the Order of "Merit of the Italian Republic".

Riegler is also a four-time winner of the Italian Chess Championship (1994, 1995, 1996, and 1998).

Preceded by Ljuba Kristol	Ladies World Correspondence Chess Champion; 2000–2005	Succeeded by Olga Sukhareva
