= Ron Langeveld =

Dutch chess player (born 1966)

Personal information
- Full name: Ron A. H. Langeveld
- Born: October 10, 1966 (age 59) Utrecht, Netherlands

Chess career
- Country: Netherlands
- Title: International Correspondence Chess Grandmaster (2006)
- ICCF World Champion: 2010–2014
- ICCF rating: 2660 (October 2021)
- ICCF peak rating: 2702 (January 2010)

Ron A. H. Langeveld (born October 10, 1966) is a Dutch chess player who holds the ICCF title of International Correspondence Chess Grandmaster.

== Biography ==
In 2002 Langeveld won the Dutch correspondence chess championship. In 2014 he won the 26th World Correspondence Chess Championship (2010–2014).

He graduated from the Erasmus University Rotterdam. He works as a systems engineer in a company that sells insurance software.

Preceded by (Italy) Fabio Finocchiaro	World Correspondence Chess Champion; 2010–2014	Succeeded by (Russia) Aleksandr Surenovich Dronov
