= Fabio Finocchiaro =

Italian ICCF Grandmaster

Personal information
- Born: June 5, 1939 (age 87) San Giovanni la Punta, Italy

Chess career
- Country: Italy
- Title: ICCF Grandmaster (1998)
- ICCF World Champion: 2009–13
- ICCF rating: 2571 (October 2021)
- ICCF peak rating: 2621 (January 2013)

Fabio Finocchiaro (born June 6, 1939) is an Italian chess player who holds the ICCF title of Correspondence Chess Grandmaster.

== Biography ==
He started to play chess at age 15 in his native Sicily. Since 1968 Finocchiaro actively participated in the correspondence chess tournaments. In 1977 and 1979 he twice won Italian correspondence chess championship. In 2013 Finocchiaro won the 25th World Correspondence Chess Championship (2009–2013).

Preceded by (Slovenia) Marjan Šemrl	World Correspondence Chess Champion; 2009–2013	Succeeded by (Netherlands) Ron Langeveld
