= Leonardo Ljubičić =

Croatian ICCF Grandmaster (born 1966)

Personal information
- Born: December 26, 1966 (age 59)

Chess career
- Country: Croatia
- Title: ICCF Grandmaster (2011)
- ICCF World Champion: 2013–16

Leonardo Ljubičić (born December 26, 1966) is a Croatian ICCF Grandmaster.

== Biography ==
From 1994 to 2001 Ljubičić participated in various over-the-board chess tournaments with little success. In later years he played only in Croatian team chess championships. In correspondence chess tournaments participated from late 1990s. In 2016, Ljubičić won the 28th World Correspondence Chess Championship (2013–2016).

Preceded by (Russia) Aleksandr Surenovich Dronov	World Correspondence Chess Champion; 2013–2016	Succeeded by (Russia) Aleksandr Surenovich Dronov
