= Buchholz system =

Chess ranking system

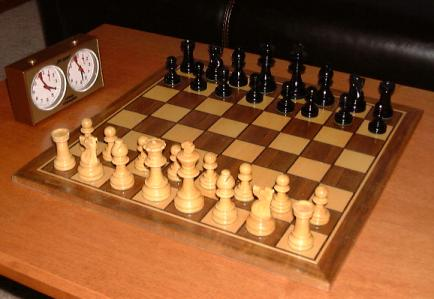
Chess game and play clock with the pieces in their initial position

The Buchholz system (also spelled Buchholtz) is a ranking or scoring system developed by Bruno Buchholz (died 1958) in 1932, for Swiss system tournaments. It was originally developed as an auxiliary scoring method, but more recently it has been used as a tie-breaking system. It was probably first used in the 1932 Bitterfeld tournament. It was designed to replace the Neustadtl score.

The method is to give each player a raw score of one point for each win and a half point for each draw. When used as an alternative scoring system, each player's Buchholz score is calculated by adding the raw scores of each of the opponents they played and multiplying this total by the player's raw score. When used for tie-breaking among players with the same raw score, no multiplying is necessary and the sum of the raw scores of the opponents played is used to break ties. When used as a tie-break system, it is equivalent to the Solkoff system.

The major criticism of this system is that tie-break scores can be distorted by the set of opponents that each player plays (especially in early rounds). To avoid this problem a version of Buchholz, the Median-Buchholz System is sometimes used. In the Median-Buchholz System the best and worst scores of a player's opponents are discarded, and the remaining scores summed.

'Buchholz cut 1' is a variant in which the score is calculated by adding together tournament scores of each opponent a player has faced, except the one with the lowest score (thus 'cut 1').

== See also ==
- Tie-breaking in Swiss-system tournaments
- Sonneborn–Berger score
