= Victor Palciauskas =

American chess player (born 1941)

Personal information
- Born: October 3, 1941 (age 84) Kaunas, Lithuania

Chess career
- Country: United States
- Title: ICCF Grandmaster (1983)
- ICCF World Champion: 1978–1984
- ICCF rating: 2479 (January 2011)
- ICCF peak rating: 2586 (October 2003)

Victor Palciauskas (born Vytautas Palčiauskas; October 3, 1941) is a Lithuania-born American chess player who holds the chess title of International Correspondence Chess Grandmaster. He was the tenth World Correspondence Chess Champion (1978–1984). From young age, Palciauskas concentrated on correspondence play. Palciauskas tied for second place (undefeated 5/8, +2−0=6) behind Mikhail Umansky in a "champion of champions" tournament, the ICCF 50 Years World Champion Jubilee. This was a special invitational correspondence tournament involving all living former ICCF World Champions.

Palciauskas received his doctorate in physics in 1969, and became a professor of physics in California.

Preceded by Tõnu Õim	World Correspondence Chess Champion; 1978–1984	Succeeded by Friedrich Baumbach
