= Marjan Šemrl =

Slovenian chess player (born 1954)

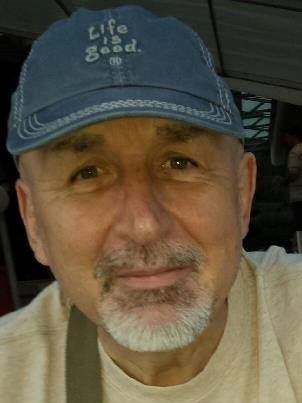

Personal information
- Born: July 18, 1954 (age 71)

Chess career
- Country: Yugoslavia; Slovenia
- Title: International Correspondence Chess Grandmaster (2007)
- ICCF World Champion: 2009–2011
- FIDE rating: 2126 (November 2019)
- Peak rating: 2240 (July 1997)
- ICCF rating: 2615 (January 2022)
- ICCF peak rating: 2617 (January 2021)

Marjan Šemrl (born July 18, 1954) is a Slovenian chess player. He is received the ICCF title of International Correspondence Chess Grandmaster in 2007.

== Early life ==
He started to play chess at the age of 18. He participated in chess tournaments in former Yugoslavia. After ten years of competition he left to fully devote himself to a professional career and family.

== Career ==
He returned to chess in 1996. In 1999 he fulfilled FIDE International Master norm and after this success was awarded the Slovenian national master title. He competed in correspondence chess tournaments beginning in 2000. In 2003 he won the Slovenia correspondence chess championship. In 2011 he won the 24th World Correspondence Chess Championship (2009–2011).

== Personal life ==
He lives in a small village near Ljubljana and works as a software development project manager. He is the married father of two daughters. He serves as vice president of Slovenia Correspondence Chess Federation Council.

Preceded by (Germany) Ulrich Stephan	World Correspondence Chess Champion; 2009–2011	Succeeded by (Italy) Fabio Finocchiaro
