= Grigory Sanakoev =

Russian chess player (1935–2021)

Personal information
- Full name: Grigory Konstantinovich Sanakoev
- Born: 17 April 1935 Voronezh, Soviet Union
- Died: 8 October 2021 (aged 86) Voronezh, Russia

Chess career
- Country: Soviet Union; Russia
- Title: ICCF Grandmaster (1984)
- ICCF World Champion: 1984–1991
- ICCF rating: 2511 (April 2014)
- ICCF peak rating: 2606 (April 2003)

Grigory Konstantinovich Sanakoev (17 April 1935 – 8 October 2021) was a Russian chess player who held the title of International Correspondence Chess Grandmaster. He was the twelfth World Correspondence Chess Championship (1984–1991) and finished in third place at the "Hans-Werner von Massow Memorial" tournament (1996–2002). Compared to his corresponce results, Sanakoev's results in over-the-board play were relatively modest. However, he won chess championship of Voronezh Region (Russia) on several occasions. Sanakoev is also the author of a book on correspondence chess titled World Champion at the Third Attempt.

Preceded by Friedrich Baumbach	World Correspondence Chess Champion; 1984–1991	Succeeded by Mikhail Umansky
