= Yakov Estrin =

Soviet chess player (1923–1987)

Personal information
- Full name: Yakov Borisovich Estrin
- Born: April 21, 1923 Moscow, RSFSR, Soviet Union
- Died: February 2, 1987 (aged 63) Moscow, Soviet Union

Chess career
- Country: Russia
- Title: International Master (1975); International Correspondence Chess Grandmaster (1966)
- ICCF World Champion: 1972–1976
- FIDE rating: 2385 (July 1986)
- Peak rating: 2450 (May 1974)

Yakov Borisovich Estrin (Russian: Я́ков Бори́сович Эстрин, April 21, 1923 – February 2, 1987) was a Russian chess player, chess theoretician, writer, and World Correspondence Chess Champion who held the chess titles of International Master and International Correspondence Chess Grandmaster.

== Chess biography ==
After a brief foray into over-the-board play, he turned to correspondence chess in the early 1960s with immediate success (joint first place in the USSR Correspondence Championship in 1962). He became an International Correspondence Chess Grandmaster in 1966, and would go on to compete in the final of the World Correspondence Championship five times. He is best known for being the seventh ICCF World Champion, 1972–1976.

For over-the-board play, he was awarded the International Master title in 1975. (Note: A few chess authors indicate the Estrin was awarded the Grandmaster title in 1984 (Gaige, Jeremy (1987), Chess Personalia, A Biobibliography, McFarland, p. 111, ISBN 978-0-7864-2353-8; Hooper, David; Whyld, Kenneth (1992), The Oxford Companion to Chess (2 ed.), Oxford University Press, p. 126, ISBN 978-0-19-280049-7). However, the 1988 book co-authored by Estrin reports only that he was an IM and ICGM (The King's Gambit, Igor Glazkov and Jakov Ėstrin, Korolevskij gambit, Moskva, Fizkultura i Sport, 1988, p. 4). Other sources including Chess: an encyclopedic dictionary, Sovyetskaya encyclopediya, Anatoly Karpov, Moscow 1990, page 511, ISBN 978-5-85270-005-6 (in Russian) and FIDE Golden book 1924–2002, Willy Iclicki, Euroadria, Slovenia, 2002, S. 92, also say Estrin was an IM and ICGM. All GM title awards in 1984 took place at the 55th FIDE Congress in Thessaloniki. The 1985 article by Nikolai Krogius, "At the FIDE Congress", 64 – Chess Review, 2/85, pp. 2–3, lists all Soviet players awarded titles at that event and Estrin is not mentioned. Another report of the Congress mentions honorary GM awards only for Stojan Puc and Eero Böök (BCM, April 1985, p. 159). Additionally, FIDE rating lists reproduced in Chess Informant during the 1984–1988 period all indicate that Estrin's title for over-the-board play was IM.)

Estrin wrote several chess books and was an authority on the Two Knights Defense. His game with Hans Berliner in which Berliner played the Two Knights Defense and defeated Estrin is one of the most famous and important games in correspondence chess. During the Soviet Era, Estrin was one of the very few chess Authors/editors that were able to publish books in the West through direct contact with the Western Publishers.

== Books ==
- The Two Knights' Defence by Yakov Estrin, Chess Ltd.; English edition (1971). (no ISBN or LOC number)
- The Two Knights' Defence by Yakov Estrin, B.T.Batsford Ltd. (1983). ISBN 0-7134-3991-2.
- Three Double King Pawn Openings by Yakov Estrin, Chess Enterprises; first edition (June 1982). ISBN 0-931462-19-3
- Gambits by Yakov B. Estrin, Chess Enterprises (June 1983). ISBN 0-931462-20-7
- The United States Correspondence Chess Championship by Yakov Estrin, Correspondence Chess League of America (1978)
- Wilkes-Barre Variation, Two Knights Defense by Yakov Estrin, Chess Enterprises (June 1978). ISBN 0-931462-00-2
- Comprehensive Chess Openings, by Yakov Estrin and Vasily Panov, in three volumes, Pergamon, 1980. ISBN 0-08-024113-1 (for set of three volumes in flexicover)
- малая дебютная знциклопедия (Translation = Concise Opening Encyclopedia), by Yakov Estrin, иэдательство физкультура и спорт (Translation = Physical Culture and Sports), 1985. (no ISBN or LOC number)
- Theorie und Praxis des Zweispringer-Spiels by J Estrin, Walter Rau Verlag. German edition (1973). ISBN 3-7919-0151-6.

== Notes ==
Preceded by (Germany) Horst Rittner	World Correspondence Chess Champion; 1972–1976	Succeeded by (Denmark) Jørn Sloth
