= Gert Jan Timmerman =

Dutch chess player

Personal information
- Born: 15 April 1956 (age 70) Netherlands

Chess career
- Country: Netherlands
- ICCF World Champion: 1996–2002

Gert Jan Timmerman (born 15 April 1956) is a Dutch chess player, most famous for being the fifteenth ICCF World Champion in correspondence chess, 1996–2002. Before becoming the fifteenth World Correspondence Champion, Timmerman won Final B of the 5th World Cup between 1987 and 1994.

He tied for second place behind Mikhail Umansky in a "champion of champions" tournament, the ICCF 50 Years World Champion Jubilee. This was a special invitational correspondence tournament involving all living former ICCF World Champions.

Preceded by (Estonia) Tõnu Õim	World Correspondence Chess Champion; 1996–2002	Succeeded by (Turkey) Tunç Hamarat
