= Tõnu Õim =

Estonian chess player

Personal information
- Born: 16 June 1941 (age 85) Raasiku, Estonia

Chess career
- Country: Soviet Union; Estonia
- Title: ICCF Grandmaster (1981)
- ICCF World Champion: 1977–1983; 1994–1999
- FIDE rating: 2330 (July 2023)
- Peak rating: 2410 (July 1994)
- ICCF rating: 2581 (April 2005)
- ICCF peak rating: 2617 (April 2000)

Tõnu Õim (born 16 June 1941) is an Estonian grandmaster of correspondence chess, most famous for being the first to have won the ICCF World Championship twice, in 1983 and 1999. In 1991 he won the Axelson Memorial. In over-the-board play, he was awarded the Soviet Master title in 1966. He does not hold a FIDE title for over-the-board play; however, his peak FIDE rating of 2410 indicates a player of International Master strength.

== Notable games ==
- Tonu Oim vs. Grigory Konstantinovich Sanakoev, 50th World Champions Jubilee Tournament 2003, Sicilian Defense: Najdorf Variation, English Attack (B90), 1–0
- Tonu Oim vs. Juan Sebastian Morgado, 14th CC World Ch Final 1994, Four Knights Game: Scotch Variation. Accepted (C47), 1–0

Preceded by Jørn Sloth	World Correspondence Chess Champion; 1977–1983	Succeeded by Victor Palciauskas
Preceded by Mikhail Umansky	World Correspondence Chess Champion; 1994–1999	Succeeded by Gert Jan Timmerman
