= Christian Muck =

Austrian chess player

Christian Muck is an Austrian chess player. He won the 31st World Correspondence Chess Championship in 2022.
