= Friedrich Baumbach =

German chess player (1935–2025)

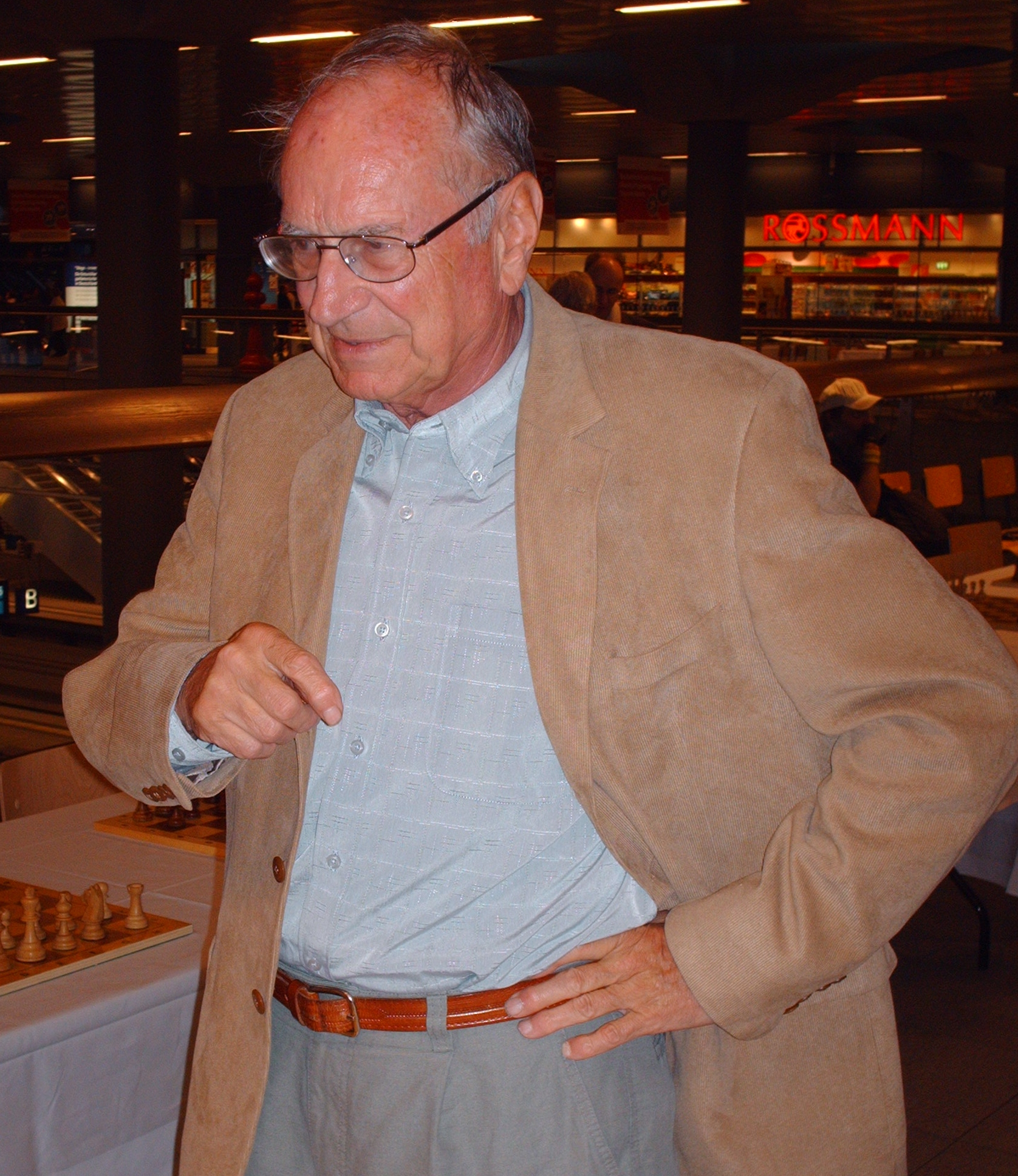
- Baumbach in 2008

Personal information
- Born: 8 September 1935 Weimar, Gau Thuringia, Germany
- Died: 24 April 2025 (aged 89) Berlin, Germany

Chess career
- Country: Germany
- Title: ICCF Grandmaster (1973); FIDE Master (1985)
- ICCF World Champion: 1983–89
- FIDE rating: 2131 (October 2021)
- Peak rating: 2460 (July 1971)
- ICCF rating: 2399 (October 2021)
- ICCF peak rating: 2562 (July 1994)

Friedrich (Fritz) Baumbach (8 September 1935 – 24 April 2025) was a German International Correspondence Chess Grandmaster, most famous for being the eleventh ICCF World Champion from 1983 to 1989. He was also East German Champion in 1970.

== Biography ==
Baumbach tied for second place behind Mikhail Umansky in a "champion of champions" tournament, the ICCF 50 Years World Champion Jubilee. This was a special invitational correspondence tournament involving all living former ICCF World Champions.

He was a chemist by profession. He received his doctorate in 1966. From 2000 he worked as a freelance patent attorney.

Baumbach died in Berlin on 24 April 2025, at the age of 89.

Preceded by Victor Palciauskas	World Correspondence Chess Champion; 1983–1989	Succeeded by Grigory Sanakoev
