= McMahon system tournament =

Tournament system

A McMahon system tournament is a tournament design for games such as go and chess that attempts to generalize and improve upon the Swiss system. As in a Swiss tournament, all players compete in the same number of rounds against various other players. Unlike Swiss, the players do not all start with zero points, but are awarded initial points based on their rating prior to the tournament. This gives starting advantage to higher rated players, but they will play tougher opponents from the very start. The system features an "upper bar", set to a specific rating, so that all players rated above that are considered to have a chance to win the tournament, and start with the same number of points.

McMahon pairing matches players in each round against opponents that have equal or almost equal numbers of points so far. Players gain a point for each round they win or half a point for a draw. The player with the highest number of points after the last round is the tournament winner. Some set of tie-breaking rules must be chosen in advance to be applied if two or more players achieve the same number of points.

The system is named after Lee McMahon of Bell Labs, and was originally used as a club ranking system at the New York Go Club. It was then adopted for Go tournaments in Britain, and has since become the most popular tournament system used in Go. Use of the McMahon system does not determine policy on other tournament questions such as whether to pair players from the same club, whether to use accelerated pairings, whether Go games should be even or handicap, etc.

The advantage of the McMahon system over the Swiss system is that it requires fewer rounds to find a winner, and that it avoids extreme match-ups (very strong players against very weak players) in the earlier rounds. By matching up possible tournament winners earlier, the system allows for more games amongst this group, and thus improves sampling. In other words, the sorting effect of wins and losses propelling players up and down is applied all along to refine what is believed to be an acceptable initial ordering rather than being wasted merely to bring similarly skilled players together into roughly sorted order, and thus the McMahon system achieves a more accurate final sorted order. It also is said to deliver better playing experiences to players at all levels.
