= Joop van Oosterom =

Dutch billionaire and chess player (1937–2016)

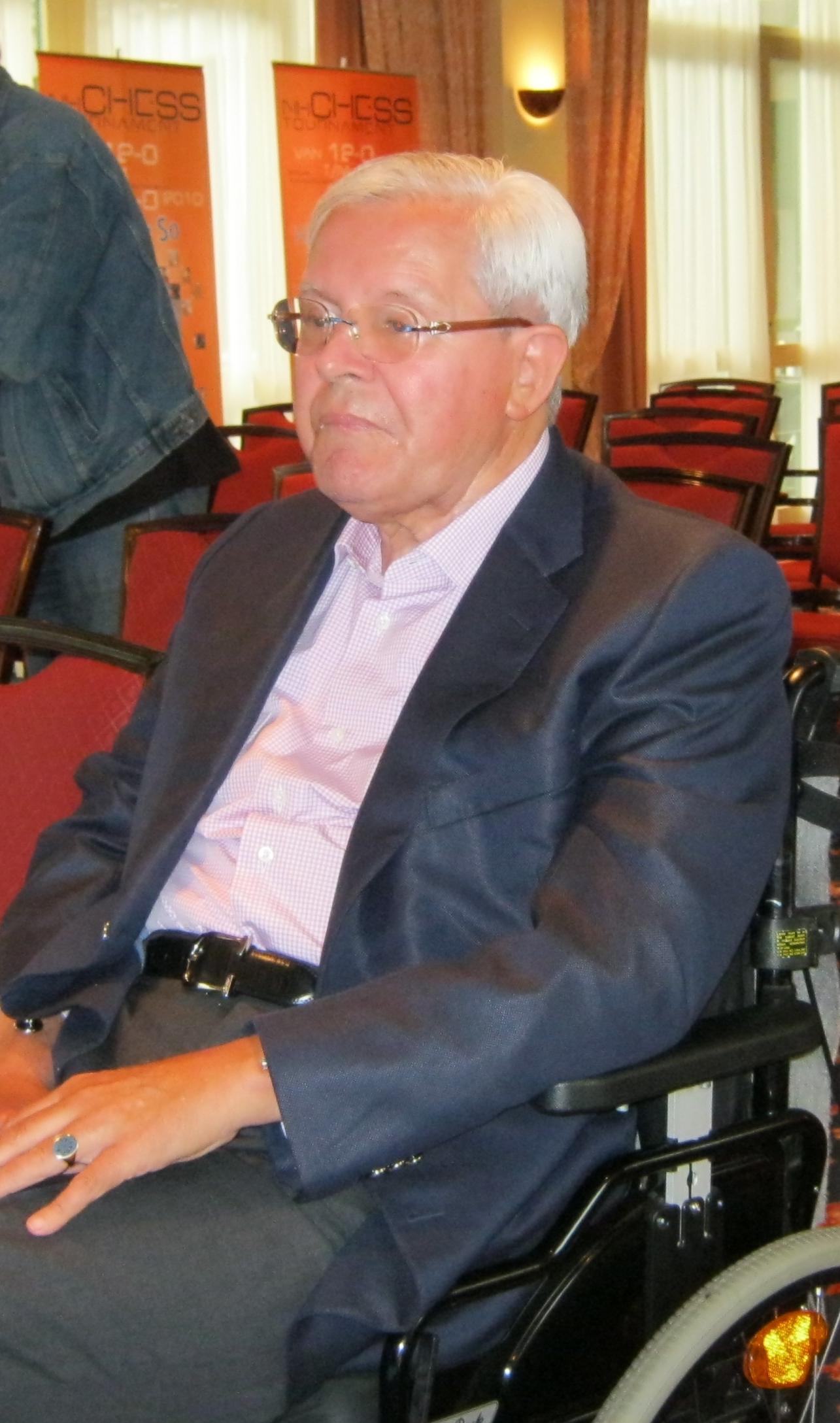

Personal information
- Born: 12 December 1937 Hilversum, North Holland, Netherlands
- Died: 22 October 2016 (age 78) Monaco

Chess career
- Country: Netherlands
- ICCF World Champion: 2003, 2005
- Peak rating: 2260 (July 1971)

Joop van Oosterom (12 December 1937 – 22 October 2016) was a Dutch billionaire, chess and billiards sponsor, and twice correspondence chess world champion. His fortune, made with the Volmac Software Group, was estimated by Dutch financial magazine Quote at €1.1 billion at the time of his death.

From 1992 to 2011 he staged the annual Melody Amber chess tournament in Monaco, where world-class Grandmasters played rapid and blindfold games. It is named after his first daughter Melody Amber. His other daughter was the eponym to the Crystal Kelly Cup, an invitational tournament for three-cushion carom billiards, which has been held between 1994 and 2011 mostly in Monte Carlo and Nice. He also sponsored the Women–Veterans chess tournaments from 1992 to 2001.

Van Oosterom was a strong correspondence chess player, but suffered a severe brain haemorrhage in 1993. Nevertheless, he concluded the world correspondence chess championship successfully and became the 18th World Champion in Correspondence Chess in 2005. This achievement, however, has been criticized, as at the time of the championship van Oosterom had hired the strong grandmaster Jeroen Piket as his personal secretary. Earlier, van Oosterom had had two Dutch International Masters on his payroll whose job was to analyse his correspondence games. Chess author Tim Krabbé wrote: "The Turk was operated by William Schlumberger, Mephisto was operated by Isidore Gunsberg, Ajeeb was operated by Harry Pillsbury and Joop van Oosterom is operated by Jeroen Piket." Van Oosterom also won the 21st World Championship Final in Correspondence Chess in 2008.

In February 2017 it was announced that van Oosterom had died in October 2016. No cause of death was announced and it is not clear why it was kept secret.

Preceded by (Norway) Ivar Bern	World Correspondence Chess Champion; 2003–2005	Succeeded by (France) Christophe Léotard
Preceded by (Finland) Pertti Lehikoinen	World Correspondence Chess Champion; 2005–2008	Succeeded by (Russia) Aleksandr Surenovich Dronov
