= Jørn Sloth =

Danish chess player (born 1944)

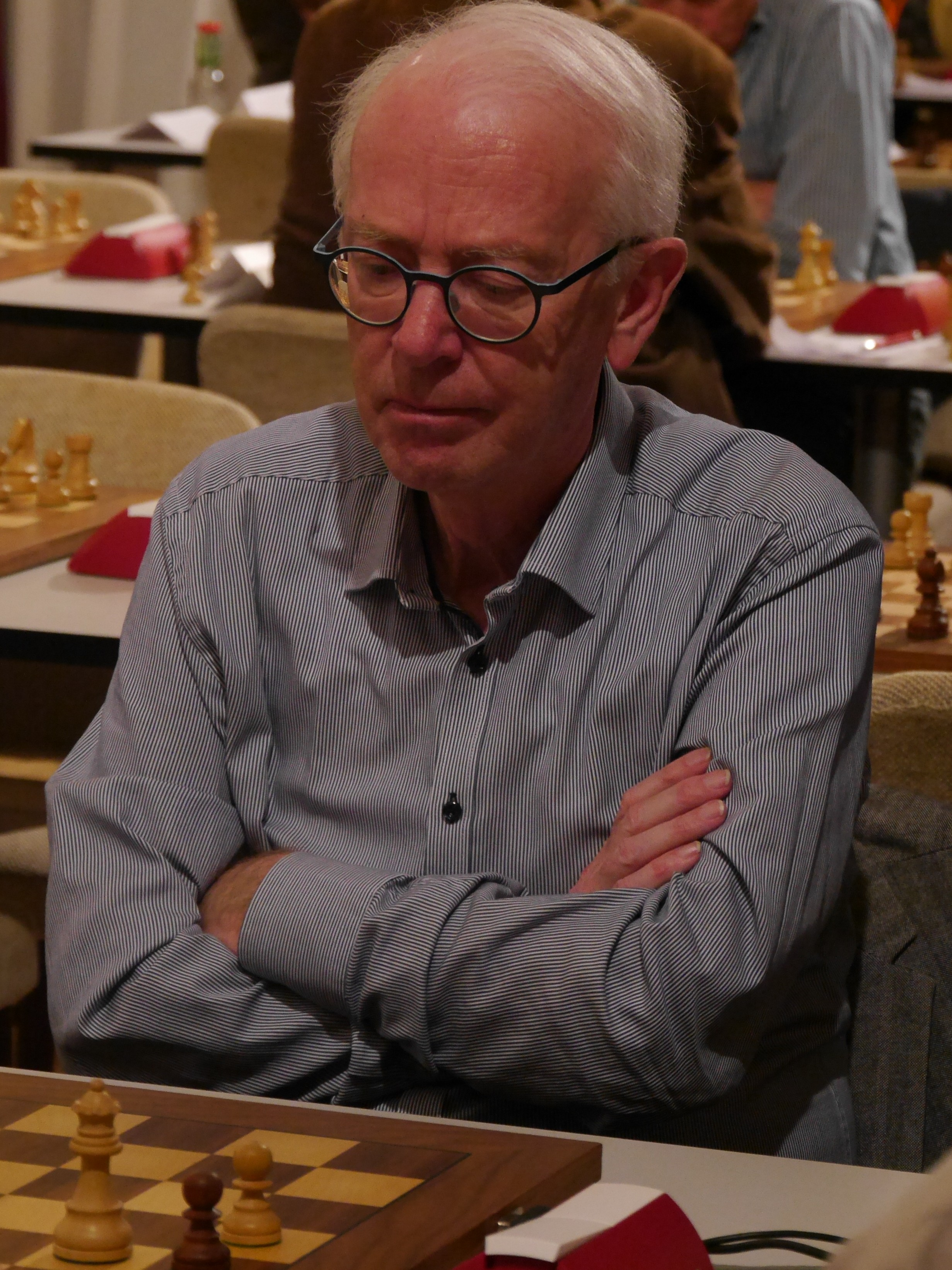
- World Chess Championship for Seniors, 2016

Personal information
- Born: 5 September 1944 (age 81) Sjørring, Thy, Denmark

Chess career
- Country: Denmark
- Title: ICCF Grandmaster (1978); FIDE Master (1983)
- ICCF World Champion: 1975–80
- FIDE rating: 2296 (October 2020)
- Peak rating: 2400 (January 1979)
- ICCF rating: 2532 (April 2007)
- ICCF peak rating: 2635 (July 1991)

Jørn Sloth (born 5 September 1944 in Sjørring, Thy, Denmark) is a Danish chess player who holds the chess titles of FIDE Master and Correspondence Chess Grandmaster. He was the eighth ICCF World Champion, 1975–1980.

In 1964 he, together with Rob Hartoch, won the Niemeyer tournament for European players under 20.

Sloth started playing Correspondence Chess at a young age. He obtained the IMC title in 1973 and the GMC title in 1978. He was the youngest player ever to win the Correspondence World Champion title.

Preceded by (Soviet Union) Yakov Estrin	World Correspondence Chess Champion; 1975–1980	Succeeded by (Estonia) Tõnu Õim
