= Vladimir Zagorovsky =

Russian chess grandmaster (1925–1994)

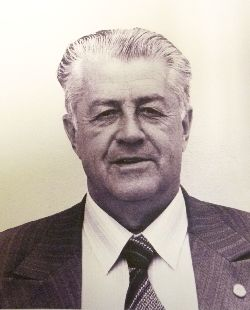

Personal information
- Full name: Vladimir Pavlovich Zagorovsky
- Born: 29 June 1925 Voronezh, USSR
- Died: 6 November 1994 (aged 69) Voronezh, Russia

Chess career
- Country: Russia
- Title: International Correspondence Chess Grandmaster (1965)
- ICCF World Champion: 1962–1965
- FIDE rating: 2370 (July 1972)
- ICCF rating: 2452 (July 1996)
- ICCF peak rating: 2590 (July 1991)

Vladimir Pavlovich Zagorovsky (Russian: Влади́мир Па́влович Загоро́вский; 29 June 1925, Voronezh, Russia, formerly USSR – 6 November 1994, Voronezh, Russia) was a Russian chess grandmaster of correspondence chess. He is most famous for being the fourth ICCF World Champion between 1962 and 1965. He won the 1952 Moscow City Championship and finished 2nd in the 1951 championship. In the July 1972 FIDE rating list he had an over the board rating of 2370. His brother Mikhail Zagorovsky was also a chess master.

== Selected titles ==
- 1948: Master of Sports of the USSR (chess)
- 1991: Honored Master of Sports of the USSR (chess)

== Books ==
- Zagororovsky, Vladimir (1982). Romantic Chess Openings. ISBN 0713436239. OCLC 9972859.

== Notes and references ==
=== References ===
- Hooper, David; Whyld, Kenneth (1987) [1984]. The Oxford Companion to Chess. Oxford University Press. p. 384. ISBN 0192819860. OCLC 1158758799.
- Karpov, Anatoly Yevgenyevich, ed. (1990). "1948: В. Загоровский" [1948: V. Zagorovsky] (PDF). Шахматы: Энциклопедический Словарь (Russian Chess Encyclopedia and Biographical Dictionary) (in Russian). Moscow: Great Soviet Encyclopedia. ISBN 5852700053. OCLC 606026618.
- "FIDE Rating List: July 1972". OlimpBase – The Encyclopedia of Team Chess.

Preceded by (Belgium) Albéric O'Kelly de Galway	World Correspondence Chess Champion; 1962–1965	Succeeded by (United States) Hans Berliner
