= Christophe Léotard =

French chess player

Personal information
- Born: 1966 (age 59–60) Amiens, France

Chess career
- Country: France

Christophe Léotard (born 1966, in Amiens) is a French correspondence chess grandmaster and the 19th World Champion in Correspondence Chess. He obtained 8.5 points (+5 =7) in the championship (a category XV tournament), which started on 20 April 2004.

Preceded by (Netherlands) Joop van Oosterom	World Correspondence Chess Champion; 2004–2008	Succeeded by Pertti Lehikoinen
