= World Correspondence Chess Championship =

Chess competition

The World Correspondence Chess Championship determines the World Champion in correspondence chess. Men and women of any age are eligible to contest the title. The official World Correspondence Chess Championship is managed by the International Correspondence Chess Federation (ICCF).

The world championship comprises four stages: Preliminaries, Semi-Finals, Candidates' Tournament, and Final. ICCF tournament rules define which players can access each stage. The first-, second- and third-placed finishers from the previous Final, and the first- and second-placed finishers from the Candidates' Tournaments have access to the World Correspondence Chess Championship Final.

The ICCF also manages the Ladies World Correspondence Chess Championships, that comprises Semi-Finals and Final.

== World Champions ==
Dates given are the period in which the final of the championship took place, as given on the ICCF website.

N°	Years	Champion	Runner-up
01.	1950–1953	(Australia) Cecil Purdy	(Sweden) Harald Malmgren
02.	1956–1959	(Soviet Union) Viacheslav Ragozin	(Australia) Lucius Endzelins
03.	1959–1962	(Belgium) Albéric O'Kelly de Galway	(Soviet Union) Piotr Dubinin
04.	1962–1965	(Soviet Union) Vladimir Zagorovsky	(Soviet Union) Georgy Borisenko
05.	1965–1968	(United States) Hans Berliner	(Czechoslovakia) Jaroslav Hybl
06.	1968–1971	(Germany) Horst Rittner	(Soviet Union) Vladimir Zagorovsky
07.	1972–1976	(Soviet Union) Yakov Estrin	(Belgium) Jozef Boey
08.	1975–1980	(Denmark) Jørn Sloth	(Soviet Union) Vladimir Zagorovsky
09.	1977–1983	(Soviet Union) Tõnu Õim	(East Germany) Fritz Baumbach
10.	1978–1984	(United States) Victor Palciauskas	(Argentina) Juan Morgado
11.	1983–1989	(East Germany) Fritz Baumbach	(Soviet Union) Gennadi Nesis
12.	1984–1991	(Soviet Union) Grigory Sanakoev	(Slovakia) Josef Franzen
13.	1989–1998	(Soviet Union) Mikhail Umansky	(Denmark) Eric Bang
14.	1994–2000	(Estonia) Tõnu Õim	(Denmark) Ove Ekebjaerg
15.	1996–2002	(Netherlands) Gert Jan Timmerman	(Netherlands) Joop van Oosterom
16.	1999–2004	(Turkey) Tunç Hamarat	(Netherlands) Rudolf Maliangkay
17.	2002–2007	(Norway) Ivar Bern	(Germany) Wolfgang Rohde
18.	2003–2005	(Netherlands) Joop van Oosterom	(Germany) Hans Elwert
19.	2004–2007	(France) Christophe Léotard	(Germany) Frank Gerhardt
20.	2004–2011	(Finland) Pertti Lehikoinen	(Sweden) Stefan Winge
21.	2005–2008	(Netherlands) Joop van Oosterom	(Canada) Alexander Ugge
22.	2007–2010	(Russia) Aleksandr Dronov	(Germany) Jürgen Bücker
23.	2007–2010	(Germany) Ulrich Stephan	(Germany) Thomas Winckelmann
24.	2009–2011	(Slovenia) Marjan Šemrl	(Germany) Hans-Dieter Wunderlich
25.	2009–2013	(Italy) Fabio Finocchiaro	(England) Richard Hall
26.	2010–2014	(Netherlands) Ron Langeveld	(Romania) Florin Serban
27.	2011–2014	(Russia) Aleksandr Dronov	(Germany) Matthias Kribben
28.	2013–2016	(Croatia) Leonardo Ljubičić	(Portugal) Horacio Neto
29.	2015–2018	(Russia) Aleksandr Dronov	(Poland) Jacek Oskulski
30.	2017–2019	(Russia) Andrey Kochemasov	(Russia) Enver Efendiyev (Germany) Detlef Buse (Germany) Fred Kunzelmann
31.	2019–2022	(Netherlands) Ron Langeveld (Austria) Christian Muck (Poland) Fabian Stanach	N/A
32.	2020–2022	(United States) Jon Edwards	(France) Michel Lecroq (Russia) Sergey Adolfovich Osipov (Portugal) Horácio Neto
33.	2022–2025	(Spain) Javier Ros Padilla (Peru) Angel Acevedo Villalba (Turkey) Tansel Turgut (Germany) Olaf Hesse (Russia) Valery Aleksandrov (Czech Republic) Pavel Sváček (Russia) Ivan Panitevsky (Russia) Mikhail Churkin (Italy) Tiziano Mosconi (United States) Daniel M. Fleetwood	N/A

== Ladies World Champions ==
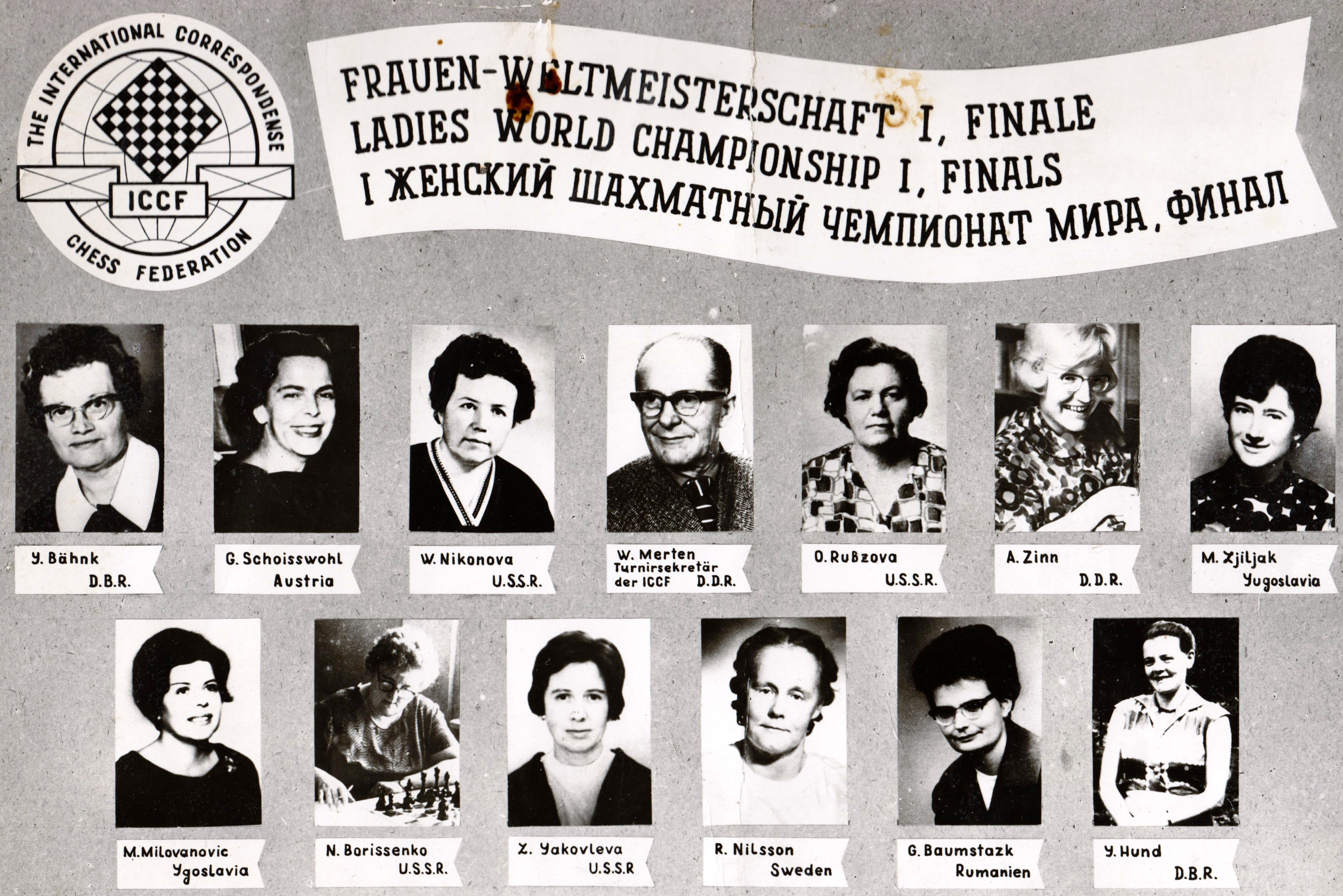
First World Championship (1968/71)

N°	Years	Champion	Runner-up
01.	1968–1972	(Soviet Union) Olga Rubtsova	(Austria) Gertrude Schoisswohl
02.	1972–1977	(Soviet Union) Lora Jakovleva	(Soviet Union) Olga Rubtsova
03.	1978–1984	(Israel) Ljuba Kristol	(Soviet Union) Merike Rotova
04.	1984–1992	(Soviet Union) Liudmila Belavenets	(Soviet Union) Nina Orlova
05.	1993–1998	(Israel) Ljuba Kristol	(Latvia) Ingrida Priedite
06.	2000–2005	(Italy) Alessandra Riegler	(Croatia) Maja Zelcic
07.	2002–2006	(Russia) Olga Sukhareva	(England) Mary Jones
08.	2007–2010	(Russia) Olga Sukhareva	(Czech Republic) Marie Bazantová
09.	2011–2014	(Russia) Irina Perevertkina	(Russia) Maria Lisitcina
10.	2014–2017	(Russia) Irina Perevertkina	(Ukraine) Tetiana Moyseenko
11.	2017–2020	(Russia) Irina Perevertkina	(Lithuania) Vilma Dambrauskaitè (Ukraine) Tetiana Moyseenko
11.	2020–2023	(Russia) Irina Perevertkina	(England) Dawn L. Williamson (Ukraine) Tetiana Yurchuk (Germany) Victoria Schweer (Italy) Luz Marina Tinjacá Ramirez

== ICCF World Cup ==
Nr.	Years	Champion
01.	1973–1977	(Germany) Karl Maeder
02.	1977–1983	(Soviet Union) Gennadi Nesis
03.	1981–1986	(Soviet Union) Nikolai Rabinovich
04.	1984–1989	(Soviet Union) Albert Popov
5A.	1987–1994	(Ukraine) Alexandr Frolov
5B.	1987–1994	(Netherlands) Gert Timmerman
06.	1994–1999	(Latvia) Olita Rause
07.	1994–2001	(Ukraine) Alexei Lepikhov
08.	1998–2002	(Germany) Horst Staudler
09.	1998–2001	(Germany) Edgar Prang
10.	2001–2005	(Germany) Frank Schroder
11.	2008–2011	(Germany) Reinhardt Moll
12E	2005–2007	(Germany) Reinhardt Moll
12P	2009–2013	(Germany) Matthias Gleichmann
13.	2009–2012	(Germany) Reinhardt Moll
14.	2009–2012	(Germany) Reinhardt Moll
15.	2012–2015	(Slovenia) Klemen Sivic
16.	2013–2016	(Germany) Uwe Nogga
17.	2014–2017	(Germany) Matthias Gleichmann
18.	2015–2019	(Germany) Reinhard Moll (Germany) Stefan Ulbig
19.	2014–2016	(Germany) Thomas Herfurth
20.	2017–2020	(Russia) Sergey Kishkin
21.	2019–2021	(Germany) Matthias Gleichmann
22.	2021–2023	(Germany) Matthias Gleichmann (Russia) Dmitry Viktorovich Morozov

== ICCF Chess 960 World Cup ==
Nr.	Years	Champion
01.	2014–2015	(Poland) Fabian Stanach
02.	2015–2016	(Slovenia) Darko Babič
03.	2016–2018	(France) Jean Banet
04.	2018–2019	(Russia) Ivan Panitevsky
05.	2019–2021	(Russia) Aleksey Voll
06.	2020–2022	(Russia) Aleksey Voll
07.	2020–2021	(Russia) Evgeny Tsygankov
08.	2021–2023	(United States) Paul Muljadi (Romania) Tudor Ristea
09.	2022–2023	(Russia) Viktor Aleksandrovich Pavlov (Switzerland) Daniel A. Weber-Widmer (Russia) Vladimir Dobroselskiy (Ukraine) Igor Korovnik (Spain) Antonio Sánchez Ródenas (Russia) Aleksey Voll (Russia) Dmitry Viktorovich Morozov (Germany) Norbert Lukas
10.	2023–2024	(Spain) Alberto Pérez López (Denmark) Hans-Christian Lykke

== See also ==
- World Chess Championship
