= Olga Sukhareva =

Russian chess player (born 1963)

Personal information
- Born: Olga Mikhailovna Sukhareva; 15 March 1963 (age 63) Orenburg, Russia

Chess career
- Country: Russia
- Title: ICCF International Master (2014); ICCF Lady Grandmaster (2006); Woman FIDE Master (1999); FIDE Arbiter (2021)
- ICCF World Champion: 2002–2006 (women); 2007–2010 (women)
- FIDE rating: 2112 (October 2003)
- Peak rating: 2135 (July 2000)
- ICCF rating: 2372 (January 2015)
- ICCF peak rating: 2383 (January 2012)

Olga Mikhailovna Sukhareva (Russian: Ольга Михайловна Сухарева, born 15 March 1963 in Orenburg) is a Russian female chess player who holds the ICCF titles of International Master (IM, 2014) and Lady Grandmaster (LGM, 2006) and the FIDE titles of Woman FIDE Master (WFM) and FIDE Arbiter (FA, 2021). She was the seventh and eighth Ladies World Correspondence Chess Champion.

Preceded by Alessandra Riegler	Ladies World Correspondence Chess Champion; 2002–2006	Succeeded by Olga Sukhareva
Preceded by Olga Sukhareva	Ladies World Correspondence Chess Champion; 2007–2010	Succeeded by Irina Perevertkina
