= Mendheim =

Mendheim may refer to:

- Brady E. Mendheim Jr. (born 1968), Associate Justice of the Supreme Court of Alabama
- Florence Mendheim (1899–1984), New York Public Library librarian notable for her undercover surveillance of American Nazi groups in the 1930s
- Julius Mendheim (ca. 1788–1836), German chess master and problemist
