= Derounian =

Derounian is a surname. Notable people with the surname include:

- Arthur Derounian (1909–1991), Armenian-American journalist and writer
- Steven Derounian (1918–2007), American politician
