= Arno Nickel =

German chess player (born 1952)

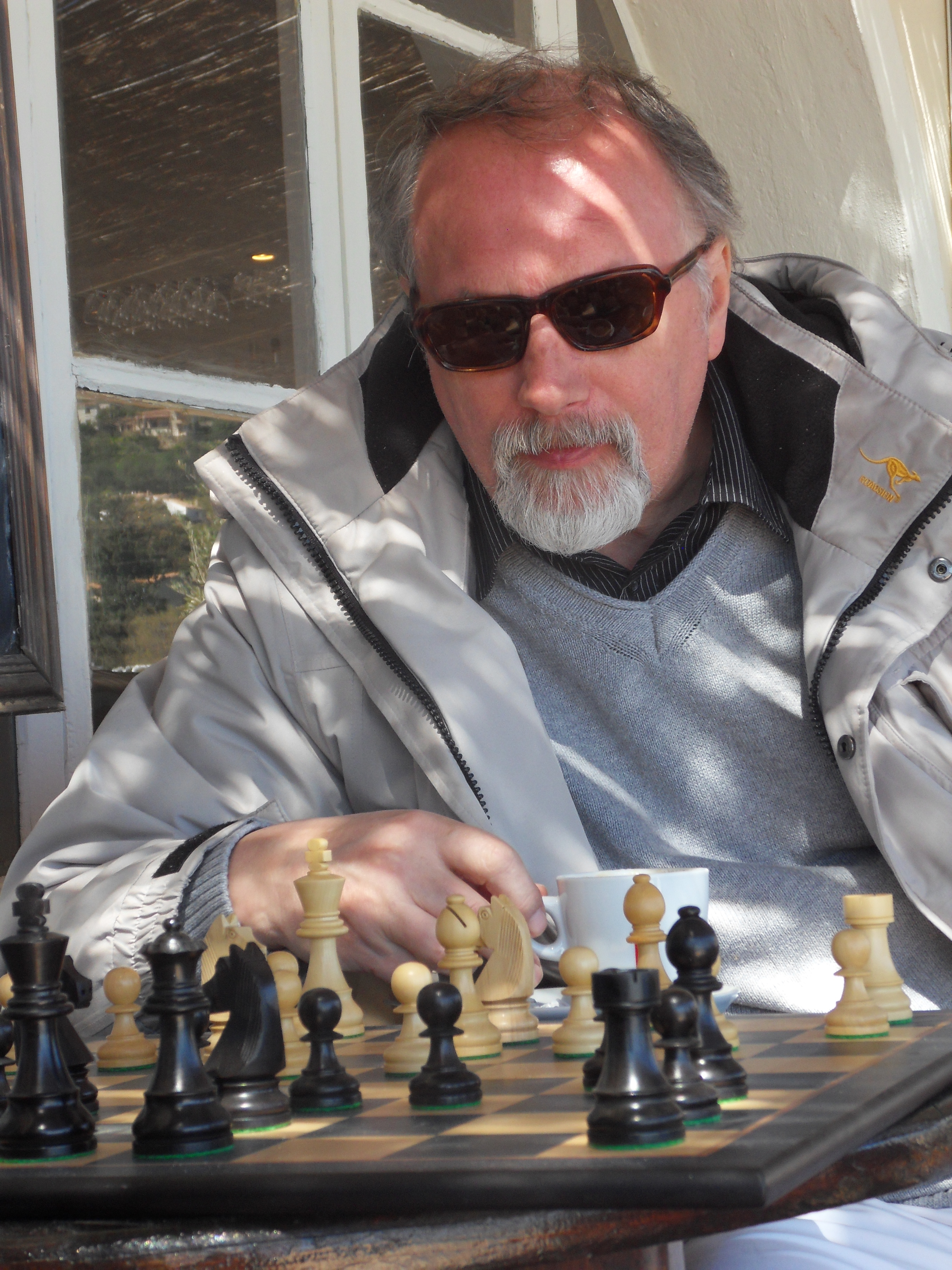

Personal information
- Born: February 15, 1952 (age 74)

Chess career
- Country: Germany
- Title: International Correspondence Chess Grandmaster (2001)
- Peak rating: 2128 (May 2010)

Arno Nickel (born February 15, 1952) is a German correspondence chess Grandmaster and a well-known German chess publisher.

== Biography ==
Arno lives in Berlin, which is also where his publishing company Edition Marco is located.

Since 1983 he has edited the German Schach-Kalender, as well as the "Schach-Journal" together with Alexander Koblencs, former trainer of Mikhail Tal, from 1991 to 1994. He has published numerous books on chess, usually in German language with the exception of Robert Hübner's "Twenty-five Annotated Games" (1996).

Since 2005 Nickel has been promoting Freestyle Chess (Advanced chess, created by GM Garry Kasparov), a new kind of online chess competition with computer-assisted play where almost anything is allowed, including help from other players.

In a correspondence match lasting many months, he won two games and drew a third against Hydra, the most powerful chess supercomputer in the world at that time (2005).

Since 2008 Nickel has promoted the Infinity Chess project, which is located in Abu Dhabi. Amongst other projects Infinity Chess has dedicated itself to Freestyle chess, supporting four play modes: human, engine, centaur (human + engine) and correspondence chess.

On February 16, 2009 Nickel won the Simon Webb Memorial, a category 15 correspondence chess event with 13 grandmasters.

In the ICCF Champions League top group A, season 2007–2009, he achieved the best result on board 1.

In 2011 Nickel won the gold medal with the German Olympic team in the Final of the 17th ICCF Correspondence Chess Olympiad. He scored 8/12 and achieved the best result on board 3. 2016 he achieved his second olympic gold at board 4, and 2019 his third gold medal with the best performance at board 2.

With an Elo of 2626 his ranking in the January 2020 ICCF rating list is No. 9 in the World.

Nickel has published various articles on computer chess, correspondence chess and chess history. 2018 he published in German his detailed research on the beginnings of organised chess in Berlin around 1800-1830s, featuring Julius Mendheim, who is considered the best player in Berlin and probably Germany at his time; "Julius Mendheim. Auf den Spuren eines genialen Schachmeisters des frühen 19. Jahrhunderts".

== See also ==
- Advanced Chess
