= Advanced chess =

Chess with computer assistance

Advanced chess is a form of chess in which each human player uses a computer chess engine to explore the possible results of candidate moves. With this computer assistance, the human player controls and decides the game.

Also called cyborg chess or centaur chess, advanced chess was introduced for the first time by grandmaster Garry Kasparov, with the aim of bringing together human and computer skills to achieve the following results:

- increasing the level of play to heights never before seen in chess;
- producing blunder-free games with the qualities and the beauty of both perfect tactical play and highly meaningful strategic plans;
- offering the public an overview of the mental processes of strong human chess players and powerful chess computers, and the combination of their forces.

A variant or superset of advanced chess is freestyle chess, in which teams are also allowed, and every possible form of consultation is allowed within the established time limits. Freestyle chess was introduced by Ingo Althoefer and Timo Klaustermeyer with a Blitz tournament in August 2004.

== History ==
The concept was already common in the 1970s: "An interesting possibility which arises from the 'brute force' capabilities of contemporary chess programs is the introduction of a new brand of 'consultation chess' where the partnership is between man and machine." The concept of computer-assisted chess tournaments originated in science fiction, notably in The Peace War, written by Vernor Vinge in 1984.

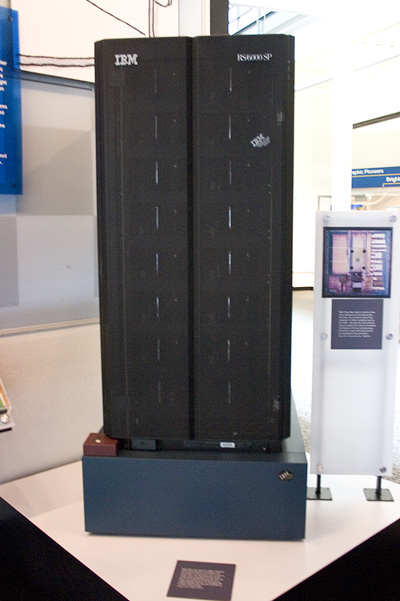
Deep Blue

The former world champion grandmaster Garry Kasparov, who retired from competitive chess in 2005, has a long history in playing "Man vs. Machine" events. Among the most important are his matches against IBM's computer Deep Blue, which Kasparov defeated in February 1996, scoring 4–2 in a 6-game match, and lost to 3 1/2–2 1/2 in a May 1997 rematch. This 1997 match was famous, as it was the first time in the history of chess in which a computer had defeated a world champion. After this spectacular match, and many other matches against computers, Garry Kasparov had the idea to invent a new form of chess in which humans and computers co-operate, instead of contending with each other. Kasparov named this form of chess "advanced chess".

The first advanced chess event was held in June 1998 in León, Spain. It was played between Garry Kasparov and Veselin Topalov, who used Fritz 5 and ChessBase 7.0. It was a 6-game match, and it was arranged in advance that the players would consult the built-in million-games databases only for the 3rd and 4th game, and would only use analytical engines without consulting the databases for the remaining games. The time available to each player during the games was 60 minutes. The match ended in a 3–3 tie. After the match, Kasparov said:

My prediction seems to be true: In Advanced Chess, it's all over once someone gets a won position. This experiment was exciting and helped spectators understand what's going on. It was quite enjoyable and will take a very big and prestigious place in the history of chess.

Even in the following years, advanced chess events were held in León. The Indian grandmaster Viswanathan Anand won three consecutive tournaments in 1999, 2000, and 2001, before losing the title to Vladimir Kramnik in 2002. After the loss to Kramnik, Anand said:

I think in general; people tend to overestimate the importance of the computer in the competitions. You can do a lot of things with the computer, but you still have to play good chess. I more or less managed to do so except for this third game. In such a short match against a very solid and hard-to-beat opponent, this turned out to be too much, but I don’t really feel like the computer alone can change the objective true to the position.

== Gameplay ==
Both players sit in a typical chess-playing room, equipped with fast computers of equal hardware strength. The tournament organizers are responsible for making sure that the players are familiar with the pertinent hardware and software. Unlike traditional face-to-face chess, the players usually face their respective computers. Each player is typically allotted one hour of thinking time (as was the time control used in all advanced chess events in León), though the particular tournament regulations may vary regarding this matter.

During the match, the players will typically form strategic plans in their minds, then enter the candidate sequences of moves into the computer to analyze and make sure there are no blunders and other possible holes. After seeing the computer's analysis, the human player will compare each candidate sequence's merits and may even introduce a new variation if time permits. The player will typically play out the move he or she has established (with computer help) to be strongest. If there are two or more moves which the computer considers to be of equal strength (such situations are frequent), the human player will use their own strategic skills, experience, and analytical judgment capabilities to decide which move to play. The humans are in charge during the whole match, and are formally free to play any moves they consider the best, at their own discretion. During the opening, the players may consult a large database of opening moves and variations, containing information about who played a particular variation, when it was played, and with what success. However, a particular tournament's rules may prohibit using databases in such a manner.

During the whole game, the players' computer monitors are projected onto large screens, making it possible for the viewing audience to watch how the strongest players decide their moves and make their plans. Typically, there will be a commentator in a separate room, equipped with the identical hardware as players, who will provide commentary to the audience—this way, the audience is given real insight into the thought processes of the strongest players.

Although advanced chess play is at the highest Elo rating level when performed by the top grandmasters, it is not limited to them. Anyone can play advanced chess, sometimes with the same success as the strongest grandmasters. Occasionally, average players have been able to achieve a performance higher than that of computer programs and top grandmasters.

== Teams ==
Due to the peculiarities of the human–computer team, it has been debated whether the human should be considered the advanced chess player, or rather the team itself should be considered the player. It is the prevailing view that, because the human subordinates the computer in a meaningful intent to win a chess game, and that the human is the one who makes the final decision about the move to be played, the human should be considered the advanced chess player.

== On the Internet ==
In the wake of León, the Internet's ubiquity and a high number of commercial and free Internet chess servers have made it possible for anyone to play advanced chess over the Internet.

The first was CCO (Computer Chess Organization), which organized advanced chess events, most of which took place on Free Internet Chess Server (FICS) or the correspondence website. It was not necessary to be a member of the CCO to participate in its tournaments, although the organization pointed out that membership was highly desirable. Internet chess events usually used unrated games, but CCO did propose the introduction of chess on the Internet of a third category of players: the "advanced-chess player", called (C), with a special advanced-chess rating category, since most chess servers on the Internet already had suitable mechanisms.

At the same time that CCO ended (2005), the PAL/CSS Freestyle Tournament was born, sponsored by the PAL Group on Abu Dhabi and implemented by CSS (Computer-Schach und Spiele) on the Playchess server run by the German company ChessBase. Cash prizes were awarded (totaling 132,000 euros between 2005 and 2008) for the top finishers. Thus, the freestyle chess tournaments were born with the participation not only of the GMs but also of any other player who wanted to register for the tournament. To the surprise of many who were certain that the GMs would prove superior, an amateur player – expert in chess software – won the challenge.

Advanced chess then evolved into freestyle chess with rules very different from those of León, and a new category of chess players was created: the "freestyle chess player", called the centaur (a mythological term chosen to imply joint work by human and computer). In this new type of chess, the integration between man and machine has become fundamental and constant. The freestyle chess sets for centaurs have recently been defined as the "Formula 1" of chess.

Some rules of the game have since changed. Advanced freestyle chess meetings no longer take place in dedicated rooms, but rather at home, live in front of an internet-connected computer via a web server like Playchess or Infinity Chess, and chess players at every level and from all over the world can participate. Meetings usually begin with the elimination stages, with couplings according to the Swiss system, and the top finishers advance to the next and final stages. The centaur finalists, who generally use a pseudonym (nickname), usually challenge each other in a round-robin tournament for the title.

== Online tournaments ==
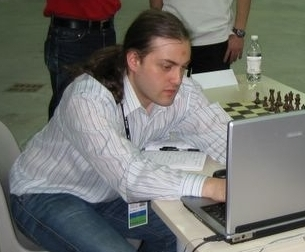
Eros Riccio

There were, therefore, a number of advanced chess tournaments online, called centaur freestyle chess tournaments.

The most important were the aforementioned PAL/CSS Freestyle Tournament, which had a very high level of play, and the winners, in chronological order, were: Zacks (Steven Cramton and Stephen Zackery, USA), Zorchamp (Hydra, UAE), Rajlich (Vasik Rajlich, Hungary), Xakru (Jiri Dufek, Czechia), Flying Saucers (Dagh Nielsen, Denmark), Rajlich (Vasik Rajlich, Hungary), Ibermax (Anson Williams, England), and Ultima (Eros Riccio, Italy).

Similar tournaments have been organized by FICGS, ChessBase, ICC, and especially Infinity Chess.

FICGS organized the Chess Freestyle Cup, which was won by Eros Riccio (1st and 3rd editions), David Evans (2nd edition), and Alvin Alcala (4th and 5th editions).

ChessBase organized the Computer Bild Spiele Schach Turnier for the 2008 Dresden Chess Olympics, which the Italian Eros Riccio won.

The Internet Chess Club also held its own freestyle tour dubbed as 1st Ultimate Chess Championship 2015, won by Alvin Alcala.

Infinity Chess, the server directed by the CCGM Arno Nickel, has organized multiple tournaments. The most important were the following: Welcome Freestyle Tournament, Christmas Freestyle Tournament, IC Freestyle Masters, Infinity Freestyle Tournament, Infinity Chess Freestyle Battle 2014, 8-legs of Centaur Weekend Tours, IC Team Cup, and Ultimate Challenge. A computer engine (Zor) ended first in the freestyle Ultimate Challenge tournament (2017), while the first centaur (Thomas A. Anderson, Germany) ranked in 3rd place. The total prize money for the 2017 tournament was $20,000.

Infinity chess has developed two special Elo rankings for the centaurs. The first, based on results achieved in advanced chess tournaments from 2005 to 2013, lists Sephiroth (Eros Riccio) in first place with 2755 points. The second, based on tournaments played from 2010 to 2014, lists Intagrand (David Evans, Anson Williams, Yingheng Chen, and Nelson Hernandez) in first place with 2689 points.

== In future studies ==
Centaur chess is sometimes invoked to argue that humans will continue to remain relevant as AI progresses. U.S. Deputy Defense Secretary Robert O. Work invoked in 2016 the concept of "centaur warfighting", extending the centaur concept beyond the chess world. Tyler Cowen and others assessed in 2013 that, due to chess engine advances, it was getting difficult to see any major advantage to centaurs over computers by themselves in chess, and that it seemed unlikely that centaurs would retain a significant advantage for much longer. In contrast, as recently as 2017, Kasparov stated that, given an appropriate operator, he is confident that a centaur team could outperform the top supercomputers, while James Bridle stated in 2018 that "an average player paired with an average computer is capable of beating the most sophisticated supercomputer". A recent study has shown that AI in centaur chess substitutes traditional human skills and enables new complementary capabilities, providing suggestive evidence of how AI reshapes competitive dynamics in organizations.

== See also ==
- Computer chess
- Chess engine
- Cheating in chess#Technology
