= Viswanathan Anand =

Indian chess grandmaster (born 1969)

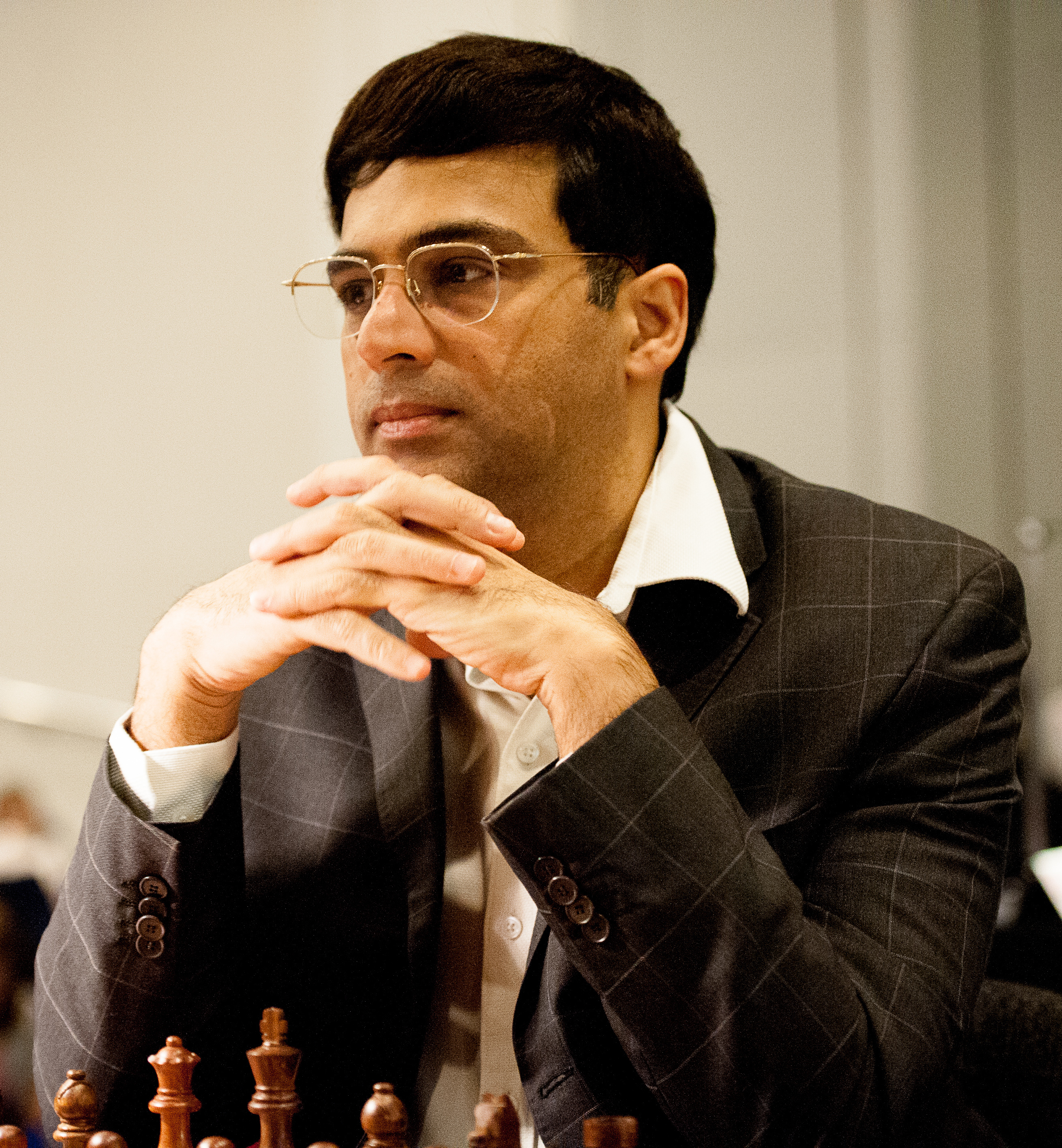
- Anand in 2016

Acting President of FIDE
- In office 23 July 2026 – 26 September 2026
- Deputy: Himself
- Preceded by: Arkady Dvorkovich
- Succeeded by: Timur Turlov

Deputy President of FIDE
- Incumbent
- Assumed office 7 August 2022
- President: Arkady Dvorkovich; Himself (acting); Timur Turlov

Personal details
- Born: Anand Viswanathan; 11 December 1969 (age 56) Mayiladuthurai, Tamil Nadu, India
- Spouse: Aruna Anand (m. 1996)
- Children: 1
- Education: Loyola College, Chennai
- Chess career
- Country: India
- Title: Grandmaster (1988)
- World Champion: 2000–2002 (FIDE); 2007–2013 (undisputed)
- FIDE rating: 2739 (November 2026)
- Peak rating: 2817 (March 2011)
- Ranking: No. 14 (November 2026)
- Peak ranking: No. 1 (April 2007)

Viswanathan "Vishy" Anand (born 11 December 1969) is an Indian chess grandmaster. Anand is a four-time undisputed World Chess Champion, a FIDE World Chess Champion, a two-time World Rapid Chess Champion, and a World Blitz Chess Champion. He became the first grandmaster from India in 1988 and became the fourth player in history to pass the 2800 Elo mark on the FIDE rating list In April 2006. He occupied the number-one position for 21 months, the sixth-longest period on record, and has the eighth-highest peak FIDE rating of all time.

Anand defeated Alexei Shirov in a six-game match to win the 2000 FIDE World Chess Championship, a title he held until 2002. He became the undisputed world champion by winning the 2007 World Championship tournament, and defended his title in matchplay against Vladimir Kramnik in 2008, Veselin Topalov in 2010, and Boris Gelfand in 2012. In 2013, he lost the title to challenger Magnus Carlsen, and he lost a rematch to Carlsen in 2014 after winning the 2014 Candidates Tournament.

Known for his rapid playing speed as a child, Anand earned the sobriquet "Lightning Kid" during his early career in the 1980s. He won the FIDE World Rapid Chess Championship in 2003 and 2017, the Grenkeleasing Rapid World Championship, 11 times, and the Amber chess tournament rapid event 9 times. Thus, Anand is often considered the greatest rapid chess player of all time. He also won the World Blitz Chess Cup in 2000, the Chess World Cup in 2000 and 2002, and numerous other top-level events.

Anand was the first recipient of the Khel Ratna Award in 1991–92, India's highest sporting honour. In 2007, he was awarded India's second-highest civilian award, the Padma Vibhushan, making him the first sportsperson to receive the award. As a chess administrator, he was the elected deputy president of FIDE in August 2022, and briefly served as acting president of FIDE after Arkady Dvorkovich was added on the international sanctions list against Russia in July 2026. After the conclusion of the 2026 FIDE presidential election, Anand remained as deputy president after Timur Turlov was elected as the new president of FIDE. He has played a significant role in popularizing chess in India.

== Early life ==
Viswanathan Anand was born on 11 December 1969 in a Tamil Hindu family in Mayiladuthurai, Tamil Nadu, India. His father, Krishnamurthy Viswanathan, was a general manager in the Southern Railways and he had studied in Jamalpur, Bihar. He later moved to Chennai, where he grew up.

His mother, Sushila, was a housewife, a chess enthusiast, and an influential socialite.

Anand is the youngest of three children. He is 11 years younger than his sister and 13 years younger than his brother. His brother, Shivakumar, is a manager at Crompton Greaves in India, and his sister, Anuradha, is a professor at the University of Michigan.

Anand learned to play chess at the age of six from his mother. He further developed his skills in Manila, where he lived with his parents from 1978 to the early 1980s while his father worked as a consultant for the Philippine National Railways.

He was educated at Don Bosco Matriculation Higher Secondary School, Chennai and holds a Bachelor of Commerce degree from Loyola College, Chennai.

== Early chess career ==
Anand's rise in the Indian chess world was meteoric. National success came early for him when he won the sub-junior championship with a score of 9/9 points in 1983, at age 14. In 1984 Anand won the Asian Junior Championship in Coimbatore, earning an International Master (IM) norm in the process. Soon afterward, he participated in the 26th Chess Olympiad, in Thessaloniki, where he made his debut on the Indian national team. There, Anand scored 7½ points in 11 games, gaining his second IM norm. In 1985 he became the youngest Indian to achieve the title of International Master, at age 15, by winning the Asian Junior Championship for the second year in a row, this time in Hong Kong. At age 16, he became the national chess champion. He won that title two more times. He played games at blitz speed. In 1987, he became the first Indian to win the World Junior Chess Championship. In 1987, at age 18, he became India's first grandmaster by winning the Shakti Finance International chess tournament held in Coimbatore, India. One of his notable successes in this tournament was his win against Russian grandmaster Efim Geller. He was awarded Padma Shri at age 18.

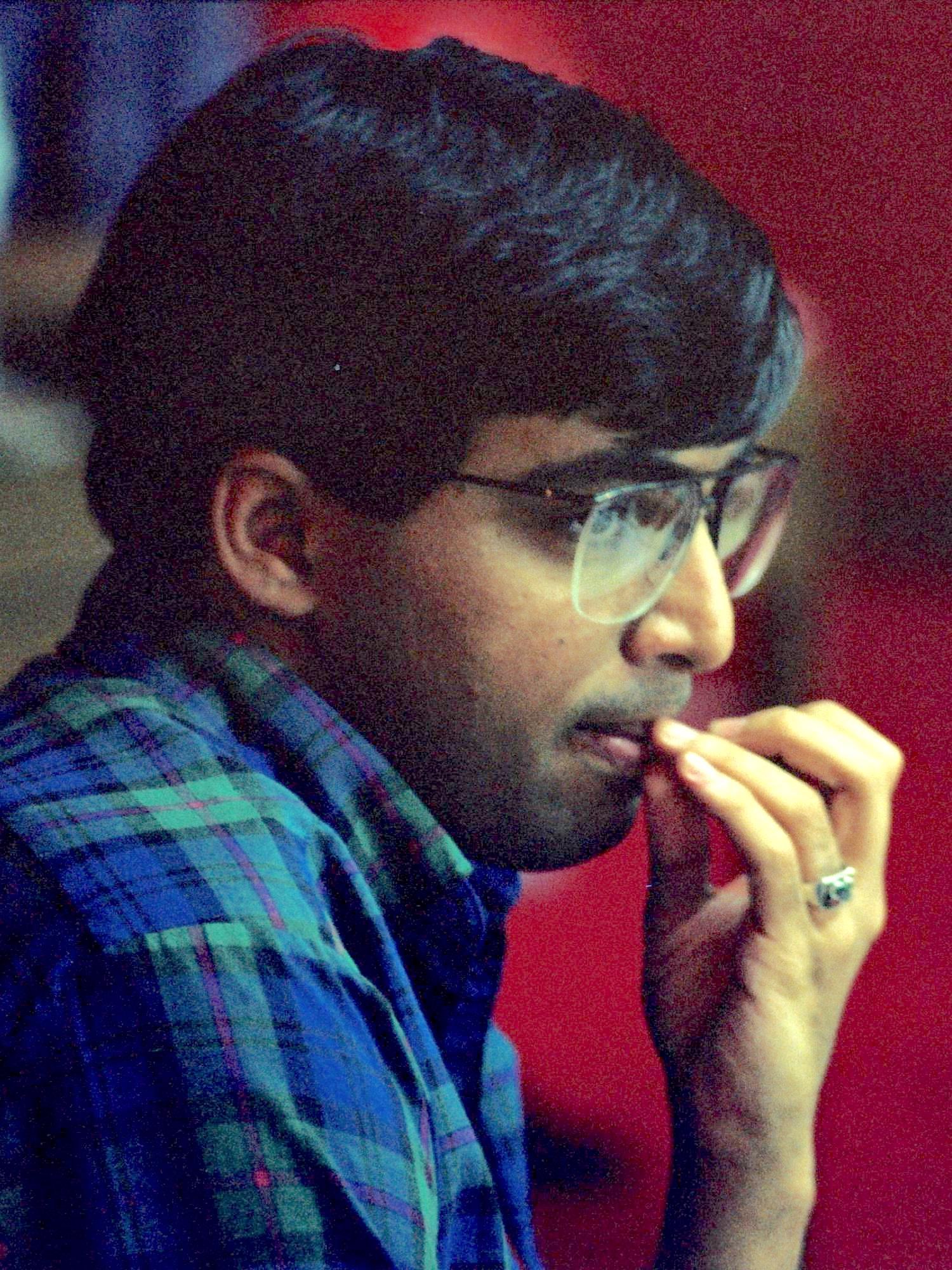
Anand at the Manila 1992 Olympiad, aged 22

In the 1993 World Chess Championship cycle, Anand qualified for his first Candidates Tournament, winning his first match but narrowly losing his quarterfinal match to 1990 runner-up Anatoly Karpov.

In 1994–95, Anand and Gata Kamsky dominated the qualifying cycles for the rival FIDE and PCA world championships. In the FIDE cycle, Anand lost his 2nd round (Candidates semifinal) match to Kamsky after leading early. Kamsky lost the 1996 FIDE championship match to Karpov.

In the 1995 PCA cycle, Anand won matches against Oleg Romanishin and Michael Adams without a loss, then avenged his FIDE loss by defeating Kamsky in the Candidates final. In 1995, he played the PCA World Chess Championship against Kasparov at New York City's World Trade Center. After an opening run of eight draws (a record for the opening of a world championship match until 21 November 2018), Anand won game nine with a powerful exchange sacrifice, but then lost four of the next five. He lost the match 10½–7½.

In the 1998 FIDE cycle, FIDE granted Karpov, the reigning champion, direct seeding into the final against the winner of the seven-round single-elimination Candidates tournament. The psychological and physical advantage Karpov gained from this decision caused significant controversy, leading to Kramnik's withdrawal from the tournament. Anand won the tournament, defeating Adams in the final, and immediately faced Karpov for the championship. Despite this disadvantage for Anand, which he described as being "brought in a coffin" to play Karpov, the regular match ended 3–3, which led to a rapid playoff, which Karpov won 2–0. Karpov thus remained the FIDE champion.

=== Other results ===
Anand has won the Mainz Chess Classic, a Category 21 Championship, a record 11 times. In 2008, he defeated Carlsen en route to his 11th title in that event.

Anand is the first player to have won five titles of the Corus chess tournament. He is the first player to have won each of the Big Three supertournaments at the time: Corus (1989, 1998, 2003, 2004, 2006), Linares (1998, 2007, 2008), and Dortmund (1996, 2000, 2004).

Anand has a stellar record at the annual Melody Amber Tournament (2 separate and unique Blindfold and Rapid Chess supertournaments played): he has 5 overall prizes (winning in 1994, 1997, 2003, 2005, and 2006), and has the most "rapidplay" titles, winning 9 times. He is also the only player to win the blind and rapid sections of the tournament in the same year (twice, in 1997 and 2005).

Anand won three consecutive Advanced Chess tournaments in Leon, Spain, after Kasparov introduced this form of chess in 1998, and is widely recognised as the world's best Advanced Chess player, where players may consult a computer to aid in their calculation of variations.

Anand's collection My Best Games of Chess was published in 1998 and updated in 2001. His individual tournament successes include the Corus chess tournament in 2006 (tied with Topalov), Dortmund in 2004, and Linares in 2007 and 2008. In 2007 he won the Grenkeleasing Rapid championship for the tenth time, defeating Levon Aronian. Just a few days before, Aronian had defeated Anand in the Chess960 final.

In March 2007, Anand won the Linares chess tournament and it was widely believed that he would be ranked world No. 1 in the FIDE Elo rating list for April 2007. But Anand was No. 2 on the initial list released because the Linares result was not included. FIDE subsequently announced that Linares would be included, pushing Anand to number one in the April 2007 list.

== World Chess Championships ==
=== 1995 ===
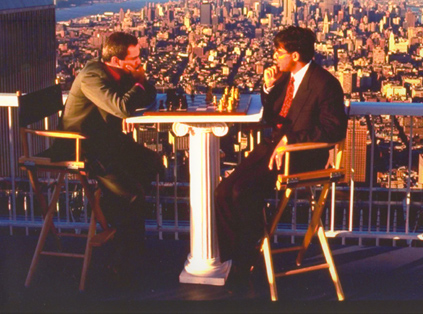
In 1995, Anand faced Garry Kasparov for the world championship in a match held at the World Trade Center.

In 1993, the newly formed Professional Chess Association (PCA) held a 54-player, 11-round Swiss-style qualifying tournament in Groningen on 19–30 December, an equivalent of FIDE's Interzonal. Anand scored 7½/11 to finish tied for first and secure a berth in the 1994 Candidates' Tournament. In the single-elimination tournament, Anand handily dispatched Adams and Oleg Romanishin in the quarterfinal and semifinal matches, held in New York City and Linares. Facing Kamsky in a 12-game final match held at Las Palmas, Anand lost Game 1 on time in a winning position but recovered with wins in Game 3, 9, and 11 to secure a 6½–4½ victory and a match against reigning champion Kasparov for the world chess championship. It was the first Candidates' Tournament victory of Anand's career.

The 20-game championship match was held from 10 September to 16 October 1995 on the 107th floor of the World Trade Center in New York City. The match started with a then-record eight consecutive draws before Anand broke open the match in Game 9, pressing and eventually breaking through Kasparov's Sicilian Defense with a powerful exchange sacrifice. But Anand scored just half a point in the next five games, losing twice to Kasparov's Sicilian Dragon defence, and eventually conceded a 10½–7½ loss. Afterwards, Kasparov commented on Anand's psychological approach to the match:

Anand lost the match in five games, Games 10 to 14. I lost many games in a row to Karpov in the first match I played with him, but I don't think he was that much better. It was a great experience for me. Anand wasn't paying enough attention with his team to the fact that he was playing the World Championship. He has never played such a strong opponent for such a long event. You can't compare his match with Kamsky in April to the match we have played here... I'm criticizing the strategy. He could have played without a fixed strategy and adjusted during the match. The chess preparation was excellent, but there was some psychological advice not appropriate

World Chess Championship Match 1995
	Rating	1	2	3	4	5	6	7	8	9	10	11	12	13	14	15	16	17	18	Total
Garry Kasparov (Russia)	2795	½	½	½	½	½	½	½	½	0	1	1	½	1	1	½	½	½	½	10½
Viswanathan Anand (India)	2725	½	½	½	½	½	½	½	½	1	0	0	½	0	0	½	½	½	½	7½

=== 1998 ===
In a radical departure from previous years, the 1998 world championship was a 100-player knockout tournament, with each round consisting of two-game matches and ties resolved by rapid and blitz games. Controversially, Karpov, the defending champion, was seeded directly into the final, held just three days after the conclusion of the three-week tournament. This format gave Karpov a significant advantage in rest time and preparation; Kasparov and Kramnik both declined to participate as a result. The latter explained his absence bluntly: "Is it fair to expect Sampras to only play one match and defend his Wimbledon title?"

As a result of Kasparov's withdrawal, Anand entered the tournament in Groningen, Netherlands as the #1 seed. After dispatching future FIDE champion Alexander Khalifman in the third round, he scored quick victories over Zoltán Almási, Alexei Shirov, and Boris Gelfand to advance. In the final against ninth-seeded Michael Adams, held on 30 December, both players drew their first four games. A visibly tired Anand, having played 21 games in 23 days, eventually prevailed in a sudden-death blitz game to secure a 3–2 victory.

Immediately after defeating Adams, Anand arranged a flight with his team to the International Olympic Committee museum in Lausanne, Switzerland to play Karpov in a six-game match for the FIDE world title. With just four hours of pre-match preparation, Anand lost Game 1 after Karpov surprised him with a bold queen sacrifice on the 31st move. But he won Game 2 in 42 moves from a disadvantaged position after accepting a sharp exchange sacrifice and outplaying Karpov in the resulting endgame. After losing Game 4, Anand entered the final game of the match needing a win to force the match into a playoff. Playing white, he opened with the Trompowsky Attack. Karpov defended well until 28...Qd8?, a critical mistake that lost him a piece and the game.

In the first rapid playoff game, Anand secured a significant advantage on the board before a calculation mistake (40...a4?) cost him the game. Karpov then won the second game with black to seal a 5−3 victory and retain the FIDE title. After the match, Anand reiterated his concerns with the unfairness of the tournament format.

It was almost as if I had been asked to run a 100-metre sprint after completing a cross-country marathon... Karpov waited for the corpse of his challenger to be delivered in a coffin. If anybody else other than Karpov wins, it's a world championship. Otherwise, it's not.

Karpov, meanwhile, questioned Anand's temperament and remarked that he "doesn't have the character" to win big games. For his part, Kasparov dismissed the match as between "a tired player and an old player".

World Chess Championship Match 1998
	Rating	1	2	3	4	5	6	R1	R2	Points
Anatoly Karpov (Russia)	2745	1	0	½	1	½	0	1	1	5
Viswanathan Anand (India)	2765	0	1	½	0	½	1	0	0	3

=== 2000 ===
From 25 November to 27 December 2000, the FIDE World Chess Championship was a 100-player single-elimination tournament in New Delhi, India and Tehran, Iran. After winning the 2000 FIDE World Cup, Anand entered the event as the #1 overall seed and one of the favourites to win alongside Topalov, Gelfand, and Shirov. Anand decided to join the event after skipping the 1999 edition, due to ongoing negotiations for a title match with Kasparov that ultimately fell through. Kasparov and Kramnik, who defeated Kasparov in a match for the lineal world title earlier in the year, did not participate in the event. Anand's second and preparation partner for the tournament was Spanish grandmaster Elizbar Ubilava.

Enjoying boisterous home-crowd support, Anand moved through the early rounds with relatively little difficulty, notching quick wins against Viktor Bologan, Smbat Lputian, and Bartłomiej Macieja. In the quarterfinals, he had four consecutive draws against defending champion Alexander Khalifman before winning a 15-minute tiebreak game to progress. Against Adams in the semifinals, Anand quickly drew Game 1 and took advantage of a positional blunder by Adams (20...c5?) to win Game 2 in 36 moves with white. Quick draws in games 3 and 4 then saw Anand through to the final match.

Anand vs. Shirov, 2000 World Ch.

Position: g8 black king, b7 black pawn, h7 black pawn, d5 black pawn, e5 white bishop, b4 white pawn, g4 black pawn, h4 white knight, a3 white pawn, d3 white king, e3 black pawn, d2 black pawn, g2 black rook, a1 white rook, c1 black rook, h1 white rook

Final position of the match.

The final match, played from 20 to 26 December 2000 in Tehran, pitted Anand against fourth-seeded Shirov, who was denied a chance to play Kasparov for the world title two years earlier. After a draw in Game 1, Anand entered a sharp line in the Ruy Lopez in Game 2, ultimately converting a passed pawn into a winning endgame after placing Shirov in zugzwang on move 41. Anand then seized control of the match with a 41-move win in Game 3 after neutralizing a rook sacrifice by Shirov on move 19, and sealed victory in the match with another win in Game 4.

Anand's run to his first world championship saw him go unbeaten through the entire tournament, with eight wins and 12 draws. With the win, he became the first world champion from east Asia and the first world champion from outside the ex-Soviet Union since Bobby Fischer. In addition to the title of FIDE world champion, Anand received a $528,000 cash prize. Upon returning to India, Anand was awarded the Padma Bhushan by the Indian government in recognition of his victory. Later, he gave his thoughts on his matches against Khalifman and Shirov:

The tiebreaker against Khalifman was more thrilling, because this was in the knockout stage. There was a stage when I felt that I was on the verge of being eliminated. We played a series of games one after another. It was touch and go. I could not prepare myself before every game in Delhi because I did not know who was going to be my opponent the next day. So I would prepare for a general game. But I knew that in the final I was playing against Shirov. I knew that he had not been playing well. If he had won six games, he had lost eight. So I knew if I could put him under pressure he would make mistakes. And that is what I did.

World Chess Championship Match 2000
	Rating	1	2	3	4	Points
Alexei Shirov (Spain)	2746	½	0	0	0	½
Viswanathan Anand (India)	2762	½	1	1	1	3½

=== 2005 ===
In 2005, Anand finished in a tie for second place at the 2005 FIDE World Chess Championship, won by Topalov.

FIDE World Chess Championship 2005
		Age	Rating^{1}	Performance	Rank	TOP	ANA	SVI	MOR	LEK	KAS	ADA	POL	Total
1	Veselin Topalov (Bulgaria)	30	2788	(+102)	3	-	½ ½	1 ½	1 ½	1 ½	1 ½	1 ½	1 ½	10
2	Viswanathan Anand (India)	35	2788	(+19)	2	½ ½	-	½ ½	0 ½	½ 1	0 1	1 ½	1 1	8½
3	Peter Svidler (Russia)	29	2738	(+76)	7	0 ½	½ ½	-	1 1	1 ½	½ ½	½ ½	1 ½	8½
4	Alexander Morozevich (Russia)	28	2707	(+36)	14	0 ½	1 ½	0 0	-	½ 1	½ 1	½ ½	½ ½	7
5	Peter Leko (Hungary)	26	2763	(-52)	4	0 ½	½ 0	0 ½	½ 0	-	½ 1	1 ½	1 ½	6½
6	Rustam Kasimdzhanov (Uzbekistan)	25	2670	(+2)	35	0 ½	1 0	½ ½	½ 0	½ 0	-	½ ½	0 1	5½
7	Michael Adams (England)	33	2719	(-53)	13	0 ½	0 ½	½ ½	½ ½	0 ½	½ ½	-	½ ½	5½
8	Judit Polgár (Hungary)	29	2735	(-125)	8	0 ½	0 0	0 ½	½ ½	0 ½	1 0	½ ½	-	4½

=== 2007 ===
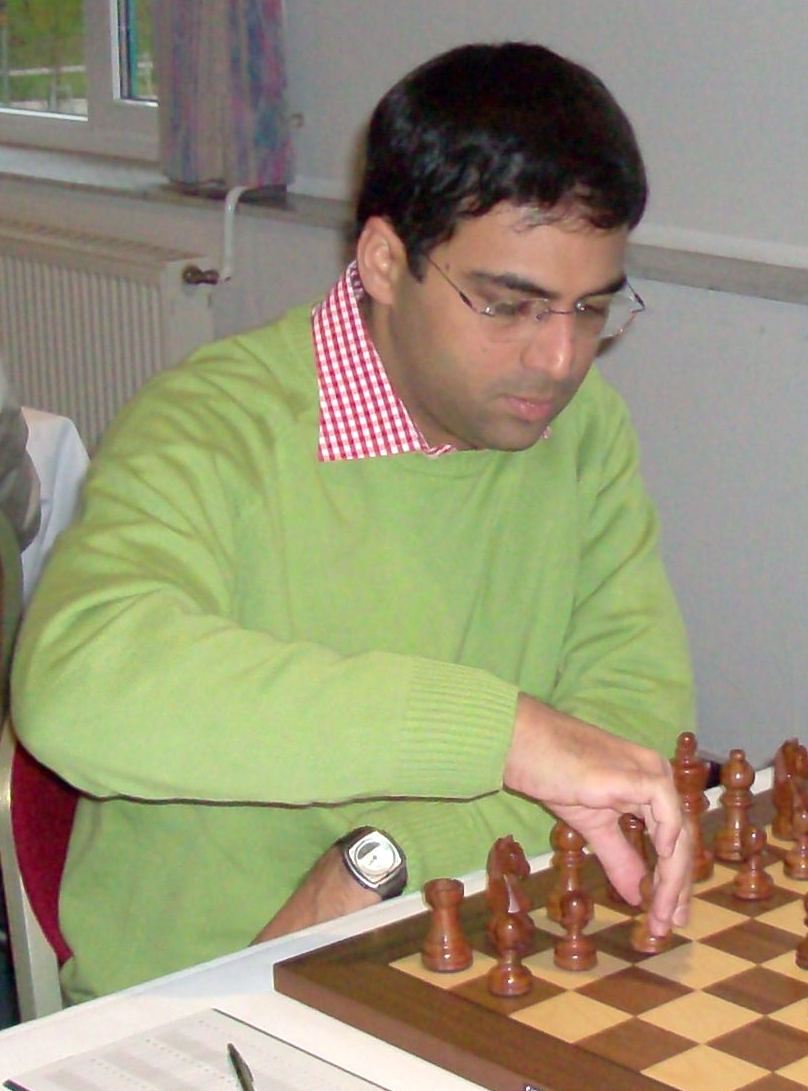
Anand in 2007

The finish of the 2005 World Chess Championship qualified Anand for the 2007 championship, an eight-player double round-robin tournament held in Mexico City from 12 to 30 September 2007. In 2006, Kramnik took Topalov's place in the event after his victory over the latter to reunify the world title. Anand entered the tournament as the world's top-ranked player, and was considered a favourite to win alongside the defending champion Kramnik.

After a Round 1 draw, Anand drew first blood in the tournament, handily defeating Aronian with black in Round 2. After the fourth round, Anand and Kramnik were tied for the lead with 2½ each. But in the next three rounds, Anand separated himself from the pack with wins over Peter Svidler and Alexander Grischuk, taking the lead. He then held Kramnik to a draw in Round 10, and extended his lead to 1½ points with a 56-move win over Alexander Morozevich. In Round 13, Anand played precise defence and salvaged a lost rook endgame against Grischuk with black to retain his lead, and sealed the championship in the final round with a 20-move draw against Peter Leko. Anand's performance in Mexico City saw him pick up four wins and 10 draws, and he finished as the only undefeated player in the tournament with a 2848 performance rating. This was his second world chess championship, and first since the reunification of the title in 2006. As a result, he gained nine rating points to break the 2800 Elo rating barrier for the second time in his career in October 2007. In the post-event press conference, Anand commented on his final game and his feelings on winning the tournament:

This time there is no rival claimant, so obviously it is a fantastic feeling. You can imagine how I feel. This is something very special for me. I feel that here I played the best. You have to perform at the right moment-it's important that I peaked here. This tournament went like a dream... Yesterday I had to work really hard but today I just remembered Tal's saying that when your hand plays one way and your heart plays another, it never goes well. So I decided to be very solid and just go for the draw.

With the win, Anand became the first undisputed world champion to win the title in a tournament, rather than in match play, since Mikhail Botvinnik in 1948. In addition to the world title, Anand received a $390,000 cash prize.

Rank	Player	Rating	1		2		3		4		5		6		7		8		Points	H2H	Wins	NS
1	Viswanathan Anand (IND)	2792			½	½	½	½	½	½	1	½	1	½	½	1	1	½	9			
2	Vladimir Kramnik (RUS)	2769	½	½			½	½	1	½	½	½	1	0	1	½	½	½	8	1	3	54.50
3	Boris Gelfand (ISR)	2733	½	½	½	½			½	½	½	½	1	½	1	1	½	0	8	1	3	54.25
4	Peter Leko (HUN)	2751	½	½	½	0	½	½			½	½	1	½	½	0	1	½	7			
5	Peter Svidler (RUS)	2735	½	0	½	½	½	½	½	½			½	0	½	½	1	½	6½			
6	Alexander Morozevich (RUS)	2758	½	0	1	0	½	0	½	0	1	½			½	½	1	0	6	1	3	
7	Levon Aronian (ARM)	2750	0	½	½	0	0	0	1	½	½	½	½	½			1	½	6	1	2	
8	Alexander Grischuk (RUS)	2726	½	0	½	½	1	½	½	0	½	0	1	0	½	0			5½			

Key: H2H = head-to-head, points against tied player; NS = Neustadtl score

=== 2008 ===
Anand convincingly defended the title against Kramnik in the 2008 World Chess Championship held on 14–29 October in Bonn, Germany. The winner was to be the first to score 6½ points in the 12-game match. Anand won by scoring 6½ points in 11 games, winning three of the first six games (two with black). After the tenth game, Anand led 6–4 and needed only a draw in either of the last two games to win the match. In Game 11, Kramnik played the Najdorf Variation of the Sicilian Defense. Once the players traded queens, Kramnik offered a draw after 24 moves since he had no winning chances in the endgame.

Anand vs. Kramnik, 2008 World Ch.

Position: c8 black rook, f8 black king, g8 black rook, b7 black pawn, e7 black knight, f7 black pawn, h7 black pawn, a6 black pawn, f5 black pawn, e3 black bishop, a2 white pawn, b2 white pawn, c2 white pawn, f2 white rook, g2 white pawn, h2 white pawn, b1 white king, c1 white knight, f1 white bishop, h1 white rook

Final position of the match

Anand (2783) vs. Kramnik (2772), Wch Bonn GER (11); 29 October 2008 (final game)
1.e4 c5 2.Nf3 d6 3.d4 cxd4 4.Nxd4 Nf6 5.Nc3 a6 6.Bg5 e6 7.f4 Qc7 8.Bxf6 gxf6 9.f5 Qc5 10.Qd3 Nc6 11.Nb3 Qe5 12.0-0-0 exf5 13.Qe3 Bg7 14.Rd5 Qe7 15.Qg3 Rg8 16.Qf4 fxe4 17.Nxe4 f5 18.Nxd6+ Kf8 19.Nxc8 Rxc8 20.Kb1 Qe1+ 21.Nc1 Ne7 22.Qd2 Qxd2 23.Rxd2 Bh6 24.Rf2 Be3 (diagram) ½–½

Of Anand's win, Kasparov said, "A great result for Anand and for chess. Vishy deserved the win in every way and I'm very happy for him. It will not be easy for the younger generation to push him aside... Anand out-prepared Kramnik completely. In this way, it reminded me of my match with Kramnik in London 2000. Like I was then, Kramnik may have been very well prepared for this match, but we never saw it." In 2010 Anand donated his gold medal to the charitable organisation The Foundation to be auctioned off for the benefit of underprivileged children.

World Chess Championship Match 2008
	Rating	1	2	3	4	5	6	7	8	9	10	11	Total
Viswanathan Anand (India)	2783	½	½	1	½	1	1	½	½	½	0	½	6½
Vladimir Kramnik (Russia)	2772	½	½	0	½	0	0	½	½	½	1	½	4½

=== 2010 ===
Before the 2010 World Chess Championship match with Topalov, Anand, who had been booked on the flight Frankfurt–Sofia on 16 April, was stranded due to the cancellation of all flights following the volcano ash cloud from Eyjafjallajökull. He asked for a three-day postponement, which the Bulgarian organisers refused on 19 April. Anand reached Sofia on 20 April after a 40-hour road journey. Consequently, the first game was delayed by one day.

The match consisted of 12 games. In Game 1, Topalov defeated Anand in 30 moves with a very sharp attack that broke through Anand's Grunfeld Defence. It was revealed afterwards that Topalov had found the line during his opening preparation with the help of a powerful supercomputer loaned to him by Bulgaria's Defense Department. Anand quickly responded with a win in Game 2, employing a novelty out of the Catalan Opening that was not easily recognized by computers at the time (15. Qa3!?, followed by 16. bxa3!). Anand won with the Catalan again in Game 4, only to drop Game 8 and leave the score level once again. After 11 games the score was tied at 5½–5½. Anand won game 12 on the Black side of a Queen's Gambit Declined to win the game and the match. Topalov chose to accept a pawn sacrifice by Anand, hoping to force a result and avoid a rapid chess tiebreak round. But after Topalov's dubious 31st and 32nd moves, Anand used the sacrifice to obtain a strong attack against Topalov's relatively exposed king. Topalov subsequently resigned, allowing Anand to retain the world championship.

World Chess Championship Match 2010
	Rating	1	2	3	4	5	6	7	8	9	10	11	12	Total
Viswanathan Anand (India)	2787	0	1	½	1	½	½	½	0	½	½	½	1	6½
Veselin Topalov (Bulgaria)	2805	1	0	½	0	½	½	½	1	½	½	½	0	5½

=== 2012 ===
As a result of Anand's victory in 2010, he defended his title in the 2012 World Chess Championship at the Tretyakov Gallery in Moscow. His opponent was Boris Gelfand, the winner of the 2011 Candidates Matches. After losing Game 7 to Gelfand, Anand came back to win Game 8 in only 17 moves, the shortest decisive game in World Chess Championship history. The match was tied 6–6 after regular games with one win each. Anand won the rapid tiebreak 2½–1½ to win the match and retain his title. After the match, Russian president Vladimir Putin greeted Anand and Gelfand by calling both to his official residence.

World Chess Championship Match 2012
	Rating	1	2	3	4	5	6	7	8	9	10	11	12	Points	13	14	15	16	Total
Viswanathan Anand (India)	2791	½	½	½	½	½	½	0	1	½	½	½	½	6	½	1	½	½	8½
Boris Gelfand (Israel)	2727	½	½	½	½	½	½	1	0	½	½	½	½	6	½	0	½	½	7½

=== 2013 ===
Anand lost his title in the 2013 World Chess Championship in Chennai. The winner was Magnus Carlsen, the winner of the 2013 Candidates Tournament. The first four games were drawn, but Carlsen won Games 5 and 6. Games 7 and 8 were drawn, and Carlsen won Game 9. On 22 November, Game 10 was drawn, making Carlsen the new world champion.

World Chess Championship 2013
	Rating	Game 1 9 Nov.	Game 2 10 Nov.	Game 3 12 Nov.	Game 4 13 Nov.	Game 5 15 Nov.	Game 6 16 Nov.	Game 7 18 Nov.	Game 8 19 Nov.	Game 9 21 Nov.	Game 10 22 Nov.	Game 11 24 Nov.	Game 12 26 Nov.	Points
Viswanathan Anand (India)	2775	½	½	½	½	0	0	½	½	0	½	Not required		3½
Magnus Carlsen (Norway)	2870	½	½	½	½	1	1	½	½	1	½	Not required		6½

=== 2014 ===
Anand won the double round-robin FIDE Candidates tournament at Khanty-Mansiysk (13–30 March) and earned a rematch with Carlsen. He went through the tournament undefeated, winning his first-round game against Aronian, his third-round game against Shakhriyar Mamedyarov, and his ninth-round game against Topalov. He drew all his other games, including his 12th-round game against Dmitry Andreikin, where Anand agreed to a draw in a complex but winning position. He faced Carlsen in the world championship match in Sochi, Russia, in November. Carlsen won the match 6½ to 4½ after 11 of 12 scheduled games.

World Chess Championship 2014
	Rating	Game 1 8 Nov.	Game 2 9 Nov.	Game 3 11 Nov.	Game 4 12 Nov.	Game 5 14 Nov.	Game 6 15 Nov.	Game 7 17 Nov.	Game 8 18 Nov.	Game 9 20 Nov.	Game 10 21 Nov.	Game 11 23 Nov.	Game 12 25 Nov.	Points
Magnus Carlsen (Norway)	2863	½	1	0	½	½	1	½	½	½	½	1	Not required	6½
Viswanathan Anand (India)	2792	½	0	1	½	½	0	½	½	½	½	0	Not required	4½

=== FIDE World Rapid Chess Champion 2003 ===
In October 2003, the governing body of chess, FIDE, organised a rapid time control tournament in Cap d'Agde and billed it as the World Rapid Chess Championship. Each player had 25 minutes at the start of the game, with an additional ten seconds after each move. Anand won this event ahead of ten of the top 12 players in the world, beating Kramnik in the final. His main recent titles in this category are at Corsica (six years in a row from 1999 through 2005), Chess Classic (nine years in a row from 2000 through 2008), Leon 2005, Eurotel 2002, Fujitsu Giants 2002 and the Melody Amber (five times, and he won the rapid portion of Melody Amber seven times). In the Melody Amber 2007, Anand did not lose a single game in the rapid section, and scored 8½/11, two more than the runners-up, for a performance rating in the rapid section of 2939. In most tournament time control games that Anand plays, he has more time left than his opponent at the end of the game. He lost on time in one game, to Kamsky. Otherwise, he took advantage of the rule allowing players in time trouble to use dashes instead of move notation during the last four minutes only once, against Peter Svidler at the MTel Masters 2006.

=== FIDE World Rapid Chess Champion 2017 ===
Anand won the 2017 World Rapid Chess Championship, defeating Vladimir Fedoseev 2–0 in the final tiebreak after he, Fedoseev and Ian Nepomniachtchi tied for first with 10½/15 points. His first victory in a world championship since losing the classical championship to Carlsen in 2013.

== Post-2010 chess career ==
=== 2010 ===
- 2010 Sofia World Chess Championship: From 24 April – 11 May 2010, Anand participated in a World Championship match against Topalov. Topalov gained direct entry into a challengers match against Kamsky as compensation from FIDE for not gaining entry into the 2007 World Chess Championship cycle. Because Topalov defeated Kamsky, he earned the right to challenge Anand for the World Chess Championship title. The match was level after 11 games, with 2 wins apiece in Rounds 1, 2, 4, and 8. In Game 12, Anand defeated Topalov with Black and retained his title.

=== 2011 ===
- 73rd Tata Steel Chess Tournament: From 14 to 30 January 2011, Anand participated in the 73rd Tata Steel Chess Tournament in Wijk Aan Zee, the Netherlands. He finished 2nd overall in the tournament, scoring 8½ points out of 13 (+4−0=9), just behind the winner, Hikaru Nakamura. Anand defeated Shirov, Ruslan Ponomariov, Wang Hao, and Jan Smeets.
- 20th Amber Tournament 2011: From 11 to 25 March 2011, Anand participated in the 20th and final Amber Chess tournament, held in the city of Monte Carlo in Monaco. The tournament was broken into a Blindfold tournament and a Rapid Tournament. Anand scored 7 points out of a possible 11 in the Blindfold tournament (4 wins and 0 losses). In the Rapid tournament, he scored 6 points out of 11 (+4−3=4).
- Anand-Kasimdzhanov Match: On 27 March 2011, Anand played a friendly 4-game rapid match with one of his seconds, Rustam Kasimdzhanov, in Tashkent, Uzbekistan. Anand won the match 3½−½ (the first game was drawn).
- Anand-Shirov Match: From 2–6 June 2011, Anand played in the 24th León Masters Tournament (XXIV Magistral de Ajedrez Ciudad de Leon Match). It was a rapid match between Anand and Shirov, consisting of two games a day between 3 and 5 June with a time control of 60 minutes + 30 seconds per move. Anand defeated Shirov 4½−1½ to win the match (+3−0=3).
- Tal Memorial 2011: The 6th Tal Memorial tournament took place from 16 to 25 June 2011. The tournament was a 10-player, 9-round single round-robin in Moscow. Anand scored 50%, with 9 draws out of 9. Carlsen was eventually declared the winner of the tournament on a tiebreak, having finished equal in points to Aronian.
- 2011 Bilbao Masters — Grand Slam: From 25 September – 11 October 2011, Anand participated in the 4th Bilbao Masters tournament. The tournament was a 6-player double-round-robin, played using a soccer-like scoring system (3 points for a win, 1 for a draw, 0 for a loss). The other five participants included Carlsen, Nakamura, Aronian, Vasyl Ivanchuk, and Francisco Vallejo Pons. Anand finished tied 3rd to 5th (same number of points as Nakamura and Aronian), winning 2 games and losing 2 games and earning 12 points out of a maximum 30.
- Corsican Masters Knockout: From 22 to 31 October 2011, Anand won the Corsican Masters Knockout Tournament, held in Ajaccio, Corsica. The tournament started with an open tournament, where the top 14 players after 9 rounds joined Anand and Shakriyar Mamedyarov in a 16-player knockout tournament. Anand and Mamedyarov made it to the final round and Anand won, 2–0.

=== 2012 ===
In 2012, Anand participated in several high-level tournaments, including the London Chess Classic and the Bilbao Masters Grand Slam. Earlier in 2012, he also played a World Championship match against Gelfand in Moscow.

- 2012 Moscow World Chess Championship: From 10 to 30 May 2012, Anand participated in a World Championship match against Gelfand. Earlier in 2011, Gelfand had won the 2012 World Chess Championship Candidates Tournament in Kazan, Russia. The championship was a scheduled 12-game match, played in the Tretyakov Gallery in Moscow. The 12-game match was level after 12 games, with 1 win apiece in Rounds 7 and 8. Anand had won one of the shortest decisive chess games in World Chess Championship, in 17 moves. Anand retained his title after defeating Gelfand in the following 4-game rapid match.
- 2012 Bilbao Masters — Grand Slam: During 24 September – 13 October 2012, Anand participated in the 5th Bilbao Masters tournament. The tournament was a 6-player double-round-robin, played using the soccer-like scoring system (3 points for a win, 1 for a draw, 0 for a loss). The other five participants included Carlsen, Vallejo Pons, Aronian, Fabiano Caruana, and Sergey Karjakin. Anand finished in the bottom half of the tournament, finishing 5th place out of 6 with a −1 score (losing 1 game to Carlsen in Round 9).
- 4th London Chess Classic: From 1 to 10 December, Anand participated in the 2012 London Chess Classic. The tournament was a 9-player round-robin tournament, with points earned using the soccer-like scoring system. Because of the odd number of players in the tournament, one player sat out every round. Each player played 8 games with 24 maximum points. Anand finished at 50% by winning 1 game (against Gawain Jones) and losing one (to Michael Adams). The eventual winner of the tournament was Carlsen, who earned 18 points out of 24 (scoring his 5 wins against the 3 British grandmasters—Adams, Jones, and Luke McShane—and against Aronian and Judit Polgár).

=== 2013 ===
Anand participated in several high-level tournaments in 2013, including the Tata Steel Chess Tournament, Grenke Chess Classic, Zurich Chess Challenge, Alekhine Memorial, Tal Memorial, the 1st Norway Chess Tournament, and the London Chess Classic. He also participated in the 2013 World Chess Championship match against Magnus Carlsen.

- 75th Tata Steel Chess Tournament: From 12 to 27 January 2013, Anand participated in the 75th Tata Steel Chess Tournament, held in Wijk Aan Zee. He finished 3rd overall, scoring 8 points out of 13 (+4−1=8), just behind the winner and runner-up, Carlsen and Aronian.
- GRENKE Chess Classic Baden-Baden 2013: From 7 to 17 February 2013, Anand participated in the 2013 GRENKE Chess Classic, a tournament held in the German city of Baden-Baden. The other participants included Caruana, Adams, Arkadij Naiditsch, Daniel Fridman and Georg Meier. Anand took clear 1st place after scoring 6½ points out of 10, defeating Naiditsch twice in their two encounters in the tournament and Fridman once.
- 2nd Zurich Chess Challenge: From 23 February – 1 March 2013, Anand participated in the Zurich Chess Challenge 2013, along with Caruana, Kramnik, and Gelfand. The tournament was a 4-player double-round robin. Caruana won, scoring 4 points out of 6 (defeating Anand and Gelfand). Anand finished 2nd with 50% (moving to an equal score after defeating Kramnik in the final round).
- Alekhine Memorial 2013: Anand participated in the 2013 Alekhine Memorial tournament, held from 20 April to 1 May. The tournament was a 10-player, 9-round single round robin played in two venues, Tuileries Garden in Paris and the Russian Museum in Saint Petersburg. Anand finished third, with +2−1=6.
- Norway Chess 2013: The 1st Norway Chess Super Tournament took place from 8 to 18 May 2013. The tournament was a 10-player, 9-round single round robin played in the Stavanger area, Norway. Participants included Aronian, Topalov, Karjakin, Carlsen, Nakamura, Svidler, Teimour Radjabov, Jon Ludvig Hammer, and Wang Hao. Anand scored +1 in the tournament (5 points out of 9 (+3−2=4)), defeating tail-enders Hammer, Topalov, and Radjabov but losing to Wang and Nakamura. Overall, he placed 6th out of 10.
- Tal Memorial 2013: The 8th Tal Memorial tournament took place from 12 to 24 June June 2013. The tournament was a 10-player, 9-round single round robin played in Moscow. Anand took 2nd place in the Blitz tournament that decided the colour order for the main classical tournament (behind Nakamura). In the classical tournament, he finished 9th out of 10, scoring a win against Alexander Morozevich but losing to Caruana, Nakamura, and Carlsen. Gelfand took clear first place with 6/9, half a point clear of Carlsen.
- 2013 Chennai World Chess Championship: From 9 to 22 November 2013, Anand participated in a World Championship match against Magnus Carlsen. Earlier in the year, Carlsen had won the 2013 London Candidates Tournament. The championship was a scheduled 12-game match, played in Anand's hometown of Chennai, India, in the Hyatt Regency Chennai 5-star hotel. Anand lost the match 6½–3½, unable to win a single game and losing 3 games. The match only lasted 10 games before Carlsen was declared the winner.
- 5th London Chess Classic: From 7 to 15 December, Anand participated in the 2013 London Chess Classic. The tournament was a Super 16 Rapid Tournament, where 16 players were broken up into 4 mini groups and the top-scoring participants from each group played in a knockout rapid tournament. Anand was knocked out by Vladimir Kramnik in the quarterfinals. The eventual winner of the tournament was Hikaru Nakamura, who defeated Boris Gelfand in the finals.

=== 2014 ===
Viswanathan Anand won the World Chess Championship Candidates Tournament, which earned him a rematch against Magnus Carlsen for the World Championship. He also participated in the Dubai World Rapid and Blitz Championships, Zurich Chess Challenge, Bilbao Masters, and London Chess Classic.

- 3rd Zurich Chess Challenge: From 29 January – 4 February 2014, Anand participated in the Zurich Chess Challenge 2014. A biltz tournament was played on the opening day to determine the colour distribution for the classical tournament. The classical tournament consisted of 5 games played with classical time control. The last day of the tournament consisted of 5 rapid games. The classical games were worth 2 points for a victory, 1 point for a draw, and 0 points for a loss, while the rapid and blitz games were worth 1 point for a win, 0.5 points for a draw, and 0 points for a loss, thus placing greater importance on each classical result. Anand scored 2½ points out of 5 in the blitz tournament. In the classical phase of the tournament, Anand scored 2/5, losing his first two games to Levon Aronian and Hikaru Nakamura respectively, drawing against Fabiano Caruana and Magnus Carlsen in rounds 3 and 5 respectively, and defeating Boris Gelfand in Round 4. In the final rapid tournament, Anand finished last, scoring 1 point out of 5 (+0−3=2). In the overall tournament, Anand finished in 5th place out of 6.
- 2014 World Chess Championship Candidates Tournament: As part of the qualification cycle for the World Chess Championship 2014, Viswanathan Anand participated in the Candidates Tournament, held in Khanty-Mansiysk, Russia from 13 to 31 March 2014 in the Ugra Chess Academy. The participants of the tournament included Veselin Topalov and Shakriyar Mamedyarov, both of whom qualified through winning the top two spots in the FIDE Grand Prix 2012–13. Viswanathan Anand won the Candidates Tournament by remaining undefeated and scoring victories over Levon Aronian (in round 1), Shakriyar Mamedyarov (in Round 3), and Veselin Topalov (in Round 9). This guaranteed his spot as challenger to Magnus Carlsen in the Sochi World Chess Championship match. By drawing against Sergey Karjakin in Round 13, he was able to secure the challenger spot with 1 round to spare.
- 2014 Dubai World Rapid and Blitz Chess Championship: From 16 to 20 June, Anand participated in the World Rapid and Blitz Chess Championships. The Rapid Championship was 15 rounds, while the Blitz Championship was 21 rounds. Anand scored an undefeated 10½ points out of 15 in the Rapid, earning him 3rd spot (behind winner Magnus Carlsen and runner-up Fabiano Caruana) and the bronze medal. In the Blitz, Anand scored 13½ points out of 21, which was good for tied 5th to 8th but placed 7th overall.
- 2014 Bilbao Masters — Grand Slam: From 14 to 20 September 2014, Anand participated in the 7th Bilbao Masters tournament. The tournament was a 4-player double-round-robin, played using the soccer-like scoring system (3 points for a win, 1 point for a draw, 0 points for a loss). The other three participants included Levon Aronian, Ruslan Ponomariov, and Francisco Vallejo Pons. Anand won the tournament by scoring 3 wins (2 against Vallejo Pons and 1 against Ponomariov) and 1 final loss (to Levon Aronian), giving him 11 points out of 18.
- 2014 Sochi World Chess Championship: From 7 to 28 November 2014, Anand participated in a rematch against Magnus Carlsen after having won the Khanty-Mansiysk Candidates Tournament. The match was a 12-game match, played in Sochi, Russia. Anand lost the match 6½–4½, having equalized the score in Round 3 after losing Round 2 but losing two more subsequent games in Rounds 6 and 11.
- 6th London Chess Classic: From 6 to 14 December, Anand participated in the 2014 London Chess Classic. The other 5 tournament participants included Vladimir Kramnik, Anish Giri, Fabiano Caruana, Hikaru Nakamura, and Michael Adams. Vishy finished the tournament with 7 points (+1−0=4), equal with Kramnik and Giri. However, Anand was declared the winner because the tiebreak rules stated that the player with the greater number of black wins has a better tiebreak. With Anand's last round win over Michael Adams, he secured tournament victory and his 3rd tournament win in 2014.

=== 2015 ===
In 2015, Viswanathan Anand was a participant in the inaugural 2015 Grand Chess Tour, a series of 3 super-tournaments featuring the world's elite players. The three tournaments that Anand participated in were Norway Chess, Sinquefield Cup, and London Chess Classic. Among these tournaments, Anand also participated in the Berlin World Rapid and Blitz Championships, GRENKE Chess, Zurich Chess Challenge, Bilbao Chess Masters Final, and Shamkir Chess.

- GRENKE Chess Classic (Baden-Baden): Viswanathan Anand began the 2015 year by participating in the GRENKE Chess Classic. The tournament, held from 2–9 February 2015 in the city of Baden-Baden, Baden-Württemberg, Germany, was an 8-player round-robin consisting of 7 rounds. Anand scored 2½ points out of 7 (+1−3=7), placing 7th out of 8.
- 4th Zurich Chess Challenge: From 13 to 19 February, Anand participated in the Zurich Chess Challenge 2015. A Blitz Tournament on the opening day was played to determine the distribution of colours for the Classical Tournament. The classical tournament consisted of 5 games played with classical time control. The last day of the tournament consisted of 5 rapid games. The classical games were worth 2 points for a victory, 1 point for a draw, and 0 points for a loss, while the Rapid and Blitz games were worth 1 point for a win, 0.5 points for a draw, and 0 points for a loss, thus placing greater importance on each classical result. The rules also stated that players who drew before their 40th move would have to play a rapid game (that would not count in the tournament standings). Anand scored 3½ points out of 5 possible points in the opening Blitz tournament (+3−1=1). He won the Classical tournament, scoring 2 victories and 3 draws. He defeated Levon Aronian in Round 2 and Hikaru Nakamura in Round 4. In the final Rapid Tournament, Anand scored 2 points out of 5 (+1−2=2). However, because Anand and Nakamura were tied for the overall Zurich Chess Challenge in number of total points, they played a blitz Armageddon game, which Nakamura won, defeating Anand with the black pieces. Therefore, Anand came in second in the overall Zurich Chess Challenge.
- Shamkir Chess (Gashimov Memorial 2015): From 16 to 25 April 2015, Anand participated in the 2nd Gashimov Memorial, in honour of the late Vugar Gashimov. It was a 9-round, 10-player single-round robin classical tournament, held in the town of Şəmkir, Azerbaijan. Anand scored an overall +3 score, defeating Wesley So, Michael Adams, and Shakriyar Mamedyarov. He finished the tournament undefeated and in second place, behind winner Magnus Carlsen (whom he was better against in their individual encounter in Game 1).
- Norway Chess 2015: Anand competed in Norway Chess 2015, the first leg of the Grand Chess Tour. This specific tournament was held in Stavanger, Norway, from 15 to 26 June 2015. The Blitz portion of the tournament was used to determine the colours and pairings of the main classical stage. In the Blitz tournament, Anand scored 5½ points out of 9 (+4−2=3). In the Classical part of the tournament, the final standings through which the Grand Chess Tour points are awarded, Anand finished 2nd and undefeated (+3−0=6) and earned himself 10 Grand Chess Tour points, behind the winner of the tournament Veselin Topalov. He also reached an almost career-high rating of 2816 after the tournament and earned victories against Magnus Carlsen, Maxime Vachier-Lagrave, and Jon Ludvig Hammer, the latter of whom was the wildcard of the tournament.
- Sinquefield Cup 2015: Anand competed in the 3rd Sinquefield Cup, the second leg of the Grand Chess Tour. This specific tournament was held in the Chess Club and Scholastic Center of Saint Louis in St. Louis, Missouri, from 22 August – 3 September 2015. Similar to Norway Chess, the tournament featured the 9 overall Grand Chess Tour participants and 1 wild card in a 9-round single-round robin tournament. The wild card in this tournament was Wesley So, who had just recently switched federations from the Philippines to the United States. Anand started off the tournament with 2 losses, against Hikaru Nakamura and Alexander Grischuk and ended the tournament with 7 draws. This gave him an overall score of −2 (+0−2=7), or 3½ points out of 9, earning him 2 Grand Chess Tour points.
- World Rapid and Blitz Championships: From 10 to 14 October 2015, Anand participated in the World Rapid and Blitz Championships in Berlin, Germany. In the Rapid Championship, Anand scored 9½ points out of 15 (+8−4=3). In the Blitz Championship, Anand scored 13 points out of 21 (+7−2=12).
- 2015 Bilbao Masters — Grand Slam: From 26 October – 1 November 2015, Anand participated in the 8th Grand Slam Masters Final in Bilbao, Spain. The format of the tournament was a 4-player double round-robin featuring 6 rounds of classical chess, using the soccer-like scoring system (3 points for a win, 1 point for a draw, 0 points for a loss). Out of the 12 games played in the tournament, only 2 games were decisive. Anand finished the tournament on the bottom half (+0−1=5), losing a single game to Anish Giri.
- 7th London Chess Classic: Anand competed in the London Chess Classic, the third and final leg of the Grand Chess Tour. This specific tournament was held in the Olympia Conference Centre in London, England, from 4–13 December 2015. Similar to Norway Chess and the Sinquefield Cup tournaments, the London Chess Classic featured the 9 overall Grand Chess Tour participants and 1 wild card in a 9-round single-round robin tournament. The wild card in this tournament was Michael Adams. Anand scored 3½ points out of 9 in the Classic, earning 1 victory against Veselin Topalov but losing to Hikaru Nakamura, Alexander Grischuk, and Maxime Vachier-Lagrave. He finished the tournament in 9th place and earned 2 Grand Chess Tour points.

Overall, because of his performances in the Sinquefield Cup and the London Chess Classic, Anand finished 8th out of the main 9 Grand Chess Tour main participants – 14 Grand Chess tour points out of 39 maximum.

=== 2016 ===
Viswanathan Anand was a participant in the 2nd Grand Chess Tour, a series of four super-tournaments featuring the world's elite players: the Paris, France, and Leuven, Belgium, Rapid and Blitz tournaments (replacements for the Norway Chess tournament), 2016 Sinquefield Cup, and the 2016 London Chess Classic. The three best tournament results for each participant would be used to determine his final tour standings at the end of the year. Anand declined to participate in the Paris Rapid and Blitz tournament, meaning his results in Leuven, the Sinquefield Cup and the London Chess Classic would count toward the overall standings. Additionally, Anand qualified for the 2016 World Chess Championship Candidates tournament by virtue of losing the 2014 World Chess Championship match.

- Gibraltar Chess Open: In 2016, Anand played in the Gibraltar open, his first open in 23 years. Anand finished with 5 wins, 2 losses and 3 draws. The losses were against Réunion-born Adrien Demuth and Hungarian talent Benjámin Gledura. Anand's classical rating dropped 21.9 points.
- 5th Zurich Chess Challenge: From 12 to 15 February 2016, Anand played in the Zurich Chess Challenge 2016, which was broken up into a Rapid section and a blitz section. This rapid section of the tournament was played with a modified time control of 40 minutes for the game with 10 additional seconds per move. The other 5 players of the tournament included Hikaru Nakamura, Levon Aronian, Vladimir Kramnik, Anish Giri, and Alexei Shirov. Anand scored victories over Aronian and Giri in the first two games of the Rapid tournament. He eventually tied for first with Nakamura with 10½ points, after Nakamura won the final blitz game against Aronian; however Nakamura won the tournament on a Sonneborn-Berger tiebreaker.
- 2016 World Chess Championship Candidates Tournament: As part of the qualification cycle for the World Chess Championship 2016, Viswanathan Anand participated in the Candidates Tournament, held in Moscow, Russia from 10 to 30 March 2016 in the Central Telegraph (Центральный телеграф) Building. The lineup of the tournament included Fabiano Caruana and Hikaru Nakamura, both of whom qualified through winning the top two spots in the FIDE Grand Prix 2014–15. Sergey Karjakin and Peter Svidler qualified by becoming winner and runner-up (respectively) of the Chess World Cup 2015 Knockout tournament. Veselin Topalov and Anish Giri qualified by rating. Anand qualified by virtue of losing the 2014 World Chess Championship match against Magnus Carlsen. Finally Levon Aronian qualified as the organizers' Wild Card. Anand finished in shared second place with Fabiano Caruana, one point behind the tournament winner Sergey Karjakin. Anand had the unique distinction of being the only player to have beaten the winner Karjakin in the 2016 Candidates Tournament.
- Leon Chess Masters Rapid Tournament: Anand won the 29th Leon Masters Rapid Tournament by defeating Wei Yi and David Anton Guijarro.
- Leuven Grand Chess Tour: From 17 to 20 June 2016, Anand participated in the Leuven leg of the 2016 Grand Chess Tour. The Rapid tournament was a Single Round Robin, consisting of 9 rounds of Rapid Games. Time control for the Rapid tournament was 25 minutes + 10 seconds increment starting from move 1. The Blitz tournament was a Double Round Robin, consisting of 18 rounds of Blitz Games. Time control for the Blitz tournament was 5 minutes + 2 seconds increment starting from move 1. Each Rapid game counted for 2 points for a win, 1 point for a draw, and 0 points for a loss, while each Blitz game counted for 1 point for a win, 0.5 points for a draw and 0 points for a loss. Anand amassed 19½ points out of a maximum 27 points, earning him 4th place in the tournament (behind winner Magnus Carlsen, Wesley So, and Levon Aronian).
- Sinquefield Cup 2016: Anand competed in the 4th Sinquefield Cup, the third leg of the 2016 Grand Chess Tour. This specific tournament was held in the Chess Club and Scholastic Center of Saint Louis in St. Louis, Missouri, from 4 to 17 August 2016. Similar to the Paris and Leuven Grand Chess Tour Rapid and Blitz events, this tournament featured the 9 overall Grand Chess Tour participants and 1 wild card in a 9-round single-round robin tournament. The wild card in this tournament was Ding Liren. Anand tied for 2nd place – with Levon Aronian, Fabiano Caruana, and Veselin Topalov – behind winner Wesley So.
- Tal Memorial 2016: The 10th Tal Memorial tournament took place on 25 September 2016 in the Museum of Russian Impressionism in Moscow Russia. The lineup of the players included Vladimir Kramnik, Anish Giri, Boris Gelfand, Levon Aronian, Evgeny Tomashevsky, Li Chao, Shakriyar Mamedyarov, Ian Nepomniachtchi, and Peter Svidler. Anand finished with a +1 score, losing to Vladimir Kramnik and defeating Boris Gelfand and Shakriyar Mamedyarov.

=== 2017 ===
Viswanathan Anand participated in several high-level tournaments in 2017 including the World Rapid and Blitz Championship, the Isle of Man Championship, the Norway chess tournament, the Zurich Chess Challenge, the Leon Chess Masters Rapid Tournament and the FIDE World Cup, to which he returned after fifteen years. He also played in the Grand Chess Tour a series of five events: the Paris, Leuven and St. Louis rapid and blitz tournaments, the 2017 Sinquefield Cup and the 2017 London Chess Classic, with Anand declining to participate in the Paris Rapid and Blitz tournament. Anand made more than $450 000 in prize money in 2017.

- Zurich Chess Challenge 2017: Zurich Chess Challenge 2017 held from 12 to 17 April 2017, was divided into semi-classical (45 minutes per game+ 30 seconds per move) and blitz (10 minutes per game + 5 seconds per move) sections. The winner of a classical game was awarded 2 points for the overall standings, in case of a draw each player gets 1 point and the loser 0 points, while a win in a blitz game is awarded one point and a draw 0.5 points respectively. Anand finished third in the semi-classical section with a score of 4½/7 (+4−2=1) and second in the blitz section with a score of 4½/7 (+2−0=5), giving him a combined score of 13½/21 for a third-place finish.
- Norway Chess Tournament 2017: The fifth Norway Chess tournament was held from 6–16 June 2017 in Stavanger, Norway. The tournament was a 10 player round robin involving all ten of the world's best players by rating (at the time of announcement) and had an average Elo rating of 2797. Anand finished in eighth place scoring 4/9 (+1−2=6).
- Sinquefield Cup 2017: Anand competed in the Sinquefield Cup, held at the Chess Club and Scholastic Centre of Saint Louis from 2 to 11 August 2017. The event was the 3rd leg of the 2017 Grand Chess Tour, with nine tour regulars joined by wild card Peter Svidler, in a 9-round single-round robin tournament. Anand finished with a score of 5½/9 (+2−0=7) with victories over Ian Nepomniachtchi and Fabiano Caruana. In the final standings he placed joint second with Magnus Carlsen, behind the winner Maxime Vachier-Lagrave.
- Isle of Man Championship 2017: Anand participated in the 2017 Isle of Man Championship, a 9-round Swiss tournament, held from 23 September to 1 November. Anand finished joint-second with Hikaru Nakamura with a score of 7/9 (+5−0=4), behind the winner Magnus Carlsen.
- Chess World Cup 2017: Anand played in the Chess World Cup 2017 a 128-player single-elimination chess tournament, held in Tbilisi, Georgia, from 2 to 27 September 2017. Anand was eliminated in the second round, losing to the Canadian Grandmaster Anton Kovalyov. Kovalyov won the first game with the black pieces after a dubious sacrifice from Anand and drew the second game with white to win the match. This was Anand's earliest exit in a knockout tournament at the World Championship/World Cup level.
- King Salman FIDE World Rapid and Blitz Championship: Anand won the World Rapid Championship held in the Saudi Arabian capital of Riyadh from 26 to 28 December. The rapid tournament was a 15-round Swiss open, Anand finished 10½/15 in a three-way tie with Ian Nepomniachtchi and Vladimir Fedoseev. Anand won the tie break over Vladimir Fedoseev 2–0. Anand finished third in the FIDE World Blitz Championship, a 21-round Swiss held from 29 to 30 December. Anand finished 14½/21, behind Sergey Karjakin at 14½/21 (ahead on tie-break) and Magnus Carlsen at 16/21.

=== 2018 ===
- 80th Tata Steel Masters: Anand played in the 2018 Tata Steel Masters, held from 13 to 28 January 2018. Anand finished fifth with a score of 8/13 (+4−1=8).
- Tal Memorial 2018: Anand won the 11th Tal Memorial tournament (rapid section) with a score of 6/9. The lineup of the players included Vladimir Kramnik, Hikaru Nakamura, Boris Gelfand, Shakriyar Mamedyarov, Ian Nepomniachtchi, and Peter Svidler. Anand defeated Ian Nepomniachtchi, Hikaru Nakamura, Daniil Dubov, Alexander Grischuk and drew the final round with Boris Gelfand to finish with a +3 score.
- 5th Grenke Chess Classic:From 31 March to 9 April 2018, Anand participated in the 5th Grenke Chess Classic. He finished eighth with a score of 3½/9 (+0–2=7).
- 6th Norway Chess: From 28 May to 7 June, he competed in the sixth edition of Norway Chess, placing fourth with 4½/8 (+2–1=5).
- 1st Tata Steel India Rapid & Blitz Tournament: In November 2018, he competed in the inaugural Tata Steel Chess India Rapid & Blitz tournament held in Kolkata, winning the blitz portion of the event.

=== 2019 ===
- 81st Tata Steel Masters: In January he competed in the 81st Tata Steel Masters tournament held in Wijk aan Zee. There he scored 7½/13 which netted him a third-place finish. The 3rd place was shared with Ian Nepomniachtchi and Ding Liren.
- 2019 Gashimov Memorial: He placed third in the 2019 Gashimov Memorial tournament. His final score was 4½/9 and his placement was shared with Teimour Radjabov and Alexander Grischuk. The event was held from 30 March to 9 April in Şəmkir.

=== 2020 ===
Anand played in the Tata Steel tournament in Netherlands, finishing 7th with a 50% score in January. He was also notably a part of the Indian team for the online chess Olympiad played on chess.com due to the Covid pandemic, the Indian team was declared 'joint winners' alongside Russia. His short victory against Grandmaster Ian Nepomniachtchi in just 17 moves in the FIDE Online Nations Cup also gained a lot of traction.

=== 2021 ===
In July, Anand played a four-game match of No Castling Chess against Vladimir Kramnik at Dortmund. Anand won the first game, and the next three were drawn, winning the match 2½−1½. Anand also finished second in the Croatian leg of the Grand Chess Tour Rapid and Blitz 2021, playing against notable grandmasters like Ian Nepomniachtchi and Garry Kasparov. Anand also played in the Vugar Gashimov Memorial tournament in Azerbaijan in December, where he gave a poor performance.

=== 2022 ===
Anand defeated Magnus Carlsen for the first time in almost five years at the 2022 Norway Chess Blitz in May. Anand finished third in the main (Classical) event in the Norway chess tournament, defeating Grandmasters Topalov and Maxime Vachier Lagrave, and suffering a shocking loss to Grandmaster Mamedyarov. He reentered the list of the top ten players in the world in classical chess during the event. Anand also played in the Warsaw leg of the Grand Chess Tour (Rapid and Blitz), where he won the Rapid segment with a strong 7/9, losing in an unfortunate game to Grandmaster Richard Rapport in the last round. He finished joint second (third on tiebreaks) in the overall event.

=== 2023 ===
Anand competed in the Zagreb Grand Chess Tour (Rapid and Blitz) finishing 8th out of a field of 10 Grandmasters. He recovered in the Levitov Chess Week Rapid event, where he finished 4th among 10 Grandmasters, including notable players like Grandmasters Vladimir Kramnik, Wesley So and Ian Nepomniachtchi. Anand scored 10/18 in the event, which had a double round robin format.

=== 2024 ===
Anand took part in three rounds of the German Chess Bundesliga (Classical format) from 23–25 February, scoring 2/3 against 3 top players, including Hikaru Nakamura, and Nijat Abasov, who were set to play in the Candidates in April. His performance included a 47 move victory against Abasov. He also won the Leon Masters for the 10th time in his career, after defeating Veselin Topalov 2½−1½ in the semifinals, and then proceeding to defeat Grandmaster Jamie Santos 3−1, on 30 June. Anand also took part in the second Global Chess League season, held in London, where he scored a forgettable 2/10, losing 6 out of the 10 rapid games. He then played in the WR Chess masters Cup, also held in London (classical knockout format) where he lost in the quarterfinals to Grandmaster Praggnanandhaa in the tiebreak game after drawing both classical games.

=== Rating ===
In the April 2007 FIDE Elo rating list, Anand was ranked first in the world for the first time, and he held the number-one spot in all ratings lists but one since then until July 2008, the exception being the January 2008 list, where he was rated No. 2 behind Vladimir Kramnik (equal rating, but Kramnik held the No. 1 spot due to more games played). He dropped to No. 5 in the October 2008 list, the first time he had been outside the top 3 since July 1996.

In 2010, Anand announced that he would expand his tournament schedule, beginning in late 2010, in an effort to regain the world number one ranking from Magnus Carlsen. He achieved that goal on the November 2010 list with a rating of 2804, two points ahead of Magnus Carlsen, but was soon overtaken again by Carlsen, temporarily in January 2011 and then permanently in July 2011.

== Assessment ==
Lubomir Kavalek describes Anand as the most versatile world champion ever, pointing out that Anand is the only player to have won the world chess championship in tournament, match, and knockout format, as well as rapid time controls.

In an interview in 2011, Kramnik said about Anand: "I always considered him to be a colossal talent, one of the greatest in the whole history of chess"; and "I think that in terms of play Anand is in no way weaker than Kasparov but he's simply a little lazy, relaxed and only focuses on matches. In the last 5–6 years he's made a qualitative leap that's made it possible to consider him one of the great chess players." In an interview in 2020, Kramnik, while talking about his World Chess Championship match against Anand in 2008, mentioned: "Vishy is such a great player and he was in a fantastic form. He was such a powerful force that I do not know who could have stopped him then. Even Kasparov could not have managed it."

FIDE President Kirsan Ilyumzhinov commented that Anand's victory in the 2014 Candidates Tournament "...proved that he is one of the strongest and greatest players of modern times".

In an interview in 2014, Alexander Grischuk said about Anand: "I have to say that of all the players I've played against Anand has personally struck me as the strongest, of course after Kasparov."

Career-wise though, Anand was thoroughly dominated by Kasparov. In classical games, Kasparov beat Anand 15 to 3 with 30 draws. In rapid/exhibition games, Kasparov beat Anand 11 to 7 with 16 draws. Though he has a losing record against Carlsen, his numbers are somewhat better. In classical games, Carlsen beat Anand 12 to 8 with 51 draws, and in rapid/exhibition games, Carlsen beat Anand 28 to 12 with 31 draws. He and Kramnik played 93 classical chess games, of which Kramnik won eleven, Anand won eleven, and 71 games were drawn.

== Notable tournament and match successes ==
=== Classical international tournaments ===
- 1986 Arab-Asian International Chess Championship, Doha 1st
- 1987 Sakthi Finance Grandmasters Chess Tournament, Coimbatore 1st
- 1989 51st Hoogovens Chess Tournament, Wijk aan Zee 1st–4th
- 1990 Asian Zonal Tournament, Qatar
- 1990 Manchester Chess Festival, Manchester 1st
- 1990 Far East Bank International Open, Manila 1st–2nd
- 1990 Triveni Super Grandmasters Tournament, Delhi Joint 1st (with Kamsky)
- 1991–1992 Reggio Emilia Chess Tournament, Reggio Emilia 1st
- 1992 Goodrich Open International Tournament, Calcutta 1st–4th
- 1992 Euwe Memorial, Amsterdam 1st–2nd (with Short)
- 1992 Alekhine Memorial, Moscow 1st–2nd (with Gelfand)
- 1993 VSB Tournament, Amsterdam, 1st–3rd
- 1993 Madrid Tournament, 1st–3rd
- 1993 PCA Selection tournament, Groningen 1st–2nd (with Adams)
- 1993 Linares Chess Tournament, 2nd–3rd
- 1995 Tal Memorial, Riga, 2nd
- 1996 Dortmunder Schachtage, Dortmund (joint 1st with Kramnik)
- 1997 Torneo de Ajedrez, Dos Hermanas 1st–2nd (with Kramnik)
- 1997 Invesbanka Chess tournament, Belgrade 1st–2nd (with Ivanchuk)
- 1997 Credit Suisse Classic Tournament, Biel 1st
- 1998 60th Hoogovens Schaak Tornoi, Wijk aan Zee 1st–2nd (with Kramnik)
- 1998 Torneo International De Ajedrez, Linares 1st
- 1998 Madrid tournament, 1st
- 1998 Fontys International Chess Tournament, Tilburg 1st
- 1999 Linares Chess Tournament, 2nd–3rd
- 2000 FIDE World Cup, Shenyang 1st
- 2000 Dortmunder Schachtage, Dortmund, 2nd on tie-break after Kramnik
- 2001 Magistral Mérida GM tournament, 1st
- 2002 FIDE World Cup, Hyderabad 1st
- 2003 65th Corus Chess Tournament, Wijk aan Zee 1st
- 2004 66th Corus Chess Tournament, Wijk aan Zee 1st
- 2004 Dortmunder Schachtage, Dortmund 1st
- 2006 68th Corus Chess Tournament, Wijk aan Zee 1st–2nd (with Topalov)
- 2007 Linares Chess Tournament, Linares 1st
- 2007 FIDE World Championship Tournament, Mexico City 1st
- 2008 Linares Chess Tournament, Linares 1st
- 2010 Bilbao Chess Masters Final – Grand Slam Final, Bilbao 2nd
- 2010 London Chess Classic – London 1st–3rd, 2nd after tie-break
- 2011 Tata Steel Chess Tournament, Wijk aan Zee 2nd
- 2013 Grenke Chess Classic, Baden Baden 1st
- 2013 Zurich Chess Challenge, Zurich 2nd
- 2014 Candidates Tournament, Khanty Mansiysk 1st
- 2014 Bilbao Chess Masters Final (Grand Slam Final), Bilbao 1st
- 2014 London Chess Classic, London 1st on Tie-break
- 2015 Zurich Chess Challenge (classical section), Zurich 1st
- 2015 Shamkir Chess (Vugar Gashimov Memorial), Shamkir 2nd
- 2015 Norway Chess (Grand Chess Tour), Stavanger 2nd
- 2016 Candidates Tournament, Moscow 2nd–3rd
- 2016 Sinquefield Cup, Saint-Louis 2nd
- 2016 Champions Showdown, Saint-Louis 1st–2nd (with Topalov)
- 2017 Sinquefield Cup, Saint-Louis 2nd
- 2018 Norway Chess, Stavanger 2nd–4th

=== Rapid and exhibition tournaments ===
- 1989 India Active Chess Championship, Pune 1st
- 1989 2nd Asian Active Chess Championship, Hong Kong 1st
- 1994 Melody Amber Tournament, Monaco 1st
- 1994 PCA Grand Prix (Rapid), Moscow 1st
- 1994 Munich blitz tournament 1st
- 1996 Credit Swiss Rapid Chess Grand Prix, Geneva 1st
- 1996 Torneo Magistral de Ajedrez, Leon 1st
- 1996 Torneo Villarrobledo Rapid, 1st
- 1997 Melody Amber Tournament, Monaco 1st
- 1997 Chess Classic Rapid Championship, Frankfurst 1st, beat Karpov in the final
- 1998 Torneo Villarrobledo Rapid, 1st
- 1998 Torneo Magitral Communidad De Madrid, Madrid 1st
- 1998 Chess Classic Rapid Championship, Frankfurt 1st, beat Kramnik in the final
- 1998 Wydra Memorial Chess (Rapid), Haifa 1st
- 2000 Wydra International Tournament (Rapid), Haifa 1st
- 2000 Torneo Magistral de Ajedrez, Leon 1st, beat Shirov in the final
- 2000 Chess Classic Rapid Championship, Frankfurt 1st
- 2000 GSM Plus blitz World Cup, 1st
- 2000 Corsica Masters Knockout (Rapid), Bastia 1st
- 2001 Torneo Magistral de Ajedrez, Leon 1st, beat Shirov in the final
- 2001 Mirabal Rapid tournament, Madrid 1st
- 2001 Torneo Villarrobledo Rapid, 1st
- 2001 Corsica Masters Knockout (Rapid), Bastia 1st
- 2002 Corsica Masters Knockout (Rapid), Bastia 1st
- 2002 Eurotel (Combined Rapid plus Classical), Prague 1st
- 2003 Santurzi (Rapid and blindfold) 1st
- 2003 SIS Masters, Middelfart 1st
- 2003 FIDE World Rapid Chess Championship, Cap d'Agde 1st, beat Kramnik in the final 1½−½
- 2003 Corsica Masters Knockout (Rapid), Bastia 1st
- 2004 São Paulo Rapid, 1st
- 2004 Keres Memorial Rapid, Tallinn 1st
- 2004 Corsica Masters Knockout (Rapid), Bastia 1st
- 2005 Torneo Magistral de Ajedrez, Leon 1st, beat Qosimjonov in the final
- 2005 Corsican Circuit, Venaco Rapid, 1st
- 2006 Torneo Villarrobledo Rapid, 1st
- 2006 Torneo Magistral de Ajedrez, Leon 1st, beat Topalov in the final
- 2007 Torneo Magistral de Ajedrez, Leon 1st, beat Topalov in the final
- 2007 Mainz World Rapid Chess Championship, 1st, beat Aronian in the final
- 2008 Mainz World Rapid Chess Championship, 1st, beat Carlsen in the final
- 2011 Botvinnik Memorial, Moscow, 1st
- 2011 Corsica Masters Knockout (Rapid), Corsica 1st
- 2014 World Rapid Chess Championship (Rapid), Dubai 3rd
- 2016 Zurich Chess Challenge (Rapid and blitz), Zurich 1st–2nd
- 2016 Torneo Magistral de Ajedrez, Leon 1st, beat Wei Yi in the final
- 2016 St. Louis Champions Tournament, St. Louis 1st
- 2017 World Rapid Chess Championship, Riyadh 1st
- 2017 World Blitz Chess Championship, Riyadh 3rd
- 2018 11th Tal Memorial Rapid, Moscow 1st
- 2018 1st Tata Steel India Rapid & Blitz Tournament (Blitz), Kolkata 1st
- 2019 Paris Grand Chess Tour blitz tournament, Paris 1st–3rd
- 2019 Levitov blitz tournament, Amsterdam 1st–2nd
- 2021 Croatia Grand Chess Tour, 2nd

=== Classical matches ===
- 1991 Madras, World Chess Championship Candidates match vs Alexey Dreev won 4½−1½
- 1992 Linares match Anand vs Vasyl Ivanchuk won 5–3
- 1994 Wijk aan Zee FIDE World Chess Championship Candidates match vs Artur Yusupov won 4½−2½
- 1994–5 PCA World Championship Candidates Cycle winner
  - 1994 New York World Chess Championship Candidates match vs Oleg Romanishin won 5−2
  - 1994 Linares World Chess Championship Candidates match vs Michael Adams won 5½−1½
  - 1995 Las Palmas World Chess Championship Candidates match vs Gata Kamsky won 6½−4½
- 2008 World Chess Championship vs Vladimir Kramnik; won 6½−4½
- 2010 World Chess Championship vs Veselin Topalov; won 6½−5½
- 2012 World Chess Championship vs Boris Gelfand; won 8½−7½ (2½−1½ in rapid tiebreaks)

=== Rapid Matches ===
- 1997 Aegon Man vs Computers chess event (clock simultan vs 6 programs) won 4–2
- 1997 Leon match Anand vs Miguel Illescas 4½−1½
- 1999 Magistral de Ajedrez Ciudad de Leon, Advanced Chess Rapid match vs Anatoly Karpov 5–1
- 2001 Mainz Chess Classic World Rapid Championship vs Kramnik; won 6½−5½
- 2002 Mainz Chess Classic World Rapid Championship vs Ruslan Ponomariov; won 4½−3½
- 2003 Mainz Chess Classic World Rapid Championship vs Judit Polgár; won 5−3
- 2004 Mainz Chess Classic World Rapid Championship vs Alexei Shirov; won 5−3
- 2005 Mainz Chess Classic World Rapid Championship vs Alexander Grischuk; won 5−3
- 2006 Mainz Chess Classic World Rapid Championship vs Teimour Radjabov; won 5−3
- 2011 Leon Rapid match vs Shirov; won 4½−1½

== Awards ==
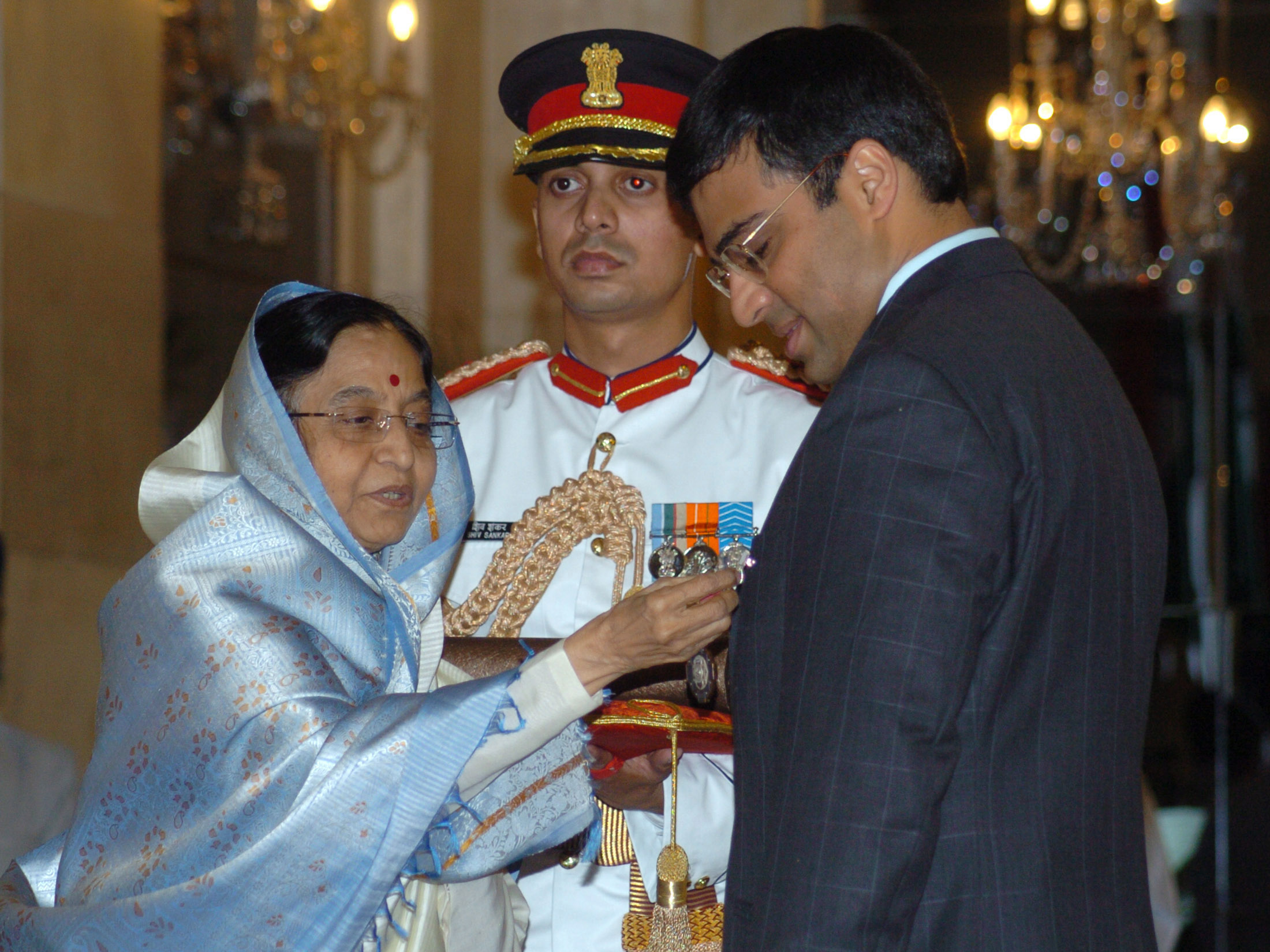
The President, Smt. Pratibha Devisingh Patil presenting the Padma Vibhushan to Shri Viswanathan Anand, at Rashtrapati Bhavan, in 2008

Anand has received many national and international awards.

=== Indian national honours ===
- Arjuna Award for Outstanding Indian sportsperson in Chess in 1985.
- Padma Shri – The fourth highest civilian award awarded by Government of India in 1988.
- The Major Dhyan Chand Khel Ratna Award in its inaugural Rajiv Gandhi Khel Ratna Award, India's highest sporting honour in the years 1991–1992.
- Padma Bhushan – Third highest civilian award awarded by Government of India in 2001.
- Padma Vibhushan – Second highest civilian award awarded by Government of India in 2008.

=== Other honours ===
- National Citizens Award and Soviet Land Nehru Award in 1987
- British Chess Federation "Book of the Year" Award in 1998 for his book My Best Games of Chess.
- Anand has won the Chess Oscar six times, in the years 1997, 1998, 2003, 2004, 2007 and 2008. The Chess Oscar is awarded to the year's best player according to a worldwide poll of leading chess critics, writers, and journalists conducted by the Russian chess magazine 64.
- Sportstar Best Sportsperson of the Year for 1995
- Sportstar Millennium Award in 1998, from India's premier sports magazine for being the sportsperson of the millennium.
- Nilesh Murali and Rahul Desirazu Excellence in Chess Award (2004, 2007)
- "Global Strategist Award" for mastering many formats of World Chess Championships by NASSCOM in 2011.
- Tamil Nadu chief minister J. Jayalalithaa honoured Anand with a cheque of ₹2 crore (US$210,000), for winning the World Chess Championship for the fifth time.
- In 2012, he received the "Indian sportsperson of the year" and "Indian of the year" awards.
- In 2014 Anand was awarded the Russian Order of Friendship for the development of economic, scientific and cultural ties with Russia. The Order of Friendship was awarded to Viswanathan Anand and Boris Gelfand, the participants in the FIDE World Chess Championship Match that was held at the State Tretyakov Gallery in Moscow in 2012.
- In 2015 Anand was honoured with the top country award at the Spanish embassy, Delhi on 8 January. It is given to the eminent people of Indian origin who helped to bring glory to both India and Spain.
- 4538 Vishyanand (provisional designation 1988 TP) is a main-belt minor planet. It was discovered by Kenzo Suzuki in Toyota, Aichi Prefecture, on 10 October 1988 and was named after Vishy on 1 April 2015.
- P.C. Chandra Puraskaar 2016 by P.C. Chandra Jewellers

== Charity ==
Anand participated in a charity simul called "Checkmate COVID" to support COVID-19 relief along with fellow Indian Grandmasters Koneru Humpy, Harika Dronavalli, Nihal Sarin, and Praggnanandhaa Rameshbabu. These 5 Grandmasters played online against 100 opponents on Chess.com platform. The time control for the games was 30 minutes with a 30-second increment with the grandmasters having 15 extra minutes on their clock. More than $50,000 were raised by this initiative. All the proceeds went to Red Cross India and the "Checkmate COVID" initiative of the All India Chess Federation (AICF).

== Notable games ==
- Anand vs. Bologan, New Delhi, 2000 World Championship; Ruy Lopez, Breyer (ECO C95)
Anand vs. Bologan, New Delhi 2000

Position: c8 black bishop, e8 black rook, f8 black bishop, h8 black king, c7 black rook, f7 black pawn, g7 black pawn, h7 black pawn, a6 black knight, d6 black pawn, d5 white pawn, g5 white pawn, h5 white knight, d4 white knight, e4 white pawn, f4 white queen, c3 black pawn, g3 white rook, h3 white pawn, b2 black queen, f2 white pawn, g2 white king, b1 white bishop, d1 white rook

Position after 36... c3
Anand, in an apparently worse position, finds an intuitive sacrifice that leads to a winning attack.

[Analysis by GM Ľubomír Ftáčnik]
1. e4 e5 2. Nf3 Nc6 3. Bb5 a6 4. Ba4 Nf6 5. 0-0 Be7 6. Re1 b5 7. Bb3 d6 8. c3 0-0 9. h3 Nb8 10. d4 Nbd7 11. Nbd2 Bb7 12. Bc2 Re8 13. Nf1 Bf8 14. Ng3 c5 15. d5 c4 16. Bg5 Qc7 17. Nf5 Kh8 18. g4 Ng8 19. Qd2 Nc5 20. Be3 Bc8 21. Ng3 Rb8 22. Kg2 a5 23. a3 Ne7 24. Rh1 Ng6 25. g5! b4!? Anand has a strong kingside attack, so Bologan seeks counterplay with the sacrifice of a pawn. 26. axb4 axb4 27. cxb4 Na6 28. Ra4 Nf4+ 29. Bxf4 exf4 30. Nh5 Qb6 31. Qxf4 Nxb4 32. Bb1 Rb7 33. Ra3 Rc7 34. Rd1 Na6 35. Nd4 Qxb2 36. Rg3 c3 (see diagram) 37. Nf6!! Re5 If 37...gxf6, 38.gxf6 h6 39.Rg1! Qd2! 40.Qh4 leaves White with an irresistible initiative. 38. g6! fxg6 39. Nd7 Be7 40. Nxe5 dxe5 41. Qf7 h6 42. Qe8+ 1–0 White forces mate in 12 moves if the game were to continue, with 42...Bf8 43.Rf3 Qa3 44.Rxf8+ Qxf8 45.Qxf8+ Kh7 46.d6 exd4 47.Ba2 h5 48.dxc7 Nb4 49.Qg8+ Kh6 50.f4 g5 51.f5 g4 52.h4 Bxf5 53.exf5 Nxa2 54.Qh8#.

- Levon Aronian vs Anand, 75th Tata Steel Chess Tournament, Wijk aan Zee, 2013, Round 4, Queen's Gambit Declined, Semi-Slav Defense (D49), 0-1.

Played in advance of his world chess championship match later that year, Anand plays an attacking masterpiece, sacrificing multiple pieces in a relentless attack against the white king in what is widely considered to be his immortal game.

Aronian vs Anand, Wijk aan Zee 2013

Position: h1 white king, f1 white rook, c1 white bishop, a1 white rook, g2 white pawn, b2 white pawn, h3 white pawn, e3 black bishop, d3 white queen, c3 white knight, a3 white pawn, g4 black knight, f4 white pawn, h5 black queen, f5 black pawn, b5 black pawn, e6 black pawn, g7 black pawn, b7 black bishop, a7 black pawn, g8 black king, c8 black rook

Position after 23.Be3
1.d4 d5 2.c4 c6 3.Nf3 Nf6 4.Nc3 e6 5.e3 Nbd7 6.Bd3 dxc4 7.Bxc4b5 8.Bd3 Bd6 9.O-O O-O 10.Qc2 Bb7 11.a3 Rc8 12.Ng5 c5 13.Nxh7 Ng4 14.f4? cxd4 15.exd4 Bc5 16.Be2 Nde5 17.Bxg4 Bxd4+ 18.Kh1 Nxg4 19.Nxf8 f5 20.Ng6 Qf6 21.h3? Qxg6 22.Qe2 Qh5 23.Qd3 Be3 0-1(diagram)
- Sergey Karjakin vs. Anand, 68th Corus Chess Tournament, Wijk aan Zee, 2006, Round 1, Sicilian Defence, Najdorf Variation (B90), 0-1.

After a highly theoretical battle in the opening, Anand begins attacking operations on Black, taking advantage of a blunder by Karjakin in order to sacrifice both a bishop and knight, before beginning a checkmate attack with just his rook and queen.

Karjakin vs. Anand, Wijk aan Zee 2006

Position: h1 white rook, d1 white rook, g2 white bishop, e3 white bishop, c3 white king, b3 black pawn, h4 white pawn, e4 white pawn, c4 black queen, a4 black rook, d6 black pawn, h7 black king, g7 black pawn, f8 white queen

Position after 37.Qc4+
1.e4 c5 2.Nf3 d6 3.d4 cxd4 4.Nxd4 Nf6 5.Nc3 a6 6.Be3 e5 7.Nb3 Be6 8.f3 Be7 9.Qd2 O-O 10.O-O-O Nbd7 11.g4 b5 12.g5 b4 13.Ne2 Ne8 14.f4 a5 15.f5 a4 16.Nbd4 exd4 17.Nxd4 b3 18.Kb1 bxc2+ 19.Nxc2 Bb3 20.axb3 axb3 21.Na3 Ne5 22.h4 Ra5 23.Qc3 Qa8 24.Bg2 Nc7 25.Qxc7 Rc8 26.Qxe7 Nc4 27.g6 hxg6 28.fxg6 Nxa3+ 29.bxa3 Rxa3 30.gxf7+ Kh7 31.f8=N+ Rxf8 32.Qxf8 Ra1+ 33.Kb2 Ra2+ 34.Kc3 Qa5+ 35.Kd3 Qb5+ 36.Kd4 Ra4+ 37.Kc3 Qc4+ 0-1 (diagram)
- Anand vs Veselin Topalov, World Chess Championship 2010, Game 4, Catalan Opening (E04),1-0.

Despite the Catalan's reputation as a positionally-oriented opening, Anand does the unexpected and turns it into a deadly mating attack, sacrificing a Knight in the process, in order to crush Topalov's king.

Anand vs Topalov, World Chess Championship 2010

Position: g1 white king, d1 white rook, c1 white rook, h2 white pawn, g2 white bishop, f2 white pawn, d2 white queen, b2 white pawn, g3 white pawn, b3 black pawn, e4 white pawn, b4 black knight, a4 black pawn, a5 black pawn, h6 white knight, e6 black pawn, d6 white knight, c6 black bishop, a6 black knight, g7 black pawn, f7 black pawn, a7 black queen, g8 black king, f8 black rook, d8 black rook

Position after 23.Nxh6+
1.d4 Nf6 2.c4 e6 3.Nf3 d5 4.g3 dxc4 5.Bg2 Bb4+ 6.Bd2 a5 7.Qc2 Bxd2+ 8.Qxd2 c6 9.a4 b5 10.Na3 Bd7 11.Ne5 Nd5 12.e4 Nb4 13.O-O O-O 14.Rfd1 Be8 15.d5 Qd6 16.Ng4 Qc5 17.Ne3 N8a6 18.dxc6 bxa4 19.Naxc4 Bxc6 20.Rac1 h6 21.Nd6 Qa7 22.Ng4 Rad8 23.Nxh6+ gxh6 24.Qxh6 f6 25.e5 Bxg2 26.exf6 Rxd6 27.Rxd6 Be4 28.Rxe6 Nd3 29.Rc2 Qh7 30.f7+ Qxf7 31.Rxe4 Qf5 32.Re7 1-0 (diagram)

== Personal life ==
Anand acquired the nickname "Vishy" when he started playing internationally; which was given to him by Maia Chiburdanidze during the Frunze International Tournament in 1987. While the name reflects ignorance of Tamil naming conventions, Anand was not offended and embraced the nickname.

Anand married Aruna in 1996 and has a son, born on 9 April 2011, named in the traditional patronymic way Anand Akhil.

Anand is a Hindu and stated that he visits temples to enjoy the tranquility and joy they symbolize. He has credited his daily prayers with helping him achieve a "heightened state of mind" that helps him focus better when playing chess.

In August 2010, Anand joined the board of directors of Olympic Gold Quest, a foundation for promoting and supporting India's elite sportspersons and potential young talent. On 24 December 2010, he was the guest of honour on the grounds of Gujarat University, where 20,486 players created a new world record of simultaneous chess play at a single venue.

His hobbies are astronomy, reading, swimming, and listening to music.

Anand has been regarded as an unassuming person with a reputation for refraining from political and psychological ploys and instead focusing on his game. This has made him a well-liked figure throughout the chess world for two decades, evidenced by the fact that Kasparov, Kramnik, and Carlsen, all of whom were rivals for the world championship during Anand's career, each aided him in his preparations for the 2010 World Chess Championship. Anand is sometimes known as the "Tiger of Madras".

Anand was the only sportsperson invited to the dinner Indian Prime Minister Manmohan Singh hosted for US President Barack Obama on 7 November 2010.

Anand was denied an honorary doctorate from University of Hyderabad because of confusion over his citizenship status; India's Minister of Human Resource Development Kapil Sibal later apologised and said, "There is no issue on the matter as Anand has agreed to accept the degree at a convenient time depending on his availability". According to The Hindu, Anand finally declined to accept the doctorate.

On 26 May 2015, Anand's mother died at age 79. On 15 April 2021, Anand's father died at age 92.

== Bibliography ==
- Viswanathan Anand (1998). My Best Games of Chess. Gambit Chess. ISBN 978-1901983548
- Viswanathan Anand and Devangshu Datta (2007). My Life in Chess. Everyman Chess. ISBN 978-1857444056
- Viswanathan Anand and Ninan, Susan (2019). Mind Master: Winning Lessons from a Champion's Life. Hachette India. ISBN 978-9351951506

== See also ==
- List of chess games between Anand and Kramnik

Awards
Preceded by Alexander Khalifman	FIDE World Chess Champion; 2000–2002	Succeeded by Ruslan Ponomariov
Preceded by Vladimir Kramnik	World Chess Champion; 2007–2013	Succeeded by Magnus Carlsen
Preceded by Garry Kasparov; Vasyl Ivanchuk	World Rapid Chess Champion; 2003–2009; 2017	Succeeded by Levon Aronian; Daniil Dubov
Preceded by Mikhail Tal	World Blitz Chess Champion; 2000–2006	Succeeded by Alexander Grischuk
Achievements
Preceded by Veselin Topalov; Vladimir Kramnik; Magnus Carlsen; Magnus Carlsen	World No. 1; 1 April – 31 December 2007; 1 April – 30 September 2008; 1 November – 31 December 2010; 1 March – 30 June 2011	Succeeded by Vladimir Kramnik; Veselin Topalov; Magnus Carlsen; Magnus Carlsen
