= Eros Riccio =

Italian chess champion (born 1977)

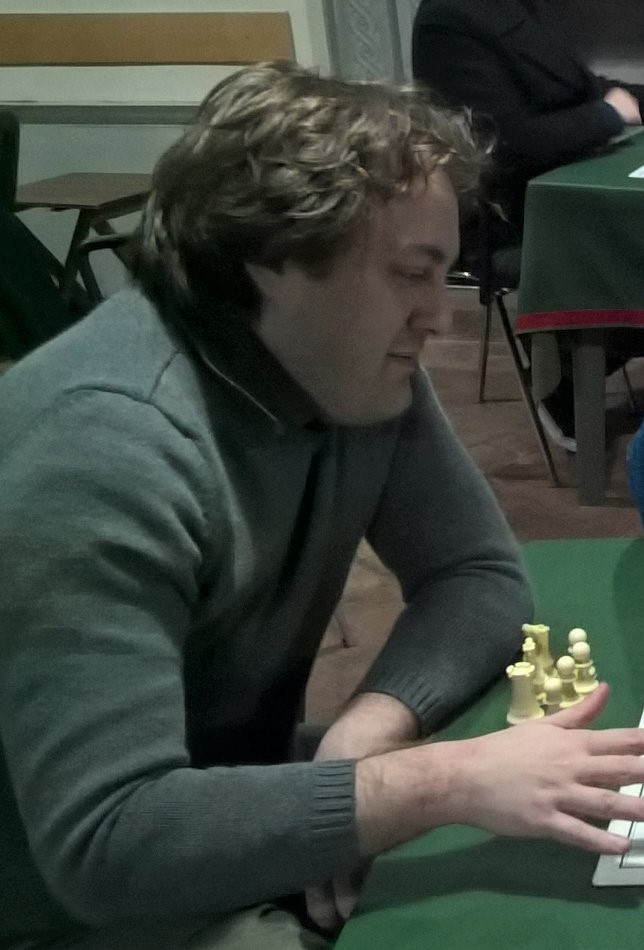
- Riccio in 2017

Personal information
- Born: 1 December 1977 (age 48) Lucca, Italy

Chess career
- Country: Italy
- Title: ICCF Grandmaster (2010)
- ICCF rating: 2640 (July 2020)
- ICCF peak rating: 2644 (April 2017)

Eros Riccio (born 1 December 1977, in Lucca) is an Italian International Correspondence Chess Grandmaster, Advanced Chess Champion and chess opening book author. He is FICGS World Champion and ICCF vice-European Champion and Olympic bronze with the Italian national team.

== Chess career ==
Riccio won the fourth, fifth, sixth, seventh, eighth, ninth, tenth, eleventh, twelfth, thirteenth, fourteenth, fifteenth, sixteenth and seventeenth FICGS Correspondence Chess World Championship. He also won three ICCF Italian championships (2006, 2009 and 2012).

In the world online tournaments of Freestyle chess ("Advanced chess", created by GM Garry Kasparov), Riccio won the first (2007) and the third edition (2010) of the FICGS Chess Freestyle Cup, the final of Computer Bild Spiele Schach Turnier (2008) and became the champion of the 8th PAL/CSS Freestyle Tournament (2008), winning the prestigious tournament sponsored by the PAL Group in Abu Dhabi (United Arab Emirates).

With his personal chess opening book, which he called Sikanda, Riccio also won the Welcome Freestyle Tournament (2008), the Christmas Freestyle Tournament (2008), the 1st IC Freestyle Masters (2009) and the 1st Freestyle Tournament (2012), organized by Infinity Chess.

Infinity Chess has developed a special Elo classification for centaurs (man + computer), which sees the first place right Eros Riccio (Sephiroth) with 2755 Elo points.

He stands out in various ICCF international tournaments with the Italian national team, of which becomes 1st board in the final of the "7th European Championship", with the silver medal to Italy, in the final of the "17th Olympiad", with the bronze medal to Italy, and in the final of the "18th Olympiad". With the Italian national team Riccio also wins the second silver medal in the final of the "8th European Championship" and the bronze medal in the final of the "9th European Championship".

In July 2009 Riccio (Auryn) beats Rechenschieber, the cluster of the Rybka team, a monster composed of very impressive 55 high-speed computers that function as a single powerful computer, and beats also Highendman, which was the only one before him to beat the Rybka cluster.

In 2013 wins the Umansky Memorial.

In 2021 his Elo ICCF was 2640 points and was 1st in the Italian ranking and 4th in the world ranking.

== See also ==
- Advanced Chess
