= Florence Mendheim =

American librarian

- Born: January 13, 1899; Illinois
- Died: August 1984; New York
- Occupation: Librarian

Florence Mendheim (January 13, 1899 – August 1984) was a New York Public Library branch librarian notable for her undercover surveillance of American Nazi groups in the pre-World War II 1930s. She was the daughter of German-Jewish immigrants and an observant Jew who practiced kosher dietary laws. Her personal papers, including documentation of her spy activities, are housed in the archives of the Leo Baeck Institute in New York.

== Life and career ==
Born in Illinois, one of three children of German-Jewish immigrants Bettie and Max Mendheim, she attended Washington Irving High School in New York City and completed New York Public Library training in 1918. She worked in various NYPL branch locations over the next twenty-five years, receiving both a bronze and a silver service medal in recognition of her years of employment. Correspondence from library administrators and supervisors indicate Ms. Mendheim had chronic health problems that led to her early retirement in the late 1940s, although little is known of her personal life. She also served as secretary of the Committee for Arab-Jewish Understanding, an organization attempting to negotiate compromise regarding the situation in Palestine in the late 1930s and 1940s. Mendheim's archives contain evidence of her literary aspirations as well, in the form of numerous manuscripts for articles, plays, poems, and stories. She was unmarried, and her papers were donated by her younger brother Arthur following her death at age 85.

== Undercover work ==
Mendheim's surveillance activities began in 1933 (or shortly after), with the establishment of the Nazi government in Germany and the formation of Nazi support organizations in New York. Her involvement was primarily with the group Friends of the New Germany and its successor organization the German American Bund. Under the assumed identity of Gertrude Mueller, Mendheim attended pro-Nazi meetings and rallies, and eventually accumulated a sizable collection of antisemitic propaganda produced locally, nationally, and abroad. According to archival documents, Mendheim's purchases of Nazi propaganda and literature were reimbursed by Rabbi Jacob Xenab Cohen of the American Jewish Congress, to whom she submitted regular narrative reports of her activities. This collaboration may have been part of the American Jewish Congress' efforts to monitor antisemitic violence and to boycott Nazism in the U.S. The records of Mendheim's undercover work, and perhaps the work itself, appears to have ceased by 1939.

== See also ==
- Arthur Derounian (aka John Roy Carlson)
