= Arthur Derounian =

Armenian-American journalist (1909–1991)

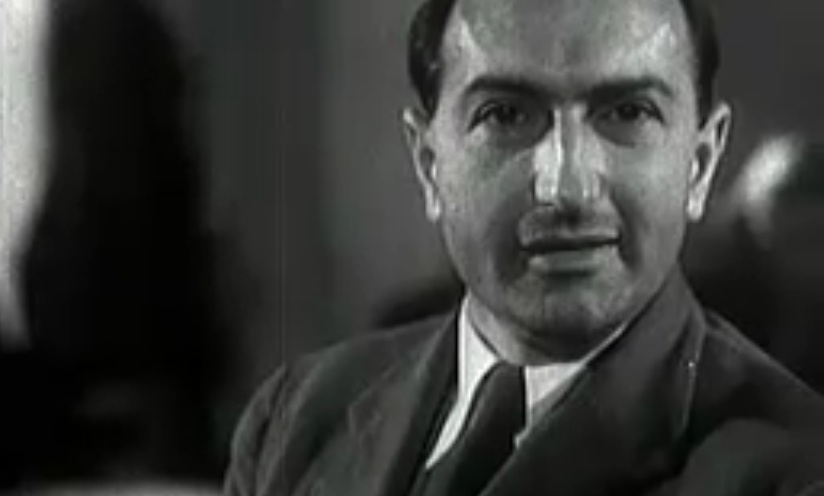
Derounian in 1949

Arthur Derounian (born Avedis Boghos Derounian (Armenian: Աւետիս Պօղոս Տէրունեան), April 9, 1909 – April 23, 1991), also known as John Roy Carlson among many pen names, was an Armenian-American journalist and author, the best-selling author of Under Cover.

Derounian wrote for the Armenian Mirror-Spectator, Fortune Magazine, the Council Against Intolerance and the Friends of Democracy. In the 1950s he founded and managed the Armenian Information Service.

Derounian is also notable for editing the manifesto of Armenia's first Prime Minister, Hovhannes Kajaznuni.

== Personal life ==
He was born to Boghos Derounian and Eliza Aprahamian in Dedeagach, Adrianople Vilayet, Ottoman Empire. The Balkan Wars and First World War had an unsettling effect on the entire region, and his hometown repeatedly changed hands. The family moved several times, spending time in Turkey and Sofia, Bulgaria, where his brother Steven Derounian (later elected to the U.S. House of Representatives) was born. Eventually the family emigrated to the United States, settling in Mineola, New York. He went on to study at New York University's School of Journalism. He married Marie Nazarian and had a daughter and a son.

He died of a heart attack on April 23, 1991, while researching at the library of the American Jewish Committee on East 56th Street.

== Undercover work ==
In 1933, Archbishop Leon Tourian was assassinated at the altar of his New York church. The assassins were members of the Dashnaks, a radical Armenian group who accused the Archbishop of treason to the Armenian national cause. Deeply shocked, Derounian spent the rest of his life opposing the Dashnaks as well as other violent radicals - in particular, fighting fascism and all forms of racism.

During the 1948 Israeli-Arab War, Derounian also infiltrated among the Arabs fighting the newborn Israel, travelling extensively in the Arab parts of the expiring Mandatory Palestine as well as in Egypt and Syria. His position on the Israeli-Arab Conflict, at the conclusion of his book Cairo to Damascus, was that "In the simplest of terms, Israel, as I saw it, represented Good; the Arab world represented Evil".

=== Under Cover ===
Under Cover: My Four Years in the Nazi Underworld of America - The Amazing Revelation of How Axis Agents and Our Enemies Within Are Now Plotting To Destroy the United States became a best seller when published in 1943.

Derounian was an investigator of subversive activity, and infiltrated numerous "patriotic" groups, some of which he listed in the opening of his book Under Cover: German American Bund, Christian Front, American Nationalist Party, American Women Against Communism, The Gray Shirts, America First Committee, Christian Mobilizers, The American Defense Society, Anglo-Saxon Federation of America, National Workers League, Yankee Freemen, Flanders Hall, American Patriots among many others.

Among the groups he also helped expose was the international Nazi propaganda news agency World-Service.

He was also the chief investigator of the anti-fascist organization Friends of Democracy.

In a speech Representative Arthur G. Klein attempted to give in the US House in 1944 and which was printed in The Nation, Klein praises Derounian's book Under Cover:

They (Americans) fail to understand, for instance, the reasons for and the character of the attack on John Roy Carlson, whose book, Under Cover has opened the eyes of so many to the existence of subversive propaganda and propagandists in our own midst. They are puzzled that the broad and profound values of the book should be overlooked and thrust aside because of trivialities.....For the issues that are treated in the book, the revelations that are made, and their high average of accuracy are far too important for light dismissal.

==== Lawsuits related to Under Cover ====
This expose made him enemies, and several parties instituted actions against him for alleged libelous material. Three of the four cases failed the consolidated case before the jury, leaving a verdict in favor only of lawyer Jeremiah Stokes, which was later overturned. The lawsuit claimed that Derounian had held Stokes up for ridicule. Stokes is first mentioned on page 365 of Under Cover, and his patriotism questioned in the next chapter, which begins:

I was in the room alone with two men. The one who had pumped both my hands in welcome was a small round man with a bald dome and rotund face. He had small, beady eyes and he peered at you from behind rimmed glasses. He was definitely of the single-track, uncompromising zealot type. Jeremiah Stokes had let his law practice slide and was devoting the major portion of his time to the writing of "patriotic" tracts.

Derounian appealed; the appellate court reversed the district court and remanded the matter, stating in the overview:

The court found error in the submission to the jury of a physical description of the individual as small and rotund in stature, bald, round of face, and having small and beady eyes. The description of the individual was not reasonably calculated to subject him to public ridicule. It was an error to submit to the jury ridicule of personal appearance as an element of damages.

=== "Cairo to Damascus" ===
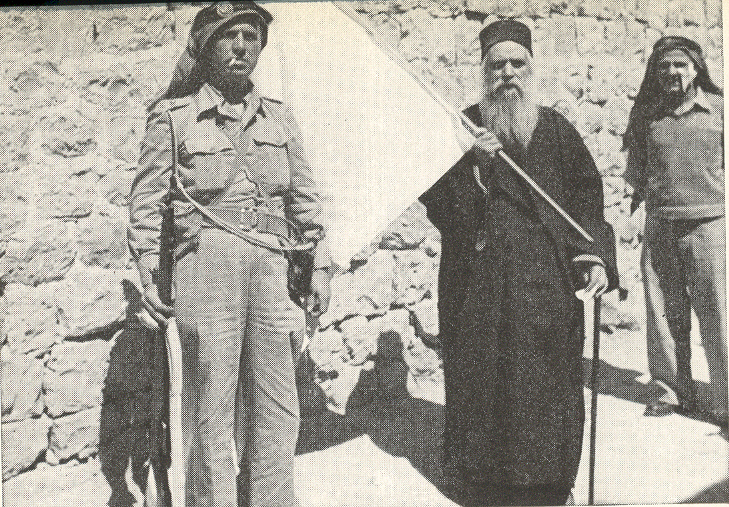
Surrender of Jewish Quarter, photo by Arthur Derounian "John Roy Carlson" in Cairo to Damascus- Rabbi Ben Zion Hazzan Ireq (72), Jerusalem, March 28, 1948

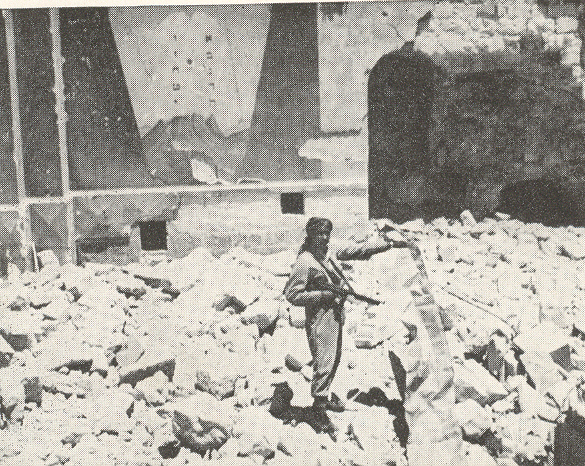
Arab Legion soldier in ruins of Hurva - photo by Arthur Derounian ("John Roy Carlson") in Cairo to Damascus

Shortly after the publication of Under Cover, Derounian set himself with an assignment: to go undercover again and investigate the collaboration of Nazi and antisemitic people and organizations with the Arabs in the civil war that broke out in Palestine after the UN resolution to partition the country, a war that would be the early stage of the 1948 Arab-Israeli War.

He decided to travel to Palestine in 1947 via England and Egypt, to chronicle the war. Traveling with his camera, and using his birth name, he documented what he saw and the material for this adventure became his book Cairo to Damascus, published in 1951.

During his investigation, Carlson covered, not just the original subject, but many other aspects of the war. Throughout the war, Carlson didn't travel with the Western journalists. He traveled with Arabs, posing as an anti-Semitic, pro-Nazi, pro-Arab sympathizer in order to win their confidences. In general, everywhere he visited in the Arab world, Carlson presented extreme anti-Jewish views, whereby he could hear from his conversation partners, be it Arab civilians and military men, Nazi-German mercenaries or the Grand Mufti's Bosnian volunteers, their extreme views and their aspiration to put an end to Jewish existence in Palestine. He travelled between the two sides, crossing the hot zone in the midst of armed conflict, while in the Jewish side of Jerusalem, he identified himself with his true identity, as the writer of Under Cover.

In January 1948, Carlson arrived in London, where he presented himself as Charles L. Morey, "sales manager of the Homestead Farm Appliance Corporation, with offices and plant in St. John, Indiana" - an identity he had used already in 1945, in his correspondence with "every British hate-monger and anti-democrat" he read or heard about. In London he met with British Fascists who supported Oswald Mosley as well as mercenaries that were about to join the Arabs and fight alongside them.

Carlson left London and reached Cairo on March 2, 1948. When he tried to take photographs in the city, he was detained by the police under the suspicion of being a Jewish spy. On their way to the police station, Carlson and the two policemen were followed by a crowd yelling "Jew!". When Carlson turned around and shouted "I am an American!", he was yelled back: "Then you are worse than a Jew!". In Cairo he met with members of the Muslim Brotherhood and got them to talk about their hatred towards Jews.

On April 1, 1948, Carlson left Cairo accompanying the Egyptian "Green Shirts" volunteers as a photographer. They entered Palestine through Rafah. Not far from Be'er Sheba, Carlson saw for the first time a Jewish communal settlement – Kibbutz Beit Eshel - "contrasted sharply with the squalor of Arab villages". Through Hebron, the men reached Jerusalem. Carlson accompanied the Arab fighters, moving between different points of conflict. On April 13, 1948, the Hadassah medical convoy massacre took place, after which Carlson says the Arabs claimed "they had been falsely informed of large concentrations of Jewish bands gathering near the Hospital and University." When asked who had informed them, the Arabs of Aboutor answered: "The English!".

Carlson went with his friends back to Egypt in order to purchase more weapons. On their way they passed very near Kfar Etzion, where he witnessed a battle between the Arab Legion and the Jewish Kibbutz. On their way back from Egypt to Palestine, the volunteer fighters' truck drove near the ruins of Kibbutz Kfar Darom, towards Gaza City. On the beach, a member of the city council said to Carlson: "See that water? One month from now it will be black as far as the horizon with the nude bodies of floating Jews." Carlson and his friends proceeded to Jerusalem, during a wave of Arab defeats all over the country. In his book, Carlson is referring to the Arab exodus that followed those defeats: "This flight-psychosis, which prevailed among the Arabs ... is a difficult phenomenon to explain. It was a mass hysteria induced by poor morale and by fear of revenge and retribution for the Arab massacres and lootings from 1920 on."

Carlson claims the Arab Legion was seen in Gaza, Hebron and Jerusalem, while the British formally stated that "all units of the Arab Legion had left Palestine for Trans-Jordan prior to the end of the Mandate". On the night of the May 14 - the night before the Israeli declaration of independence, Carlson saw Gush Etzion burning down. His good friend Moustafa told him that night: "Every Arab knows that we will be in Tel Aviv one month from tomorrow. We will sit in the cafes by the sea, drink coffee...eat baklawa and enjoy the Jewish girls!"

Carlson decided to cross to the Jewish part of Jerusalem, so he could "be with the Jews on the first day of the new Jewish State". Holding a small American flag he crossed just in time to cover the departure of Alan Cunningham, the High Commissioner for Palestine and Transjordan. He experienced the siege of the Jewish part of Jerusalem from within, and depicted the inhabitants' hardships, shortage, hunger, continuous bombardment and grief over the dead.

Carlson went back and forth between the Jewish and the Arab sides. He met Abdullah el-Tall, the commander of the Arab Legion in Jerusalem, and under his protection he witnessed the fall of the Jewish Quarter of Jerusalem and the evacuation of its Jewish inhabitants on May 28, 1948, after a siege that lasted six months. He also took the chance to take a photograph of King Abdullah I of Jordan when he came to Jerusalem just after the Jewish surrender.

Carlson then visited Bethlehem, Jericho, Amman and Damascus, where he met with pro-Nazi Arab circles who admired the German Führer, and introduced him to a German Nazi with whom he raised a glass and toasted "Heil Hitler". In Damascus, Carlson managed to be accepted for a short interview with Haj Amin al-Husseini. Carlson's last visit in the Arab side of the conflict was to Beirut, the capital of Lebanon, which astonished him with its modernity in comparison to the simplicity of Amman and Damascus. In Beirut, he met with Christians who were aspiring to democracy and some of them even dared to express pro-Zionist views. His attempt to interview Fawzi al-Qawuqji failed, when Qawuqji decided to leave angrily after being asked about his lies about his victories and his sojourn in Germany.

Carlson's journey amongst the Arabs ended when, through Nicosia, he reached Haifa on a ship along with 280 Jewish displaced persons, Holocaust survivors from the Cyprus internment camps. He made a comprehensive tour in Israel, by his own, without any official guidance, a tour that affected him deeply and brought a comparison between the national revival of the Jewish People and a possible such revival of the Armenians:

Israel proved, too, a sentimental homeland for me. For two thousand years the Jews had dreamed of independence; for a thousand years the Armenians have dreamed of a sovereign, democratic homeland, to which one might come and go freely. I thrilled vicariously at the good fortune of Israel. Had not the Armenians suffered under the Turks, though to a lesser degree, as the Jews under Hitler? How similar the tortured background of these two ancient peoples, how common their yearning for liberty ... How natural, then, for one of Armenian birth to find inspiration in Israel! As I moved and dreamed from one end of Israel to the other, in my mind's eye I found myself substituting Armenian for Hebrew characters in the alphabet. I saw an Armenian democracy; I read Armenian newspapers. I saw Armenians creatively at work, consumed with the energy of a liberated people. I saw Armenia being rebuilt".

On his way back from Israel in November 1948, Carlson visited his birthplace, Alexandropolis, Greece. At the end of his journey he flew from Athens back to the United States.

In 1952, the book was translated to Hebrew by journalist Shalom Rosenfeld and published by the Ahiasaf Publishing House (הוצאה לאור אחיאסף) of Jerusalem.

== Bibliography ==
- Under Cover. New York: E. P. Dutton. 1943.
- The Plotters. New York: E. P. Dutton. 1946.
- Cairo to Damascus. New York: Alfred Knopf. 1951.

== See also ==
- Florence Mendheim - for a similar but less well-known undercover investigation of the Friends of the New Germany and the German American Bund.
- Hovhannes Kajaznuni
