= Julius Mendheim =

German chess player (c.1788–1836)

Julius Mendheim (c. 1788 – 25 August 1836) was a German chess master and problemist.

Not much is known about Mendheim's life. By profession, he was probably a merchant.

He was the first famous Berlin chess master and a member of the Berliner Schachgesellschaft (founded 1827). Earlier, he was a regular guest at the Old Club of Berlin (which existed from 1803 to 1847), but not a regular member there, despite having the reputation of being the best Berlin player. The young Ludwig Bledow, forthcoming co-founder of the Berlin Pleiades, lost the majority of the games he played with his older mentor. Mendheim seemingly inspired Bledow and the forming of the Pleiades, but he died before the group was firmly established.

Mendheim's strength can be seen from the fact that he single-handedly conducted the correspondence games that Berlin played against other cities (Breslau 1829–1833, Hamburg 1833–1836).

He was an author of Taschenbuch für Schachfreunde (Berlin, published by Alexander Mosar, 1814) and Aufgaben für Schachspieler (Berlin, published by Traugott Trautwein, 1832). He gets some mention in the Handbuch des Schachspiels section on problem composers.
