= Human–computer chess matches =

This article documents the progress of significant human–computer chess matches.

Chess computers were first able to beat strong chess players in the late 1980s. Their most famous success was the victory of Deep Blue over then World Chess Champion Garry Kasparov in 1997, but there was some controversy over whether the match conditions favored the computer.

In 2002–2003, three human–computer matches were drawn, but, whereas Deep Blue was a specialized machine, these were chess programs running on commercially available computers.

Chess programs running on commercially available desktop computers won decisive victories against human players in matches in 2005 and 2006. The second of these, against then world champion Vladimir Kramnik, is the last major human–computer match.

Since that time, chess programs running on commercial hardware—more recently including mobile phones—have been able to defeat even the strongest human players.

== El Ajedrecista (1913-1951) ==
Spanish automaton El Ajedrecista was an electromechanical analog computer able to execute a rook-and-king endgame to an inescapable victory result for the machine. Humans were unable to defeat it or even draw against it, though this was as much a function of the baked-in material disadvantage as it was a merit of the simple, flawless algorithm. In 1951 it played and checkmated Savielly Tartakower at a cybernetics conference in Paris.

== MANIAC (1956) ==
In 1956 MANIAC, developed at Los Alamos Scientific Laboratory, became the first computer to defeat a human in a reasonably complete chess-like game. Playing with the simplified Los Alamos rules, it defeated a novice in 23 moves.

== Mac Hack VI (1966–1968) ==
In 1966 MIT student Richard Greenblatt wrote the chess program Mac Hack VI using MIDAS macro assembly language on a Digital Equipment Corporation PDP-6 computer with 16K of memory. Mac Hack VI evaluated 10 positions per second.

In 1967, several MIT students and professors (organized by Seymour Papert) challenged Dr. Hubert Dreyfus to play a game of chess against Mac Hack VI. Dreyfus, a professor of philosophy at MIT, wrote the book What Computers Can’t Do, questioning the computer's ability to serve as a model for the human brain. He also asserted that no computer program could defeat even a 10-year-old child at chess. Dreyfus accepted the challenge. Herbert A. Simon, an artificial intelligence pioneer, watched the game. He said, "it was a wonderful game—a real cliffhanger between two woodpushers with bursts of insights and fiendish plans ... great moments of drama and disaster that go in such games." The computer was beating Dreyfus when he found a move which could have captured the enemy queen. The only way the computer could get out of this was to keep Dreyfus in checks with its own queen until it could fork the queen and king, and then exchange them. That is what the computer did. Soon, Dreyfus was losing. Finally, the computer checkmated Dreyfus in the middle of the board.

In the spring of 1967, Mac Hack VI played in the Boston Amateur championship, winning two games and drawing two games. Mac Hack VI beat a 1510 rated (Note: All ratings, unless otherwise stated, for the early periods (up to about 1990), are USCF Elo ratings since most of the early matches took place in the United States against low-rated players that would not have had an International rating. These are not directly comparable to FIDE Elo ratings as they are strictly different lists. USCF ratings are generally considered to be about 100 points higher than an equivalent FIDE rating.) United States Chess Federation player. This was the first time a computer won a game in a human tournament. Analysing the game, Bobby Fischer described the human's play as being “a disgrace to the human race.” At the end of 1968, Mac Hack VI achieved a rating of 1529. The average rating in the USCF was near 1500.

== Chess x.x (1968–1980) ==
In 1968, Northwestern University students Larry Atkin, David Slate and Keith Gorlen began work on Chess (Northwestern University). On 14 April 1970 an exhibition game was played against Australian Champion Fred Flatow, the program running on a Control Data Corporation 6600 model. Flatow won easily. On 25 July 1976, Chess 4.5 scored 5–0 in the Class B (1600–1799) section of the 4th Paul Masson chess tournament in Saratoga, California. This was the first time a computer won a human tournament. Chess 4.5 was rated 1722. Chess 4.5 running on a Control Data Corporation CDC Cyber 175 supercomputer (2.1 megaFLOPS) looked at fewer than 1500 positions per second. On 20 February 1977, Chess 4.5 won the 84th Minnesota Open Championship with 5 wins and 1 loss. It defeated expert Charles Fenner rated 2016. On 30 April 1978, Chess 4.6 scored 5–0 at the Twin Cities Open in Minneapolis. Chess 4.6 was rated 2040. International Master Edward Lasker stated that year, "My contention that computers cannot play like a master, I retract. They play absolutely alarmingly. I know, because I have lost games to 4.7."

On 4 September 1978, International Master David Levy (FIDE Elo 2320) defeated Chess 4.7 (the strongest computer at the time) in a six-game match by a score of 3½–1½, winning a famous bet made in 1968 that no chess computer would be able to beat him within ten years.

On 7 February 1979, Chess 4.8 drew an exhibition game against David Levy in Hamburg.

On 19 August 1980, Chess 4.9 drew a two-game match against expert player Paul Benjamin (rated 2050), losing the first game and winning the second.

== Belle (1980-1983) ==
In 1980, Belle defeated expert Jack Gibson (rated 2050) in a two-game match by a score of 1½ to ½.

In August 1981, Belle lost both games in a two-game match against Canadian Master Carl Storey (rated 2204) held at the University of British Columbia for the International Joint Conference on Artificial Intelligence.

On 5 March 1982, Grandmaster J. H. Donner (FIDE Elo 2460) defeated Belle in an exhibition game at the Technische Hogeschool Delft.

In the 1983 U.S. Open tournament, Belle scored 8½ out of 12 with a performance rating of 2363.

== Cray Blitz (1981-1984) ==
In 1981, Cray Blitz scored 5–0 in the Mississippi State Championship. In round 4, it defeated Joe Sentef (2262) to become the first computer to gain a master rating (2258) and only the third computer to beat a chess master in tournament play, after previous reported wins by "BELLE of Bell Laboratories" and "Control Data Corporation's CHESS 4.9".

In April 1984, David Levy defeated Cray Blitz, which was then the World Computer Chess Champion, by a score of 4 to 0 in a match held in London during the Advances in Computer Chess conference.

== Fredkin Incentive Match (1982) ==
From 15 to 17 August 1982, a team chess match between the four best computer programs in the world and four local chess experts was held at Carnegie Mellon University. The match was sponsored by the Fredkin Prize Fund. The computer team consisted of Nuchess, Cray Blitz, Belle and Duchess. The human team were Paul Resnick (1995), Ron Zaffuto (1998), Michael Goodside (2050) and Tom Martinak (2097). The human team won 10 to 6.

#	White	Black	Result	Outcome
1	Cray Blitz	Martinak	0–1	Human win
2	Goodside	Belle	1–0	Human win
3	Zaffuto	Nuchess	1–0	Human win
4	Duchess	Resnick	½–½	Draw
5	Martinak	Nuchess	1–0	Human win
6	Duchess	Goodside	0–1	Human win
7	Belle	Zaffuto	1–0	Computer win
8	Resnick	Cray Blitz	½–½	Draw
9	Belle	Martinak	0–1	Human win
10	Goodside	Cray Blitz	1–0	Human win
11	Zaffuto	Duchess	1–0	Human win
12	Nuchess	Resnick	1–0	Computer win
13	Martinak	Duchess	½–½	Draw
14	Nuchess	Goodside	1–0	Computer win
15	Cray Blitz	Zaffuto	1–0	Computer win
16	Resnick	Belle	½–½	Draw

== Nuchess (1984) ==
On 9 April 1984, Grandmaster Viktor Korchnoi (FIDE Elo 2635) defeated Nuchess, running on a Cray-1, in an exhibition game in Delft.

== Kasparov vs 32 computers simul (1985) ==
On 6 June 1985, Grandmaster and World Championship challenger Garry Kasparov (FIDE Elo 2715) played 32 chess computers in a simultaneous exhibition in Hamburg. The computer participants were various models from the Mephisto, Elite, Fidelity, Novag Constellation, SciSys Turbostar and Superstar lines. Kasparov won 32 to 0, winning every game.

== HiTech (1985-1988) ==
In 1985, HiTech scored 5½ out of 8 at the Fredkin Masters Invitational Tournament, placing third with a performance rating of 2443, against the strongest chess masters in Pittsburgh. Notably, it defeated Tom Martinak, who was the top scorer on the human team from the Fredkin Incentive Match three years earlier.

On 18 June 1986, HiTech defeated Woman Grandmaster Jana Miles (FIDE Elo 2235) in a two-game match, winning both games. On 23 February 1987, HiTech defeated FIDE Master and Under-14 World Champion Joël Lautier (FIDE Elo 2255) in a two-game match, winning both games. In August 1987, HiTech won the Pennsylvania State Chess Championship on tie-break, scoring 4½ out of 5 with a performance rating of 2559. In the tournament HiTech defeated Senior Master Allan Savage (2412).

In February 1988, HiTech defeated Malkiel Peretz (FIDE Elo 2345) in a two-game match by a score of 1½ to ½ and drew a two-game match in June against Manuel Apicella (FIDE Elo 2355), with both sides winning their game with white. In July 1988, HiTech won the Pennsylvania State Chess Championship with a score of 4½–½. HiTech defeated International Master Ed Formanek (2485). In September 1988, HiTech defeated Grandmaster Arnold Denker (FIDE Elo 2300) in a four-game match held at the New School for Social Research by a score of 3½–½.

== The Aegon Man–Machine Tournaments (1986–1997) ==
The 12 Aegon Man–Machine Tournaments were held annually from 1986 to 1997. The Dutch Computer Chess Federation (CSVN) organized the Aegon Man–Machine Tournaments in The Hague, Netherlands. The Aegon insurance company hosted the tournaments. An equal number of humans and computers played a 6-round swiss tournament with all games between humans and computers. The early tournaments were mostly local players and anti-computer tactics specialists. Later tournaments included masters and grandmasters. In the early tournaments, humans won more games. In the later tournaments, computers won more games.

100 players played in the 1997 tournament. Computers won 151½ points. Humans won 148½ points. Yona Kosashvili scored highest for the humans at 6 points out of 6 games. Kallisto scored highest for the computers at 4½ points.

Year	Players	Rounds	Human points	Computer points	Winner	Points	Best program	Points	Rank
1986	2 × 11	7			Fred van der Vliet	6	Rebel	4½	5
1987	2 × 13	6			Martin Voorn	6	Mephisto Dallas 16 bit	4½	3
1988	2 × 16	6			Lex Jongsma	6	Mephisto Mega 4	4	7
1989	2 × 16	6	57½	23	Ad van den Berg	5	Chess Challenger	3½	8
1990	2 × 14	6	47	37	HiTech	5	HiTech	5	1
1991	2 × 20	6			John van der Wiel	6	MChess	4	8
1992	2 × 24	6	84	60	David Bronstein	6	Mephisto 68030	4	8
1993	2 × 32	6			David Bronstein	5½	The King	5	3
1994	2 × 38	6	114	114	Larry Christiansen	5½	Gideon	4½	5
1995	2 × 48	6	132	155	John van der Wiel	5½	Hiarcs	5	2
1996	2 × 50	6	137½	162½	Yasser Seirawan	6	Quest	4½	5
1997	2 × 50	6	148½	151½	Yona Kosashvili	6	Kallisto	4½	4

== Deep Thought (1988-1990) ==
In May 1988, Deep Thought scored 4½ out of 6 in the Fredkin Masters Open with a performance rating of 2571, while its predecessor ChipTest scored 4 out of 6 with a performance rating of 2506. Both defeated Vivek Rao (2491) who was the only human to win against HiTech in the previous Fredkin event.

In November 1988, Deep Thought scored 6½ out of 8 in the Software Toolworks Championship, sharing first place with Tony Miles ahead of former world champion Mikhail Tal and several grandmasters, including Samuel Reshevsky, Walter Browne, and Mikhail Gurevich. It also defeated grandmaster Bent Larsen, making it the first computer to beat a grandmaster in a tournament. It's performance rating was 2745 (USCF scale).

In June 1989, Deep Thought drew a two-game match against International Master Olivier Renet (FIDE Elo 2480) in Royan. On 23 August 1989, Deep Thought defeated Grandmaster Robert Byrne (FIDE Elo 2465) in an exhibition game. Byrne won a return game played on 2 September 1989.

In December 1989, David Levy was finally defeated by a computer, losing 4-0 to Deep Thought in an exhibition match held at the British Computer Society headquarters in London.

However, Deep Thought was still considerably below World Championship Level, as the then reigning world chess champion Garry Kasparov (FIDE Elo 2775) demonstrated by convincingly winning both games in a two-game match on 22 October 1989.

On 22 November 1989, Deep Thought defeated Grandmaster Tony Miles (FIDE Elo 2570) in an exhibition game.

On 2 February 1990, Grandmaster and former world champion Anatoly Karpov (FIDE Elo 2730) defeated Deep Thought in an exhibition game at Harvard University.

In 1990, Deep Thought drew a two-game match against Grandmaster Helmut Pfleger (FIDE Elo 2505) in Munich. Both games were drawn.

== Netherlands vs Computers (1989) ==
On 9 April 1989, a team chess match between twelve of the best chess programs in the world and twelve Dutch chess masters was held in Hilversum. The computer team was headed by ChipTest, HiTech, Cray Blitz (the World Computer Chess Champion), and Belle. Deep Thought was unable to participate since it was undergoing modifications. The human team was fielded from the participants of the 1989 Dutch Chess Championship and included John van der Wiel, Jeroen Piket, Paul van der Sterren and Rudy Douven (the Dutch Chess Champion). Mikhail Botvinnik predicted a 6-6 result. The human team won 8½ to 3½.

#	White	Black	Result	Outcome
1	ChipTest	John van der Wiel (2560)	0–1	Human win
2	Jeroen Piket (2500)	HiTech	½–½	Draw
3	Cray Blitz	Paul van der Sterren (2500)	1–0	Computer win
4	Rini Kuijf (2485)	Mach IV +	1–0	Human win
5	Mephisto Almeria Turbo	Rudy Douven (2445)	0–1	Human win
6	Friso Nijboer (2445)	Bebe	1–0	Human win
7	Lachex	Joris Brenninkmeijer (2415)	0–1	Human win
8	Jeroen Vanheste (2410)	Phoenix	1–0	Human win
9	Belle	Frans Cuijpers (2405)	0–1	Human win
10	Peter Gelpke (2395)	Quest	0–1	Computer win
11	Mephisto Hilversum	Kick Langeweg (2365)	0–1	Human win
12	Albert Blees (2345)	Mach IV	0–1	Computer win

== Harvard Cup (1989–1995) ==
The Harvard Cup Human versus Computer Chess Challenge was organized by Harvard University. There were six challenges from 1989 until 1995. They played in Boston and New York City. In each challenge the humans scored higher and the highest scorer was a human.

Year	Men–computer	Human points	Computer points	Winner	Points	Best program	Points	Rank
1989	4–4	13½	2½	Boris Gulko, Michael Rohde	4	Deep Thought	1	5
1991	4–4	12	4	Maxim Dlugy	3½	Heuristic Alpha	2	5
1992	5–5	18	7	Michael Rohde	5	Socrates	3	3
1993	6–6	27	9	Joel Benjamin	5	Socrates	3	6
1994	6–8	29½	18½	Joel Benjamin	6½	WChess	5	4
1995	6–6	23½	12½	Joel Benjamin	4½	Virtual Chess	3½	4

== Chess Genius (1994) ==
The "Chess Genius" program was entered into a Professional Chess Association rapid chess tournament in 1994. It defeated and eliminated world champion Kasparov, but lost to Viswanathan Anand in the next round. This was the first time a computer had defeated the world champion in an official game, albeit at rapid time controls.

== Kasparov–Deep Blue (1996–1997) ==
=== 1996 ===
Deep Blue–Kasparov 1996, game 1

Position: h7 white rook, f6 black queen, h6 black king, d5 white queen, g5 white knight, d4 black pawn, a3 white pawn, b3 white pawn, f3 black pawn, g3 white pawn, h3 white pawn, f2 black knight, h2 white king, e1 black rook

Final position

Kasparov played a six-game match against IBM's Deep Blue in 1996. Kasparov lost the first game (Deep Blue–Kasparov, 1996, Game 1), the first time a reigning world champion had lost to a computer using regular time controls. However, Kasparov regrouped to win three and draw two of the remaining five games of the match, for a convincing 4–2 match victory.

=== 1997 ===
In May 1997, an updated version of Deep Blue defeated Kasparov 3½–2½ in a highly publicized six-game match. Kasparov won the first, lost the second, and drew the next three. The match was even after five games but Kasparov was crushed in Game 6. This was the first time a computer had ever defeated a world champion in match play. A documentary film was made about this famous match-up entitled Game Over: Kasparov and the Machine. In that film Kasparov casually says, "I have to tell you that, you know, game two was not just a single loss of a game. It was a loss of the match, because I couldn't recover."

In game 6, Kasparov blundered very early into the game. Kasparov cites tiredness and unhappiness with the IBM team's conduct at the time as the main reason.

Kasparov claimed that several factors weighed against him in this match. In particular, he was denied access to Deep Blue's recent games, in contrast to the computer's team that could study hundreds of Kasparov's.

After the loss, Kasparov said that he sometimes saw deep intelligence and creativity in the machine's moves, suggesting that during the second game, human chess players, in contravention of the rules, intervened. IBM denied that it cheated, saying the only human intervention occurred between games. The rules provided for the developers to modify the program between games, an opportunity they said they used to shore up weaknesses in the computer's play revealed during the course of the match. Kasparov requested printouts of the machine's log files but IBM refused, although the company later published the logs on the Internet. Kasparov demanded a rematch, but IBM refused and dismantled Deep Blue.

Kasparov maintains that he was told the match was to be a scientific project but that it soon became apparent that IBM wanted only to beat him for the company's advertisement.

== Anand–REBEL (1998) ==
With increasing processing power, Chess programs running on regular workstations began to rival top flight players. In 1998, Rebel 10 defeated Viswanathan Anand who, at the time, was ranked second in the world, by a score of 5–3. However, most of those games were not played under normal time controls. Out of the eight games, four were blitz games (five minutes plus five seconds Fischer delay (see time control) for each move); these Rebel won 3–1. Then two were semi-blitz games (fifteen minutes for each side) which Rebel won as well (1½–½). Finally, two games were played as regular tournament games (forty moves in two hours, one hour sudden death); here, it was Anand who won ½–1½. At least in fast games, computers played better than humans, but under classical time controls—at which a player's rating is determined—the advantage was not so clear.

== Deep Junior at Dortmund (2000) ==
Deep Junior played 9 grandmasters at the Sparkassen Chess Meeting in Dortmund, Germany from 6 to 17 July 2000. The 2000 Sparkassen Chess Meeting was a category 19 chess tournament. Computer program Deep Junior competed in a round robin format. Deep Junior scored 4½ in 9 rounds. Deep Junior performed at a rating of 2703.

Round	White	Elo	Black	Elo	Result	Moves	ECO
1	Bareev, E	2702	Deep Junior		½–½	146	D46
2	Deep Junior		Huebner, R	2615	1–0	39	C04
3	Adams, M	2755	Deep Junior		½–½	84	C68
4	Deep Junior		Khalifman, A	2667	½–½	129	B08
5	Kramnik, V	2770	Deep Junior		1–0	65	D00
6	Deep Junior		Akopian, V	2660	½–½	89	B00
7	Anand, V	2762	Deep Junior		½–½	35	D05
8	Deep Junior		Piket, J	2649	0–1	68	B15
9	Leko, P	2740	Deep Junior		0–1	120	C48

== Kramnik–Deep Fritz (2002) ==
In October 2002, Vladimir Kramnik (who had succeeded Kasparov as Classical World Chess Champion) and Deep Fritz competed in the eight-game Brains in Bahrain match, which ended in a 4–4 draw.

Kramnik was given several advantages in his match against Fritz when compared to most other human–computer matches, such as the one Kasparov lost against Deep Blue in 1997. The code of Fritz was frozen some time before the first match, and Kramnik was given a copy of Fritz to practice with for several months. Another difference was that in games lasting more than 56 moves, Kramnik was allowed to adjourn until the following day, during which time he could use his copy of Fritz to aid him in his overnight analysis of the position.

Kramnik won games 2 and 3 by "conventional" anti-computer tactics—play conservatively for a long-term advantage the computer is not able to see in its game tree search. Fritz, however, won game 5 after a severe blunder by Kramnik. Game 6 was described by the tournament commentators as "spectacular". Kramnik, in a better position in the early middlegame, tried a piece sacrifice to achieve a strong tactical attack, a strategy known to be highly risky against computers, who are at their strongest defending against such attacks. True to form, Fritz found a watertight defense, and Kramnik's attack petered out, leaving him in a bad position. Kramnik resigned the game, believing the position lost. However, post-game human and computer analysis has shown that the Fritz program was unlikely to have been able to force a win, and Kramnik effectively sacrificed a drawn position. The final two games were draws. Given the circumstances, most commentators still rate Kramnik the stronger player in the match.

== Kasparov–Deep Junior (2003) ==
In January 2003, Kasparov engaged in a six-game classical time control match with a $1 million prize fund which was billed as the FIDE "Man vs. Machine" World Championship, against Deep Junior. The engine evaluated three million positions per second. After one win each and three draws, it was all up to the final game. The final game of the match was televised on ESPN2 and was watched by an estimated 200–300 million people. After reaching a decent position Kasparov offered a draw, which was soon accepted by the Deep Junior team. Asked why he offered the draw, Kasparov said he feared making a blunder. Originally planned as an annual event, the match was not repeated.

== Kasparov–X3D Fritz (2003) ==
In November 2003, Kasparov engaged in a four-game match against the computer program X3D Fritz (which was said to have an estimated rating of 2807), using a virtual board, 3D glasses and a speech recognition system. After two draws and one win apiece, the X3D Man–Machine match ended in a draw. Kasparov received $175,000 for the result and took home the golden trophy. Kasparov continued to criticize the blunder in the second game that cost him a crucial point. He felt that he had outplayed the machine overall and played well. "I only made one mistake but unfortunately that one mistake lost the game."

== Man vs Machine World Team Championship (2004–2005) ==
The Man vs Machine World Team Championships were two chess tournaments in Bilbao, Spain, between leading chess grandmasters and chess computers. Both were convincingly won by the computers. A second name for the tournaments is Human vs. Computers World Team Matches.

=== 2004 ===
In October 2004, Ruslan Ponomariov (then having Elo 2710), Veselin Topalov (Elo 2757) and Sergey Karjakin (Elo 2576) played against computers Hydra, Fritz 8, and Deep Junior. Ponomariov and Topalov were FIDE world chess champions. Sergey Karjakin at 12 was the youngest Grandmaster. Hydra was running on a special machine with 16 processors located in Abu Dhabi, UAE; Deep Junior, the then reigning computer chess world champion, used a remote 4 × 2.8 GHz Xeon machine located at Intel UK (Swindon); and Fritz 8 was running on a Centrino 1.7 GHz notebook. The computers won 8½ to 3½. The humans won one game: Karjakin, the youngest and lowest rated player, defeated Deep Junior.

#	White	Black	Result	Outcome
1	Ponomariov	Hydra	0–1	Computer win
2	Fritz	Karjakin	1–0	Computer win
3	Deep Junior	Topalov	½–½	Draw
4	Karjakin	Deep Junior	1–0	Human win
5	Ponomariov	Fritz	½–½	Draw
6	Topalov	Hydra	½–½	Draw
7	Deep Junior	Ponomariov	½–½	Draw
8	Hydra	Karjakin	1–0	Computer win
9	Fritz	Topalov	1–0	Computer win
10	Hydra	Ponomariov	1–0	Computer win
11	Karjakin	Fritz	0–1	Computer win
12	Topalov	Deep Junior	½–½	Draw

=== 2005 ===
In November 2005, 3 former FIDE world chess champions—Alexander Khalifman, Ruslan Ponomariov and Rustam Kasimdzhanov—played against computers Hydra, Junior and Fritz. The computers won 8 to 4. The Ponomariov vs Fritz game on 21 November 2005 is the last known win by a human against a top-performing computer under normal chess tournament conditions.

#	White	Black	Result	Outcome
1	Ponomariov	Junior	0–1	Computer win
2	Hydra	Kasimdzhanov	1–0	Computer win
3	Fritz	Khalifman	1–0	Computer win
4	Ponomariov	Fritz	1–0	Human win
5	Kasimdzhanov	Junior	½–½	Draw
6	Khalifman	Hydra	½–½	Draw
7	Hydra	Ponomariov	1–0	Computer win
8	Fritz	Kasimdzhanov	½–½	Draw
9	Junior	Khalifman	1–0	Computer win
10	Ponomariov	Junior	½–½	Draw
11	Kasimdzhanov	Hydra	½–½	Draw
12	Khalifman	Fritz	½–½	Draw

== Hydra–Adams (2005) ==
In 2005, Hydra, a dedicated chess computer with custom hardware and sixty-four processors and also winner of the 14th IPCCC in 2005, crushed seventh-ranked Michael Adams 5½–½ in a six-game match. While Adams was criticized for not preparing as well as Kasparov and Kramnik had, some commentators saw this as heralding the end of human–computer matches.

== Kramnik–Deep Fritz (2006) ==
Kramnik, then still the World Champion, played a six-game match against the computer program Deep Fritz in Bonn, Germany from 25 November to 5 December 2006, losing 4–2 to the machine, with two losses and four draws. He received 500,000 euros for playing and would have received another 500,000 euros had he won the match. Deep Fritz version 10 ran on a computer containing two Intel Xeon CPUs (a Xeon DC 5160 3 GHz processor with a 1333 MHz FSB and a 4 MB L2 cache) and was able to evaluate eight million positions per second. Kramnik received a copy of the program in mid-October for testing, but the final version included an updated opening book. Except for limited updates to the opening book, the program was not allowed to be changed during the course of the match. The endgame tablebases used by the program were restricted to five pieces, even though a complete six-piece tablebase is widely available. While Deep Fritz was in its opening book, Kramnik is allowed to see Fritz's display. The Fritz display contains opening-book moves, number of games, Elo performance, score from grandmaster games and the move weighting.

In the first five games, Kramnik steered the game into a typical "anti-computer" positional contest. On 25 November, the first game ended in a draw at the 47th move. A number of commentators believe Kramnik missed a win. Two days later, the second game resulted in a victory for Deep Fritz, when Kramnik made what Susan Polgar called the "blunder of the century", when he failed to defend against a threatened mate-in-one in an even position. (See also Deep Fritz vs. Vladimir Kramnik blunder.) The third, fourth and fifth games in the match ended in draws.

In the final game, in an attempt to draw the match, Kramnik played the more aggressive Sicilian Defence and was crushed, losing the match 4–2.

There was speculation that interest in human–computer chess competition would plummet as a result of the 2006 Kramnik–Deep Fritz match. According to McGill University computer science professor Monty Newborn, for example, "I don’t know what one could get out of it [a further match] at this point. The science is done."

== Rybka odds matches (2007–2008) ==
Since 2007, Rybka has played some odds matches against grandmasters. Jaan Ehlvest first lost a pawn-odds match, then later lost a match when given time, color, opening, and endgame advantages. Roman Dzindzichashvili then lost a match when given pawn and move odds.

In September 2008, Rybka played an odds match against Vadim Milov, its strongest opponent yet in an odds match (Milov at the time had an Elo rating of 2705, 28th in the world). The result was a narrow victory to Milov—he had won 1½–½ when given pawn-and-move, and 2½–1½ (1 win, 3 draws) when given exchange odds but playing black. In two standard games (Milov had white, no odds), Rybka won 1½–½.

== Pocket Fritz 4 (2009) ==
In 2009, a chess engine running on slower hardware, a 528 MHz HTC Touch HD mobile phone, reached the grandmaster level. The mobile phone won a category 6 tournament with a performance rating of 2898. The chess engine Hiarcs 13 runs inside Pocket Fritz 4 on the mobile phone HTC Touch HD. Pocket Fritz 4 won the Copa Mercosur tournament in Buenos Aires, Argentina with 9 wins and 1 draw on 4–14 August 2009. Pocket Fritz 4 searches fewer than 20,000 positions per second, as explained by Tsukrov, the author of the Pocket Fritz GUI. This is in contrast to supercomputers such as Deep Blue that searched 200 million positions per second. Pocket Fritz 4 achieves a higher performance level than Deep Blue.

Pocket Fritz 3 using version 12.1 of Hiarcs won the same event the previous year with six wins and four draws, running on a 624 MHz HP iPAQ hx2790. The 2008 Mercosur Cup was a category 7 tournament. Pocket Fritz 3 achieved a performance rating of 2690.

== Komodo handicap matches (2015) ==
In 2015, a chess engine Komodo played a series of handicap matches with GM Petr Neuman. Neuman won the match.

== Komodo handicap matches (2020) ==
In 2020, chess engine Komodo played a series of handicap matches with Australian GM David Smerdon at knight odds. Smerdon won 5–1, in spite of most commentators who favored Komodo to win. In November 2020, Komodo trained by an NNUE reinforcement learning algorithm, played 8 15-minute games against top grandmaster Hikaru Nakamura given double-pawn odds. Nakamura lost the match, drawing 3, losing 5, and winning 0.
