= Dutch Open Computer Chess Championship =

Chess tournament for computer chess programs

The Dutch [open] computer chess championship was a chess tournament for computer chess programs held from 1981 to 2012. It was organised yearly by the CSVN (Computer Chess Association of the Netherlands) around October or November.

== Champions ==
#	Year	Program	Champion
1	1981	YNCT 1.0	Luuk de Vries
2	1982	Gambiet 82	Wim Rens
3	1983	Chess 0.5X	Wim Elsenaar
4	1984	Chess 0.5X	Wim Elsenaar
5	1985	Nona	Frans Morsch
6	1986	Nona	Frans Morsch
7	1987	REBEL	Ed Schröder
8	1988	Quest	Frans Morsch
9	1989	REBEL	Ed Schröder
10	1990	REBEL	Ed Schröder
11	1991	The King	Johan de Koning
12	1992	REBEL	Ed Schröder
13	1993	The King	Johan de Koning
14	1994	Quest	Frans Morsch
15	1995	The King	Johan de Koning
16	1996	CilkChess	MIT team
17	1997	Nimzo	Christian Donninger
18	1998	The King	Johan de Koning
19	1999	Quest	Frans Morsch, Mathias Feist
20	2000	Chess Tiger	Christophe Théron, Jeroen Noomen
21	2001	Chess Tiger	Christophe Théron, Jeroen Noomen
22	2002	Chess Tiger	Christophe Théron, Jeroen Noomen
23	2003	Ruffian	Perola Valfridsson, Martin Blume, Djordje Vidanovic
24	2004	Diep	Vincent Diepeveen
25	2005	Zappa	Anthony Cozzie, Erdogan Günes
26	2006	Rybka	Vasik Rajlich, Jeroen Noomen
27	2007	Rybka	Vasik Rajlich, Jeroen Noomen
28	2008	Rybka	Vasik Rajlich, Jeroen Noomen
29	2009	Rybka	Vasik Rajlich, Lukas Cimiotti (hardware), Jiří Dufek (opening book), Hans van der Zijden (operator)
30	2010	Rybka	Vasik Rajlich, Lukas Cimiotti (hardware), Jiří Dufek (opening book), Hans van der Zijden (operator)
31	2011	Pandix	Gyula Horváth
32	2012	Rybka	Vasik Rajlich
