= ChessGenius =

- Developers: Richard Lang, Adrian Millett
- Stable release: 7.2
- Operating system: Windows
- Type: Chess engine
- License: Proprietary
- Website: www.chessgenius.com

ChessGenius is a chess-playing computer program written by Richard Lang, who has in the past written programs that have won the World Computer Chess Championship on 10 occasions.

== History ==
ChessGenius is a continuation of a series of programs (which included various incarnations of the Mephisto program) written by Richard Lang which won the World Microcomputer Chess Championship in 1984, 1985, 1986, 1987, 1988, 1989, 1990, 1991 and 1993. ChessGenius was the first computer to beat a world champion (Garry Kasparov) at a non-blitz time limit. This victory was particularly significant because in contrast to the victory two years later by Deep Blue which was running on very fast custom-built hardware, ChessGenius was running on only an early Pentium PC.

| Release Name | Year | OS |
| ChessGenius 1 | 1992 | MS-DOS |
| ChessGenius 2 | 1993 | MS-DOS |
| ChessGenius 3 | 1994 | MS-DOS |
| ChessGenius 4 | 1995 | Windows |
| ChessGenius 5 | 1996 | Windows |
| ChessGenius 6 | 1998 | Windows |
| ChessGenius Classic (7.2) | 2002 | Windows |

== Features ==
As well as playing chess, ChessGenius can read games created in .cbf (Chess Base Format) and .pgn (Portable Game Notation) formats and can analyse games assessing the moves played against its own evaluations. It is also possible to run other chess engines in the ChessGenius interface. The built-in opening book for ChessGenius for Windows was written by a team led by Ossi Weiner.

== Playing strength ==
In the early 1990s ChessGenius was "one of the first master-strength programs". In an article comparing ChessGenius with Fritz in February 1994 Grandmaster and computer chess expert John Nunn wrote, "[m]y own opinion is that if raw playing strength is your dominant criterion, then go for Genius". Its playing style has been compared to that of a "micro-Karpov". ChessGenius, like many of Lang's programs, was famous for having an 'asymmetric evaluation function' which means that moves and sequences of moves might be scored differently depending on whether they are to be made by the program or by the opponent (which has implications for which lines are 'forward pruned' in its calculations). For example, ChessGenius might give a low score to a wild attack of its own and so not calculate it and so not initiate it, but a high score to a wild attack by the opponent and so spend time calculating the implications of such an attack by the opponent, thus making its style of play very 'safe'.
At the Intel World Chess Grand Prix in London in 1994 ChessGenius achieved a rating performance for the tournament of 2795 Elo rating. From 1994 until 1998 ChessGenius remained one of the top chess programs available. In 1999 ChessGenius dropped out of the top ten on the SSDF (Swedish Chess Computer Association) rating list and it continued to slip down the list over the following decade. The programmer Richard Lang has suggested that this was because the program does not scale well to faster hardware. Portable versions (for example for Palm and the original iPhone) perform exceptionally well because ChessGenius is particularly strong in weak hardware environments. Unlike most other commercial vendors, Richard Lang explicitly forbids including the PC version of ChessGenius in chess engine rating lists, so it is difficult to gauge its strength compared to other modern programs. The current PC version of ChessGenius (7.2) is marketed as "Classic" because it was the first platform on which the ChessGenius engine appeared. This distinguishes it from the other versions primarily for handheld devices. It has been suggested that this branding (as "Classic") is also because apart from speed and efficiency enhancements, and updates to its openings book, the program has not changed dramatically since 1995.

== Famous game ==
Game animation

Kasparov vs. ChessGenius, 1994

Position: a7 black pawn, b6 black pawn, d6 white knight, f6 black pawn, g6 black king, b5 white pawn, g5 black pawn, a4 white pawn, d4 white king, b3 black knight

Final position after 60...Nb3+

This is the famous game from 1994 in which ChessGenius, playing with the black pieces, defeated the then world champion Garry Kasparov. The game sees Kasparov rejecting clear drawing opportunities and eventually losing. ChessGenius plays fairly well despite making some anti-positional moves which Kasparov was unable to capitalize on.

White: Garry Kasparov Black: ChessGenius Opening: ECO D11
1. c4 c6 2. d4 d5 3. Nf3 Nf6 4. Qc2 dxc4 5. Qxc4 Bf5 6. Nc3 Nbd7 7. g3 e6 8. Bg2 Be7 9. O-O O-O 10. e3 Ne4 11. Qe2 Qb6 12. Rd1 Rad8 13. Ne1 Ndf6 14. Nxe4 Nxe4 15. f3 Nd6 16. a4 Qb3 17. e4 Bg6 18. Rd3 Qb4 19. b3 Nc8 20. Nc2 Qb6 21. Bf4 c5 22. Be3 cxd4 23. Nxd4 Bc5 24. Rad1 e5 25. Nc2 Rxd3 26. Qxd3 Ne7 27. b4 Bxe3+ 28. Qxe3 Rd8 29. Rxd8+ Qxd8 30. Bf1 b6 31. Qc3 f6 32. Bc4+ Bf7 33. Ne3 Qd4 34. Bxf7+ Kxf7 35. Qb3+ Kf8 36. Kg2 Qd2+ 37. Kh3 Qe2 38. Ng2 h5 39. Qe3 Qc4 40. Qd2 Qe6+ 41. g4 hxg4+ 42. fxg4 Qc4 43. Qe1 Qb3+ 44. Ne3 Qd3 45. Kg3 Qxe4 46. Qd2 Qf4+ 47. Kg2 Qd4 48. Qxd4 exd4 49. Nc4 Nc6 50. b5 Ne5 51. Nd6 d3 52. Kf2 Nxg4+ 53. Ke1 Nxh2 54. Kd2 Nf3+ 55. Kxd3 Ke7 56. Nf5+ Kf7 57. Ke4 Nd2+ 58. Kd5 g5 59. Nd6+ Kg6 60. Kd4 Nb3+ 0–1

== Other platforms ==
As well as PC versions of ChessGenius there are versions available for various mobile devices including mobile phones (such as the Apple iPhone and Android smartphones) and personal organisers.

Versions include the following: ChessGenius for Desktop PC's (Windows PC's, MS-DOS), Android, Windows® powered Smartphones (Windows Mobile, Windows Phone 8), iPhone, iPad & iPod touch, Pocket PC, Bada (Samsung), Palm Computing® Platform (Palm OS), Symbian Series 60 phones (Symbian S60 and ^3 phones), Nokia 7650 / 3650 Phone (any phone with Symbian Series 60 OS like Nokia N-Gage, Siemens SX1, etc.), UIQ phones, EPROMS, Casio BE-300 Pocket Manager, and more (especially phones).

== See also ==
- Chess engine
- Computer chess
- Human–computer chess matches
- List of chess software
- World Computer Chess Championship
