= Fruit (software) =

Chess engine software

- Original author: Fabien Letouzey
- Release: March 17, 2004; 22 years ago
- Final release: 2.3.1 / August 2, 2007; 19 years ago
- Type: Chess engine
- License: proprietary freeware (after v2.1); GNU General Public License (until v2.1)
- Website: www.fruitchess.com

Fruit is a chess engine developed by Fabien Letouzey. In the SSDF rating list released on November 24, 2006, Fruit version 2.2.1 had a rating of 2842. In the CEGT rating list released on January 24, 2007, Fruit version 2.2.1 had a rating of 2776.

== History ==
At the World Computer Chess Championship in Reykjavík in 2005, Fruit 2.2 scored 8.5 out of 11, finishing in second place behind Zappa.

Until Version 2.1 (Peach), Fruit was free and open-source software subject to the requirements of the GNU General Public License and as such contributed much to the development in computer chess in recent years. Some people still work on the v2.1 source code and have created variations from the original Fruit.

As of July 23, 2007, Fruit became freeware. Fruit 2.3.1 was one of the top 3 free UCI chess engines.

== Technical details of Fruit 2.1 ==
Fruit uses the classical Negascout (principal variation search) algorithm with iterative deepening to traverse the game tree. It also uses the null-move heuristic. The original version used a simplistic evaluation function with a robust search. Later versions have improved evaluation functions. The board representation is distinct — Fruit uses a 16x16 board.

== Derivatives ==
Although in 2007 Fabien Letouzey stopped the development of Fruit with version 2.3.1, the earlier open source 2.1 version provided the basis for many other programs.

=== Toga II ===
Toga II is a derivative created by Thomas Gaksch, currently continued by Jerry Donald Watson. It has more chess knowledge, multi-processor support, and perhaps a better search algorithm. It is based on Fruit 2.1 and is free. The strongest version is Toga II 4.0, released on 29 December 2017 by Jerry Donald Watson. Experimental versions of Toga II running on computer clusters have competed in the World Computer Chess Championship (WCCC). At about 80 ELO above Fruit 2.3.1, Toga II is the strongest Fruit derivative as of March 2014.

In 2008, forks of Toga II started to appear, like Grapefruit and Cyclone.

=== GambitFruit ===
GambitFruit is another free derivative of Fruit 2.1, created by Ryan Benitez. It plays a more aggressive style and has more chess knowledge. GambitFruit also incorporates improvements from Toga II. Development of GambitFruit stopped in 2005.

=== GNU Chess ===
GNU Chess 6.x is based on Fruit 2.1 and the project is since 2011 under active development.

=== Fruit Reloaded ===
Fruit Reloaded by Fabien Letouzey, Daniel Mehrmann and Ryan Benitez is an independent fork of Fruit 2.1 with a number of enhancements.

== Rybka controversy ==
In June 2011, a lengthy investigation by the International Computer Games Association (ICGA) determined Rybka was plagiarized from Fruit and Crafty. The author of Rybka, Vasik Rajlich, refused to address the allegations against Rybka with the ICGA, instead preferring an ex post facto public interview conducted by Nelson Hernandez on July 4, 2011. Rajlich had previously said: I went through the Fruit 2.1 source code forwards and backwards and took many things.

== Senpai ==
On the tenth anniversary of the start of Fruit development in 2014, Fabien Letouzey released a completely new engine, Senpai, under the GPLv3. Senpai makes use of chess engine developments made in the intervening decade. It differs from Fruit in using bitboards and C++11's thread support for SMP.

== See also ==
- REBEL (chess)
