= Vasik =

Vasik is both a given name and a surname. Vašík is a nickname for the Slavic male name Václav.

Notable people with the name include:

- Cassandra Vasik, Canadian country singer-songwriter
- Vasik Rajlich (born 1971), American chess player
