= MChess Pro =

- MChess Pro Screenshot
- Developer: Martin Hirsch
- Stable release: 8.0
- Operating system: MS-DOS
- Type: Chess engine
- License: Proprietary

MChess Pro is the name given to a chess playing computer program written by Marty Hirsch which won the World Microcomputer Chess Championship in 1995. The program is no longer under development and is no longer commercially available and therefore has largely historical significance only.

== History ==
The versions of MChess Pro which appear on the historical and current SSDF ratings lists include 3.12, 3.5, 4.0, 5.0, 6.0, 7.1, and 8.0.

== Features ==
MChess Pro has its own DOS GUI and as well as playing chess is able to analyse EPD (Extended Position Description) files. The opening book for the software is written by Sandro Necchi.

== Playing style ==
MChess Pro's style of play is designed to be particularly human, and, more specifically, particularly positional. MChess Pro uses 'complex pattern recognition', has an evaluation function designed to focus on positional factors, and uses aggressive variation pruning in its searches.

== Playing strength ==
MChess Pro was one of the strongest chess programs of the 1990s. MChess Pro finished 8th and was the highest placed computer in the 1991 AEGON Man-Machine tournament. In the 10th AEGON event at the Hague in 1995, MChess Pro defeated three grandmasters and achieved a performance rating of 2652 Elo. MChess Pro has defeated a number of very strong players including Christiansen, Z. Polgar, Rohde, Shabalov, Cifuentes and Wolff. By the end of the 1990s MChess Pro was slipping further down the SSDF (Swedish Chess Computer Association) rating lists and by 2001 was already outside the top 30 programs.

== Sample game ==
Game animation

This game from 1995 sees MChess Pro defeating one of the strongest female players of the 20th Century - Grandmaster Zsuzsa Polgar. Black suffers damage to her pawn structure early on and in the endgame allows an exchange of dark-squared bishops which leaves her king placed too passively. MChess Pro handles this endgame fairly well.

White: MChess Pro

Black: Zsuzsa Polgar

1.e4 c5 2.Nf3 Nc6 3.d4 cxd4 4.Nxd4 g6 5.Nc3 Bg7 6.Be3 Nf6 7.Bc4 O-O 8.Bb3 a5 9.f3 d5 10.Bxd5 Nxd5 11.Nxd5 f5 12.Nxc6 bxc6 13.Nb6 Rb8 14.Qxd8 Rxd8 15.Rd1 Rxd1+ 16.Kxd1 fxe4 17.Nxc8 Rxc8 18.b3 exf3 19.gxf3 a4 20.Re1 Ra8 21.Re2 Kf7 22.Bc5 e6 23.Rd2 Ke8 24.Ke2 Be5 25.Ke3 g5 26.Ke4 Bf4 27.Rg2 Kf7 28.h4 h6 29.Bb4 Rb8 30.Bc3 Ra8 31.Bd4 Ra5 32.hxg5 hxg5 33.Bc3 Ra8 34.Be5 axb3 35.cxb3 Bxe5 36.Kxe5 Ke7 37.a4 Rb8 38.Rxg5 Rxb3 39.Rg7+ Kd8 40.f4 Rb4 41.a5 Ra4 42.Kxe6 Re4+ 43.Kd6 Rd4+ 44.Kxc6 Rxf4 45.a6 Rc4+ 46.Kb5 Rc7 47.Rg8+ Kd7 48.a7 1-0

== See also ==
- Chess engine
- Computer chess
- Human–computer chess matches
- List of chess software
- World Computer Chess Championship
