= Swedish Chess Computer Association =

Organization that rates competitive computer chess software

The Swedish Chess Computer Association (Swedish: Svenska schackdatorföreningen, SSDF) is an organization that tests computer chess software by playing chess programs against one another and producing a rating list. On September 26, 2008, the list was released with Deep Rybka 3 leading with an estimated Elo rating of 3238. Rybka's listing in June 2006 was the first time a program on the list has passed the 2900 mark. In the year 2000 the ratings of the chess engines in the SSDF rating pool were calibrated with games played against humans.

The SSDF list is one of the only statistically significant measures of chess engine strength, especially compared to tournaments, because it incorporates the results of thousands of games played on standard hardware at tournament time controls. The list reports not only absolute rating, but also error bars, winning percentages, and recorded moves of played games.

The SSDF's current testing platform includes an AMD Ryzen 7 1800X 8-Core 3.6 GHz with 16 GB of RAM-memory and a 64-bit operating system. On this platform they have chosen to add the 6-piece Syzygy endgame database, installed on SSD, for the programs that are able to use it. From 1984 to 2020, the SSDF top program increased by 1942 points, an average of 54 points per year. The SSDF list was discontinued on December 31, 2023.

== Rating list year-end leaders ==
Rating list year-end leaders
Year	Program	Hardware	Rating
1984	Novag Super Constellation	6502 4 MHz	1631
1985	Mephisto Amsterdam	68000 12 MHz	1827
1986	Mephisto Amsterdam	68000 12 MHz	1827
1987	Mephisto Dallas	68020 14 MHz	1923
1988	Mephisto MM 4 Turbo Kit	6502 16 MHz	1993
1989	Mephisto Portorose	68020 12 MHz	2027
1990	Mephisto Portorose	68030 36 MHz	2138
1991	Mephisto Vancouver	68030 36 MHz	2127
1992	Chess Machine Schröder 3.0	ARM2 30 MHz	2174
1993	Mephisto Genius 2.0	486/50-66 MHz	2235
1995	MChess Pro 5.0	Pentium 90 MHz	2306
1996	Rebel 8.0	Pentium 90 MHz	2337
1997	HIARCS 6.0	49MB P200 MMX	2418
1998	Fritz 5.0 PB29%	67MB P200 MMX	2460
1999	Chess Tiger 12.0 DOS	128MB K6-2 450 MHz	2594
2000	Fritz 6.0	128MB K6-2 450 MHz	2607
2001	Chess Tiger 14.0 CB	256MB Athlon 1200	2709
2002	Deep Fritz 7.0	256MB Athlon 1200 MHz	2759
2003	Shredder 7.04 UCI	256MB Athlon 1200 MHz	2791
2004	Shredder 8.0 CB	256MB Athlon 1200 MHz	2800
2005	Shredder 9.0 UCI	256MB Athlon 1200 MHz	2808
2006	Rybka 1.2	256MB Athlon 1200 MHz	2902
2007	Rybka 2.3.1 Arena	256MB Athlon 1200 MHz	2935
2008	Deep Rybka 3	2GB Q6600 2.4 GHz	3238
2009	Deep Rybka 3	2GB Q6600 2.4 GHz	3232
2010	Deep Rybka 3	2GB Q6600 2.4 GHz	3227
2011	Deep Rybka 4	2GB Q6600 2.4 GHz	3216
2012	Deep Rybka 4 x64	2GB Q6600 2.4 GHz	3221
2013	Komodo 5.1 MP x64	2GB Q6600 2.4 GHz	3241
2014	Komodo 7.0 MP x64	2GB Q6600 2.4 GHz	3295
2015	Stockfish 6 MP x64	2GB Q6600 2.4 GHz	3334
2016	Komodo 9.1 MP x64	2GB Q6600 2.4 GHz	3366
2017	Komodo 11.01 MP x64	16GB 1800X 3.6 GHz	3406
2018	Stockfish 9 MP x64	16GB 1800X 3.6 GHz	3502
2019	Stockfish 10 MP x64	16GB 1800X 3.6 GHz	3529
2020	Stockfish 12 NNUE MP x64	16GB 1800X 3.6 GHz	3573
2021	Stockfish 13 MP x64	16GB 1800X 3.6 GHz	3578
2022	1 Lc0 0.26.3 Cuda(67362)	3060Ti	3581
2023	1 Lc0 0.26.3 Cuda(67362)	3060Ti	3586

== See also ==
- Chess engine rating lists
- Chess Engines Grand Tournament (CEGT)
