= SSDF =

SSDF can refer to:

- Swedish Chess Computer Association
- Somali Salvation Democratic Front
- South Sudan Defense Forces, a rival group to the Sudan People's Liberation Army
