= Robert Hyatt =

American computer scientist and programmer

- Born: Robert Morgan Hyatt; 1948 (age 77–78); Laurel, Mississippi, US
- Education: University of Southern Mississippi; University of Alabama at Birmingham
- Known for: Crafty, Cray Blitz
- Scientific career
- Fields: Computer science, programming, computer chess
- Workplaces: University of Southern Mississippi; University of Alabama at Birmingham
- Thesis: A High-Performance Parallel Algorithm to Search Depth-First Game Trees (1988)

Robert Morgan Hyatt (born 1948) is an American computer scientist and programmer. He co-authored the computer chess programs Crafty and Cray Blitz which won two World Computer Chess Championships in the 1980s. Hyatt was a computer science professor at the University of Southern Mississippi (1970–1985) and University of Alabama at Birmingham (1988–2016).

== Early life and education ==
Hyatt was born in Laurel, Mississippi in 1948. He earned a bachelor's degree in 1970 and an M.S. in 1983, both from the University of Southern Mississippi. His master's dissertation was titled Cray Blitz: A Computer Chess Playing Program. Hyatt earned a Ph.D. in computer and information sciences at the University of Alabama at Birmingham in 1988. His thesis was titled A High-Performance Parallel Algorithm to Search Depth-First Game Trees. Bruce Wilsey Suter was Hyatt's doctoral advisor.

== Career ==
Hyatt is co-author of the computer chess program Crafty and the co-author of Cray Blitz, a two-time winner of the World Computer Chess Championships. He has been actively involved in computer chess since he first started to program a computer to play chess in 1968. These efforts have been supported by various computer vendors such as Univac (1978), Cray Research (1980–1994), and more recently AMD via their developer's lab. Crafty is freely available both in executable form (from many different web sites) and in source form (from Hyatt's home page). Crafty presently participates in many computer chess tournaments (and an occasional human chess tournament). An old version of the source of Cray Blitz is also available on the internet for those interested in seeing what computer chess looked like in the late 1980s.

Hyatt taught computer science for 46 years, from 1970 through 1985 at the University of Southern Mississippi and from 1985 through 2016 at the University of Alabama at Birmingham. He retired in 2016 as an associate professor of computer science at the University of Alabama at Birmingham, in the Department of Computer and Information Sciences (1988–2016).
