= Mephisto (automaton) =

Chess-playing "pseudo-automaton" built in 1876

Mephisto was a 19th-century pseudo-automaton chess player built in London by the Alsatian artificial limb maker Charles Godfrey Gumpel (c. 1835–1921). It took some 6 or 7 years to build and was first shown in 1878 at Gumpel's home in Leicester Square, London.

Unlike earlier so-called "chess automatons" such as The Mechanical Turk and Ajeeb, which concealed a human player inside the cabinet, Mephisto was operated remotely by a chess master located in a different room and connected via a system of mechanical and electrical transmissions, leading later commentators to describe it as a "pseudo-automaton". It is most closely associated with the Hungarian-British master Isidor Gunsberg, who served as its principal operator during public exhibitions and on tour.

== Description ==
Mephisto consisted of a life-size figure representing the mythical Mephistopheles. Dressed in elegant red velvet attire, the figure had a cloven hoof as a foot and was seated in an armchair in front of an unenclosed, open-sided table with a chessboard and pieces. This setup was intended to reassure the player that there were no hidden compartments beneath the board where a person could hide (as in "The Turk").

Contemporary accounts describe the figure's head and upper body as rigid. Its right arm extended over the board to "indicate" moves, while assistants manually moved the chess pieces following the operator's instructions. The chessboard contained shallow recesses that held the bases of the chess pieces in place, preventing them from slipping when the table was jostled. The figure itself was firmly bolted to the table and its arm was given enough reach to cross the board without destabilizing the entire structure.

Before each exhibition, members of the public were invited to inspect the contraption to convince themselves that no player was hidden inside. This was a key element of Mephisto's publicity and of its distinction from earlier chess "automatons".

== History ==
Gumpel completed Mephisto in the mid-1870s, and was first shown in 1878 at Gumpel's home in Leicester Square, London. It soon attracted attention in London chess circles. In 1878 the machine, with Gunsberg operating, was entered in the Counties Chess Association tournament in London. It scored sufficiently well for contemporary writers to credit it as the first "automaton" to win a formal chess event. Mephisto also had a dedicated chess club that met for exhibitions and games against local amateurs and visiting masters.

In 1879 Mephisto went on tour around Britain and continental Europe, with Gunsberg playing remotely for most of the displays. Reports from these exhibitions indicated that the automaton defeated all male challengers in public play, while against women it was said to obtain a clearly winning position before deliberately losing and then extending its hand in a gallant gesture of courtesy.

Mephisto's most prominent international appearance came at the Paris Exposition of 1889, where it was exhibited at the International Theatre. Gumpel engaged the French master Jean Taubenhaus as the hidden operator, and the automaton attracted considerable press coverage as a novelty of both chess and mechanical ingenuity. After the close of the exposition the apparatus was dismantled; its subsequent fate and present whereabouts are unknown.

== Legacy ==
Chess historians often view Mephisto as a transitional device between deceptive chess "automatons" and later, more advanced, automatic chess-playing machines. Its controlled public image and "machine-like" behavior foreshadowed the later interest in mechanical and electronic chess-playing machines.

The name Mephisto was later revived by the German company Hegener & Glaser for a line of dedicated chess computers beginning in 1980. Mephisto went on to win multiple World Microcomputer Chess Championships from 1984 to 1990. Hegener & Glaser was subsequently acquired by Saitek in 1994, which continued to market standalone chess computers under the brand Mephisto.

== See also ==
- The Turk hoax of 1769 to 1854, destroyed in fire
- Ajeeb hoax of 1868 to 1929, destroyed in fire
- El Ajedrecista of 1912, an electromechanical machine with true integrated automation, that is extant
