= ChessMachine =

Chess computer

The ChessMachine was a chess computer sold between 1991 and 1995 by TASC (The Advanced Software Company). It was unique at the time for incorporating both an ARM2 coprocessor for the chess engine on an ISA card which plugged into an IBM PC and a software interface running on the PC to display a chess board and control the engine.

The ISA card was sold with a CPU running at either 16 MHz or 32 MHz, and 128 KB, 512 KB, or 1 MB of onboard memory for transposition tables. This made economic sense at the time of introduction because mainstream PCs were only running from 10 MHz to 25 MHz.

Two engines were sold with the card: The King by Johann de Koning and Gideon by Ed Schröder. Gideon was famed for winning two World Computer Chess Championships on this hardware. The King later became the engine used in the popular Chessmaster series of chess programs.

TASC later incorporated the technology into a dedicated unit, sold from 1993 to 1997. There were two models, the R30 and R40, running at 30 MHz and 40 MHz respectively, and having 512 KB and 1 MB of transposition tables, respectively.

The SmartBoard, a wooden sensory board, was connected to the units, which were in tiny boxes approximately the size of chess clocks. They were only sold with The King chess engine.

This was the end of the era of strong dedicated chess computers, and these two models are acknowledged as the strongest dedicated chess computers that were ever sold. At the height of its strength, the R30 attained a rating over 2350 on computer rating lists, higher than any other dedicated unit. According to the SSDF rating list, the R30 held its own against its contemporary programs running a Pentium-90 MHz and won against other dedicated units.
