= Vasik Rajlich =

American chess player (born 1971)

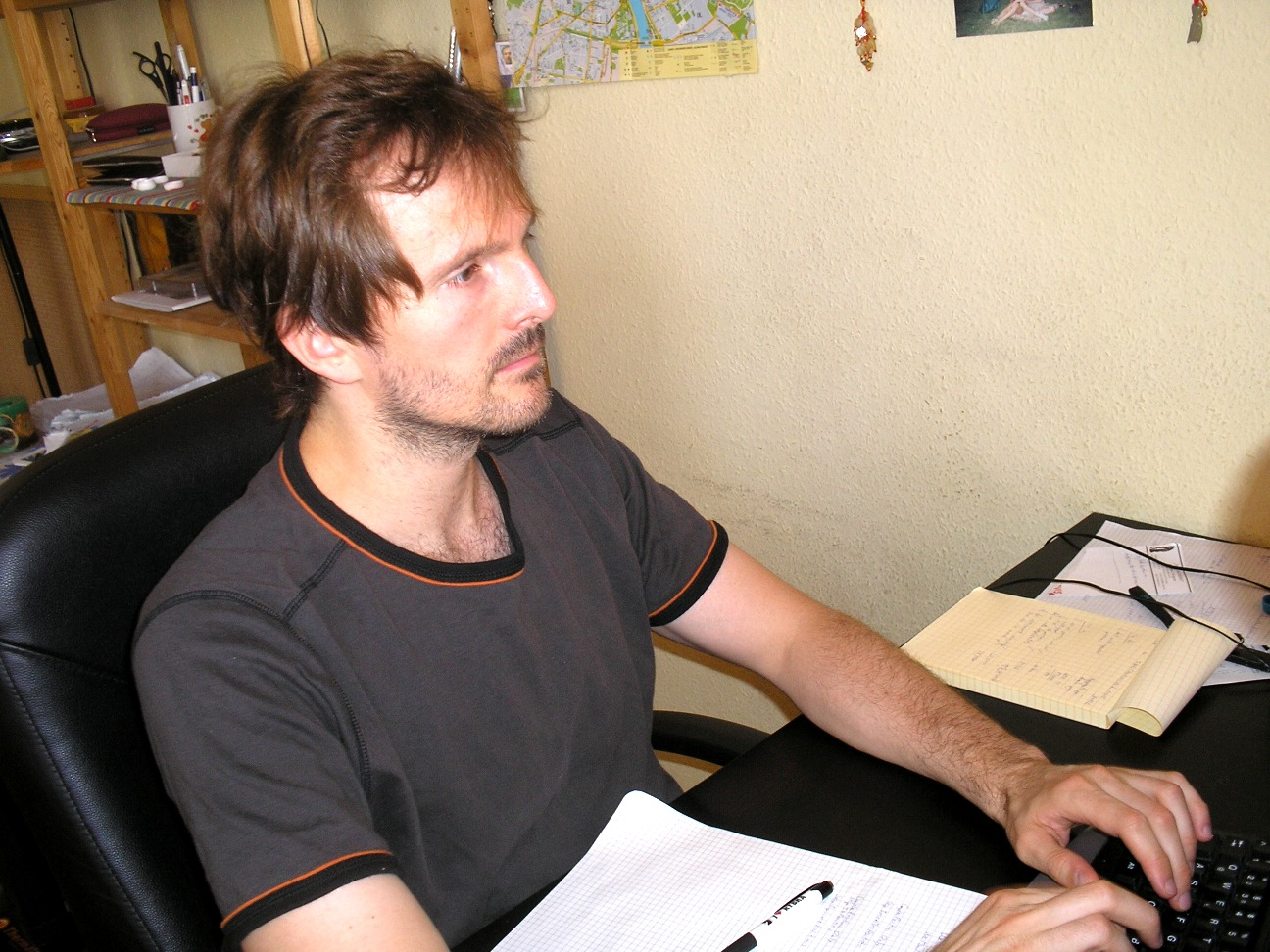
- Rajlich in 2006

Personal information
- Born: 19 March 1971 (age 55) Cleveland, Ohio, U.S.

Chess career
- Title: International Master (2003)
- FIDE rating: 2303 (January 2008)
- Peak rating: 2384 (January 2002)
- Citizenship: Czechoslovakia (formerly); United States
- Education: Massachusetts Institute of Technology
- Known for: Rybka
- Spouse: Iweta Radziewicz (m. 2006)
- Children: 1

Vasik Rajlich (born 19 March 1971) is an International Master in chess and the author of Rybka, previously one of the strongest chess playing programs in the world.

== Biography ==
Rajlich was a dual Czechoslovak-American citizen by birth; he was born in Cleveland, Ohio, to Czech parents, at that time graduate students, but grew up in Prague. His father was Czech computer scientist Václav Rajlich. He later spent years in the United States as a student, graduating from Massachusetts Institute of Technology (MIT).

He married Iweta Radziewicz on 19 August 2006. Iweta, who is also an International Master in chess, helps him with the development of Rybka as its tester. In April 2012, the couple was living in Budapest, Hungary, and had one child, a son.

In April 2012, Rajlich participated in an April Fools' Day prank on ChessBase—claiming by using Rybka he had proven to a "99.99999999% certainty" that the accepted King's Gambit is a draw for White, but only after 3. Be2. Rajlich later admitted on ChessBase, that, "we're still probably a good 25 or so orders of magnitude away from being able to solve something like the King's Gambit. If processing power doubles every 18 months for the next century, we'll have the resources to do this around the year 2120, plus or minus a few decades".

Rajlich's handle on the Internet Chess Club is "vrajlich".

== WCCC disqualification and banning ==
On 28 June 2011, the International Computer Games Association (ICGA) determined that Rajlich had plagiarized two other chess software programs: Crafty and Fruit. The ICGA sanction for Vasik Rajlich and Rybka was the disqualification from the World Computer Chess Championship (WCCC) of 2006, 2007, 2008, 2009 and 2010. Vasik Rajlich is banned for life from competing in the WCCC or any other event organized by or sanctioned by the ICGA. Rajlich had already responded to these charges with an e-mail to David Levy, president of the ICGA, in which he stated:

Rybka “does not include game-playing code written by others”, aside from standard exceptions which wouldn’t count as ‘game-playing’. [...] The vague phrase “derived from game-playing code written by others” also does not in my view apply to Rybka
