= Fritz (chess) =

Chess software

- Genre: Chess
- Developers: Frans Morsch engine 1-13; Matthias Wüllenweber GUI; Mathias Feist GUI; Gyula Horváth engine 14; Vasik Rajlich engine 15-16; Frank Schneider engine 17-19
- Publisher: ChessBase
- Platforms: Microsoft Windows, PlayStation 3, Wii, Nintendo DS
- First release: Fritz; November 1991
- Latest release: Fritz 20; May 2025; 1 year ago

Fritz is a German chess program originally developed for Chessbase by Frans Morsch based on his Quest program, ported to DOS, and then Windows by Mathias Feist. With version 13, Morsch retired, and his engine was first replaced by Gyula Horvath's Pandix, and then with Fritz 15, Vasik Rajlich's Rybka. Fritz 17 switched to the Ginkgo engine, written by Frank Schneider.

The latest version of the consumer product is Fritz 19. This version supports 64-bit hardware and multiprocessing by default.

== History ==
In 1991, the German company ChessBase approached the Dutch chess programmer Frans Morsch about writing a chess engine to add to the database program which they sold. Morsch adapted his Quest program, and ChessBase released it for sale that year as Knightstalker in the U.S. and Fritz throughout the rest of the world. In 1995, Fritz 3 won the World Computer Chess Championship in Hong Kong, beating an early version of Deep Blue. This was the first time that a program running on a consumer-level microcomputer defeated the mainframes that had previously dominated this event.

In 1998, Fritz 5 was released including a Friend mode which would cause the engine to adjust its strength of play over the course of a game based on the level the opponent appeared to be playing. Fritz 5.32 was released soon after replacing the 16-bit architecture with a 32-bit one.

In 2002, Deep Fritz drew the Brains in Bahrain match against Vladimir Kramnik 4–4. Fritz 7, which was released that year, included the ability to play on the Playchess server.

In November 2003, X3D Fritz, a version of Deep Fritz with a 3D interface, drew a four-game match against Garry Kasparov.

Fritz 8, which appeared around this time, provided a 3D Spanish room setting for games to take place. Fritz 9 added a 3D virtual opponent, the Turk.

In 2004, Fritz 8 added a Handicap and Fun mode, allowing players to choose the Elo rating and style that the engine will use. Chessbase native engines can use the Handicap feature: Chess Tiger, Crafty, the Fritz engine, Hiarcs, Houdini, Junior, Rybka, Shredder and Zappa. Some UCI engines can also make use of Handicap, e.g. Fruit and Stockfish.

On June 23, 2005, in the ABC Times Square studios, the AI Accoona Toolbar, driven by a Fritz 9 prototype, drew against the then FIDE World Champion Rustam Kasimdzhanov.

From November 25 to December 5, 2006 Deep Fritz played a six-game match against Kramnik in Bonn. Fritz was able to win 4–2. In this match, Kramnik blundered away game 2, allowing a mate in one.

On SSDF's September 2010 rating list, Deep Fritz 12 placed sixth with a rating of 3110, 135 points higher than Deep Junior 10.1, and 103 points lower than no. 1 ranked Deep Rybka 3 x64. Deep Fritz 11 is eighth on the same list, with a rating of 3073.

On the December 2010 edition of the CCRL rating list, Deep Fritz 12 placed sixth with an Elo rating of 3088, 29 points higher than Deep Junior 11.1a x64, and 174 points lower than no. 1 ranked Deep Rybka 4 x64. Deep Fritz 11 is also sixth on the same list, with a rating of 3097. Fritz has not kept up with modern advances, attaining only 14th on the 2013 CCRL rating list and not participating in any world championships since 2004.

The 2013 release of Deep Fritz 14 switched engines from the original author Frans Morsch's to Pandix, written by Gyula Horváth. A long-time participant in world computer championships since 1984, Pandix was substantially rewritten in 2009, and has been a strong contender since then.

Fritz 15 was released on November 25, 2015, with new features, including switching to Vasik Rajlich's famous Rybka engine. Handicap and Fun mode was dropped, but there is now a function for pawn and piece handicaps (e.g. ceding pawn and move).

Fritz 16 was released on November 12, 2017, with a new Easy game mode which provides for assisted calculation marking good moves with a green circle and bad moves with a red one. This version again uses the Rybka engine.

Fritz 17 was released on November 12, 2019, and uses the Ginkgo engine, written by Frank Schneider. Fritz 18 was released on November 16, 2021.

On March 30, 2022, Fritz 18 Neuronal was released that supplemented Fritz's handcrafted evaluation with an efficiently updatable neural network.

On 14 November 2023, Fritz 19 was released. It features 6 different computer opponents and a new opening training repertoire.

In July 2021, the developers of the open source Stockfish chess engine filed a lawsuit against Chessbase alleging that Fat Fritz 2.0 is a derivative of Stockfish and is in violation of a "central obligation" of Stockfish's GNU General Public License. In November 2022, a settlement was reached in which it was agreed that the license obligations of the GPL-3.0 for the products Fat Fritz 2 and Houdini 6 have not been complied with. In the future, Chessbase will comply with the license terms and to adequately inform the public about the use of the Stockfish software in its products.

In May 2025 Chessbase released Fritz 20. The estimated increase in Elo was quoted as 80, giving Fritz 20 a rating of 3580.

== List of releases ==
- Fritz 7 (2001)
- Fritz 8 (2003)
- Fritz: GrandMaster Challenge - Play Chess (2004)
- Fritz Chess 9 (2006)
- Fritz Chess X (2007)
- Fritz Chess: Grandmaster Challenge III (2007)
- Fritz Chess (2009)
- Fritz Chess: Grandmaster 11 (2010)
- Fritz Chess: Twelfth Edition (2010)
- Fritz Chess XIV (2014)

== The Fritz engine in other companies ==
The American company Viva Media, now a division of Encore, Inc. has been licensed to sell many versions of the Fritz engine and GUI combination. British game publisher Eidos Interactive (now part of Square Enix Europe) published Fritz 6 and 7. In 1998, the German company Data Becker released the program 3D Schach Genie, containing the Shredder engine and Fritz interface. The German company Purple Hills sold Fritz 6 through 12 as Profi Schach 1 through 7. British Excalibur Publishing has published Fritz 9 through 14. American book publisher Simon & Schuster featured the Fritz engine in their Extreme Chess program, as have German game publisher TopWare Interactive in their Battle vs. Chess game.

== Fritz and Chesster ==
Fritz and Chesster is a series of introductory chess programs based on the Fritz engine. Each program provides basic tutorials and games based on one aspect of chess, allowing children to learn the basic rules easily without overwhelming them with too many options at once.

Games follow Prince Fritz, the son of King White, and his cousin Bianca, as Chesster the rat (among others) teaches them the fundamentals of chess so that they can defeat King Black.

There are three programs available in the series:

- Learn To Play Chess With Fritz and Chesster covers all the rules of chess, from basic moves to castling and stalemate.
- Learn To Play Chess With Fritz and Chesster 2: Chess in the Black Castle covers chess strategy and tactics, chess openings, and endgames.
- Learn To Play Chess With Fritz and Chesster, part 3: Chess for Winners contains opening schemes, tactics, recognizing checkmates, endgame training, and key squares.

== Reception ==
The editors of Computer Games Magazine nominated Fritz 6 for their 2000 "Classic Game of the Year" award.

Spanish PC Life magazine gave Fritz 9 a rating of seven out of ten.

== See also ==
- Anti-computer tactics
- Brains in Bahrain
- ChessBase
- Chess engine
- Computer chess
- IBM Deep Blue
- List of chess software
- Pocket Fritz
