= Brains in Bahrain =

Chess Match

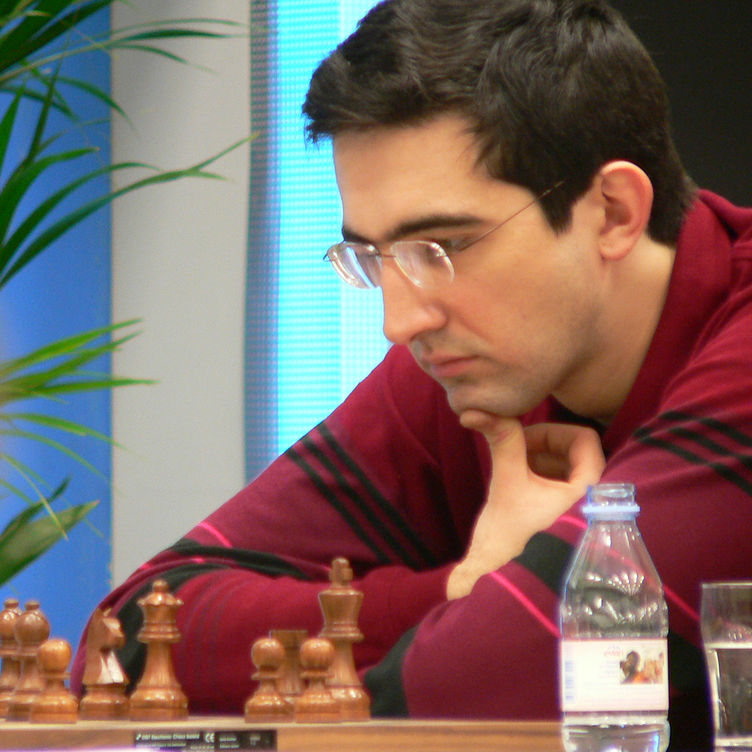
Kramnik in 2005.

Brains in Bahrain was an eight-game chess match between World Chess Champion Vladimir Kramnik and the computer program Deep Fritz 7, held in October 2002. The match ended in a tie 4-4, with two wins for each participant and four draws.

== Outcome of games ==
The first game was drawn. Kramnik won games 2 and 3 by "conventional" anti-computer tactics—play conservatively for a long-term advantage the computer is not able to see in its game tree search. After a draw in game 4, Kramnik lost game 5 due to a blunder. Game 6 was described by commentators as "spectacular". Kramnik, in a better position in the early middlegame, sacrificed a piece to launch an attack—a strategy known to be highly risky against computers, which are at their strongest when defending such attacks. True to form, Fritz found a watertight defense and Kramnik was left in a bad position. Kramnik resigned the game, believing his position to be lost. However, post-game analysis has shown that Fritz was unlikely to have been able to force a win—Kramnik gave up a drawn position. The final two games were draws.

== Selection of Fritz and creation of Deep Fritz ==
Fritz had been chosen to play Kramnik by winning a qualifying event in Cadaques, Spain in 2001. The other competing program was Junior; the reigning world computer chess champion Shredder declined an invitation to compete. The 24-game match started very poorly for Fritz, which lost five games in a row before coming back strongly in the last ten games to tie the series and finally win the play-off. Fritz became Deep Fritz when its hardware was extended to an eight-processor machine for the competition.

== Advantages ==
Kramnik was given several advantages in his match against Fritz when compared to most other Man vs. Machine matches, such as the one Garry Kasparov lost against Deep Blue in 1997. The code of Fritz was frozen some time before the first match and Kramnik was given a copy of Fritz to practice with for several months. Another difference was that in games lasting more than 56 moves, Kramnik was allowed to adjourn until the following day, during which time he could use his copy of Fritz to aid him in his overnight analysis of the position.

== See also ==
- Deep Blue versus Garry Kasparov
