= Crafty =

Chess software

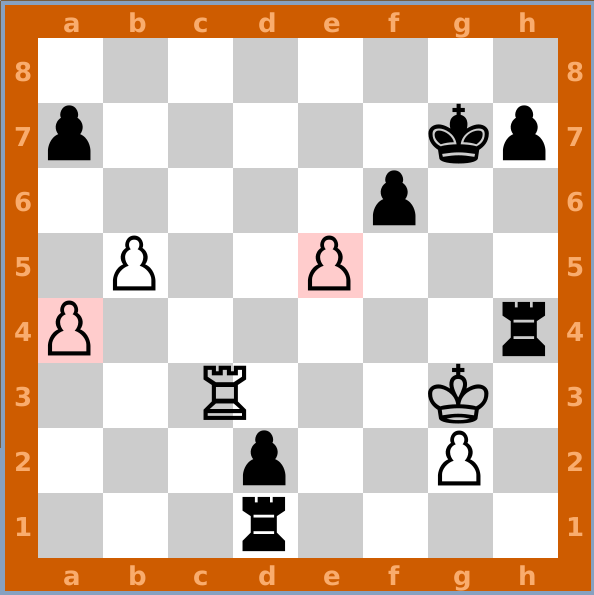
- Crafty (black) versus GnuChess (white)
- Original authors: Robert Hyatt, Michael Byrne, Tracy Riegle, Peter Skinner
- Stable release: 25.6 / February 1, 2020; 6 years ago
- Written in: C
- Type: Chess program
- License: Proprietary, Freeware
- Website: www.craftychess.com

Crafty is a chess program written by UAB professor Robert Hyatt, with development and assistance from Michael Byrne, Tracy Riegle, and Peter Skinner. It is derived from Cray Blitz, winner of the 1983 and 1986 World Computer Chess Championships. Tord Romstad, co-author of Stockfish, described Crafty as "arguably the most important and influential chess program ever".

Crafty finished in second place in the 2010 Fifth Annual ACCA Americas' Computer Chess Championships. Crafty lost only one game, to the first-place winner, Thinker.

Crafty also finished in second place in the 2010 World Computer Rapid Chess Championships. Crafty won seven out of nine games, finishing behind the first-place winner Rybka by ½ point.

In the World Computer Chess Championships 2004, running on slightly faster hardware than all other programs, Crafty took fourth place with the same number of points as the third-place finisher, Fritz 8. On the November 2007 SSDF ratings list, Crafty was 34th with an estimated Elo rating of 2608.

Crafty uses the Chess Engine Communication Protocol and can run under the chess interfaces XBoard and Winboard.

Crafty is written in ANSI C with assembly language routines available on some CPUs, and is very portable. The source code is available, but the software is for "personal use" only and redistribution is only allowed under certain conditions.

Crafty pioneered the use of rotated bitboard data structures to represent the chess board, and was one of the first chess programs to support multiple processors. It also includes negascout search, the killer move heuristic, static exchange evaluation, quiescence search, alpha-beta pruning, a transposition table, a refutation table, an evaluation cache, selective extensions, recursive null-move search, and many other features. Special editions of the program include enhanced features such as an opening book, positional learning, and an endgame tablebase.

Crafty was one of the programs included in the SPEC CPU2000 benchmark test. It is also included as an additional engine in Fritz.

== Graphical front-ends ==
- GNOME Chess
