= Cray Blitz =

Computer chess program

Cray Blitz was a computer chess program written by Robert Hyatt, Harry L. Nelson, and Albert Gower to run on the Cray supercomputer. It was derived from "Blitz", a program that Hyatt started to work on as an undergraduate. Blitz played its first move in the fall of 1968, and was developed continuously from that time until roughly 1980 when Cray Research chose to sponsor the program. Cray Blitz participated in computer chess events from 1980 through 1994 when the last North American Computer Chess Championship was held in Cape May, New Jersey. Cray Blitz won several ACM computer chess events, and two consecutive World Computer Chess Championships, the first in 1983 in New York City, and the second in 1986 in Cologne, Germany.

The program Crafty is the successor to Cray Blitz and is still active and under development.
