= Zappa (chess) =

Chess software

- Developers: Anthony Cozzie, Zach Wegner (since 2010)
- Release: February 2, 2005; 21 years ago
- Stable release: Zappa Mexico II / 2009; 17 years ago
- Operating system: Microsoft Windows, Linux
- Type: Chess engine
- License: Proprietary
- Website: www.acoz.net/zappa/

Zappa, Zap!Chess or Zappa Mexico, is a UCI chess engine written by Anthony Cozzie, a graduate student at the University of Illinois at Urbana-Champaign. The program emphasizes sound search and a good use of multiple processors. Earlier versions of Zappa are free (though not open-source software) and the current version (Zappa Mexico) is available at Shredder Computer Chess.

== History ==
Zappa scored an upset victory at the World Computer Chess Championship in August, 2005, in Reykjavík, Iceland where it won with a score of 10 1/2 out of 11, and beat both Junior and Shredder, programs that had won the championship many times. In the speed chess portion of the tournament Zappa placed second, after Shredder. Zappa's other tournament successes include winning CCT7 on the Internet Chess Club (ICC) and defeating Grandmaster Jaan Ehlvest 3-1.

In Mexico in September 2007 Zappa won a match against Rybka by a score of 5 1/2 - 4 1/2. Many commentators had predicted a slew of draws based on the strength of the engines, but the differences in style provided an interesting match with several decisive games and many fighting draws. For some time, Zappa was considered one of the two strongest commercially available chess programs. Some speculate that Zappa's more efficient SMP parallel search could make it stronger on enough processors.

In March 2008 Anthony Cozzie announced that "the Zappa project is 100% finished", which includes both tournaments and future releases.

In June 2010, Zach Wegner announced that he had acquired the rights to maintain and improve the Zappa engine. The improved engine competed in the 2010 WCCC under the name Rondo, achieving second place behind Rybka before the latter's disqualification.

== Commercialization ==
Immediately after the successful WCCC 2005, there were plans to commercialize Zappa, but the first attempts with Vincent Diepeveen failed. In April 2006, a commercial version dubbed Zap!Chess running under the Fritz GUI was released by ChessBase.

The version of Zappa that won the Zappa-Rybka match, Zappa Mexico, is sold by Shredder Computer Chess, is compatible with Windows and Linux computers with up to 512 CPU cores and supports multipv analysis and Nalimov tablebases.

== Notable games ==
Zappa vs Crafty, WCCC 2005

Position: e8 black rook, g8 black king, d7 white rook, h7 black pawn, a6 black pawn, g6 black pawn, a5 black knight, e5 black rook, g5 black queen, a3 white pawn, c3 white queen, b2 white pawn, a1 white king, b1 white bishop, d1 white rook

Here Zappa played Re1, threatening Qxa5 Rxa5 Rxe8#; the game continued 43... Qf6 (if Rxe1 then Qg7#) 44. Rxe5 Qxe5 45. Ba2+ Kh8 46. Rd8 1–0.
- Zappa vs Crafty, WCCC 2005, 1-0 Despite Zappa being a relative newcomer, it managed to win the tournament and in general caused a bit of a stir in the computer chess community.

== Sources ==
- ""
- Newborn, Monty (2011). Beyond Deep Blue: Chess in the Stratosphere. Springer. ISBN 978-0-85729-341-1. Retrieved 26 October 2013.
