= Chess Tiger =

Chess software

- Developer: Christophe Théron
- Stable release: 15
- Operating system: iOS, Palm OS, Windows
- Type: Chess engine
- License: Proprietary
- Website: www.chesstiger.com

Chess Tiger is a strong chess program developed by Christophe Théron which achieved a number of tournament successes between 2000 and 2002. Although still commercially available, the Windows version has not been developed recently so has largely historical significance only. It is known for its high level of strength and as a trainer engine to help beginners improve their chess techniques.

== Playing strength ==
The playing strength of Chess Tiger is inferior to better known programs such as Fritz and Shredder. In 2001 Chess Tiger won a tournament in Buenos Aires ahead of a number of top grandmasters, and achieved a rating performance of 2788 Elo rating. Chess Tiger won the French and Dutch Chess Computer Championships three times each. Chess Tiger won the first Berliner Emanuel-Lasker Computerchess-Tournament in October 2001.

== Playing style ==
Chess Tiger is designed to be particularly aggressive in its style of play. While most chess engines tend to avoid gambits and sacrifices Chess Tiger actually prefers them. Chess Tiger calculates very quickly even in relatively weak hardware environments which implies that the evaluation function is fairly 'light' and that therefore the balance between speed and positional understanding is weighted in favour of the former.

== Example game ==
This game from the above-mentioned 2001 Argentina Masters Event sees Chess Tiger defeat the well known Grandmaster Oscar Panno. Panno sacrifices the exchange for a pawn early on, and although he gets a second pawn he struggles to fully coordinate his queenside pieces, finally falling for a tactical shot from Chess Tiger on move 34.

White: Chess Tiger

Black: Oscar Panno

1.e4 c5 2.Nf3 e6 3.Nc3 a6 4.d4 cxd4 5.Nxd4 b5 6.Bd3 Qb6 7.Nb3 Bb7 8.a4 b4 9.a5 Qc7 10.Na4 Nf6 11.Nb6 Nxe4 12.Nxa8 Bxa8 13.Be3 Nf6 14.O-O Bd6 15.g3 h5 16.Bb6 Qc6 17.f3 Bc7 18.Qd2 Bxb6+ 19.axb6 Qxb6+ 20.Qf2 Qxf2+ 21.Kxf2 Ke7 22.Rfe1 Rc8 23.Nd4 g6 24.Ra4 Nd5 25.Bxa6 Nxa6 26.Rxa6 Bb7 27.Ra7 Rb8 28.c4 bxc3 29.bxc3 Ba8 30.c4 Nb4 31.Rea1 Bc6 32.Kf1 Rc8 33.Rb1 Nd3 34.Rb8 1-0

== Other platforms ==
A version of Chess Tiger is available for the iPhone and other mobile devices running the iOS Mobile Operating System, as well as for Palm OS.

== See also ==
- Chess engine
- Computer chess
- List of chess software
