= HIARCS =

- Developer: Mark Uniacke
- Initial release: 1980; 46 years ago
- Stable release: 15 / January 2022; 4 years ago
- Written in: C
- Operating system: Microsoft Windows, Mac OS X, iOS, Pocket PC, Palm OS
- Type: Chess engine
- License: Proprietary
- Website: www.hiarcs.com

HIARCS is a proprietary UCI chess engine developed by Mark Uniacke. Its name is an acronym standing for higher intelligence auto-response chess system. Because Hiarcs is written portable in C, it is available on multiple platforms such as Pocket PC, Palm OS, PDAs, iOS, Microsoft Windows and Mac OS X.

HIARCS opening book authors over time were Eric Hallsworth, Sebastian Böhme and Harvey Williamson, who is also operating HIARCS regularly at various computer chess tournaments. HIARCS author Mark Uniacke said in a 2011 video interview that one of his current priorities in development is improving HIARCS to play in a more "human-like fashion" at different Elo strengths.

== History ==
The first version of HIARCS was written in 1980 in PDP-11 Basic, when Mark Uniacke was only 15 years old. Subsequent versions were also written in interpreted Basic, which meant that the program was rather slow. To compensate for this, Mark developed some heuristics to guide the program's search and evaluation in a more 'targeted' way. This resulted in a program that relied on positional algorithms, rather than search depth.

At the end of the 80s, HIARCS was rewritten in C, and soon competed in computer chess tournaments. In 1991, HIARCS went commercial and HIARCS 1.0 was released for PCs and the MS-DOS operating system. In 1996, HIARCS 4.0 became the first version to be marketed by Chessbase sold inside the Fritz GUI.

Version 11, the first version to support multiprocessing, was released in December 2006. HIARCS 12.1 and 13 are the engines in Pocket Fritz by Chessbase. Since Version 14, released in August 2012, HIARCS has been sold along with its own GUI (Chess Explorer) available on Mac OS X and Windows.

== Competition results ==
HIARCS has won numerous computer and human tournaments. In 1991, it won the title of the World Amateur Microcomputer Chess Champion at the 11th World Microcomputer Chess Championship (WMCCC), in 1992, it won the gold medal at the 4th Computer Olympiad, and in 1993, it won the World Microcomputer Chess Championship held in Munich.

In April 1997, HIARCS 6.0 became the first PC chess program to win a match played at tournament time controls over a FIDE International Master. In the same year, HIARCS went on to win the Godesberg Open ahead of Grandmasters and International Masters.

In January 2003, HIARCS played a four-game match against Grandmaster Evgeny Bareev, world number 8 at the time. All the four games were drawn, resulting in a tied match.

Since 2005, HIARCS has been tested to be the strongest chess program available on a handheld device. It is the top handheld on the SSDF rating list, and was considered the strongest engine in a comprehensive review of 63 handheld chess programs.

In December 2007, HIARCS won the 17th International Paderborn Computer Chess Championship, and after the disqualification of Rybka, HIARCS was placed first at the 2008 World Computer Chess Championship. It also won the 2009 International CSVN Tournament, and the World Chess Software Championship in 2011 and 2013.

Pocket Fritz 4 (which uses the HIARCS chess engine) won the Copa Mercosur (a category 6 tournament) in Buenos Aires, Argentina, with 9 wins and 1 draw on August 4–14, 2009, achieving a performance rating of 2898 while running on the HTC Touch HD mobile phone. It searched around 20,000 nodes per second, far less than it would on an average home computer.

== Notable games ==
- HIARCS vs Viswanathan Anand, AEGON Simul, The Hague NED 1997 · Sicilian Defense: Dragon. Classical Variation General (B72) · ½–½ HIARCS plays in a simultaneous exhibition, amongst other chess engines, against Grandmaster Viswanathan Anand.
- Zappa vs HIARCS, CCT9 2007 · Sicilian Defense: Najdorf Variation. Poisoned Pawn Accepted (B97) · 0–1 Zappa traps HIARCS's queen but ends up losing.
- HIARCS vs Jonny 17th World Computer Chess Championship (2009) · Sicilian Defense: Scheveningen Variation. English Attack (B80) 1–0 HIARCS sacrifices a piece for positional gain.
HIARCS vs Jonny,
17th WCCC 2009

Position: a8 black rook, c8 black bishop, e8 black king, f8 black bishop, h8 black rook, c7 black queen, d7 black knight, f7 black pawn, g7 black pawn, a6 black pawn, e6 black pawn, f6 black knight, h6 black pawn, d5 black pawn, b4 black pawn, d4 white knight, e4 white pawn, f4 white bishop, g4 white pawn, h4 white pawn, f3 white pawn, a2 white pawn, b2 white pawn, c2 white pawn, d2 white queen, e2 white knight, c1 white king, d1 white rook, f1 white bishop, h1 white rook

Here HIARCS played 13. Bf4, inviting Black to fork White's bishop and knight with 13...e5. The game continued 14. Bh2 Qa5 15. Kb1 exd4, with no apparent compensation for White.
