= Mephisto (chess computer) =

Chess Computer

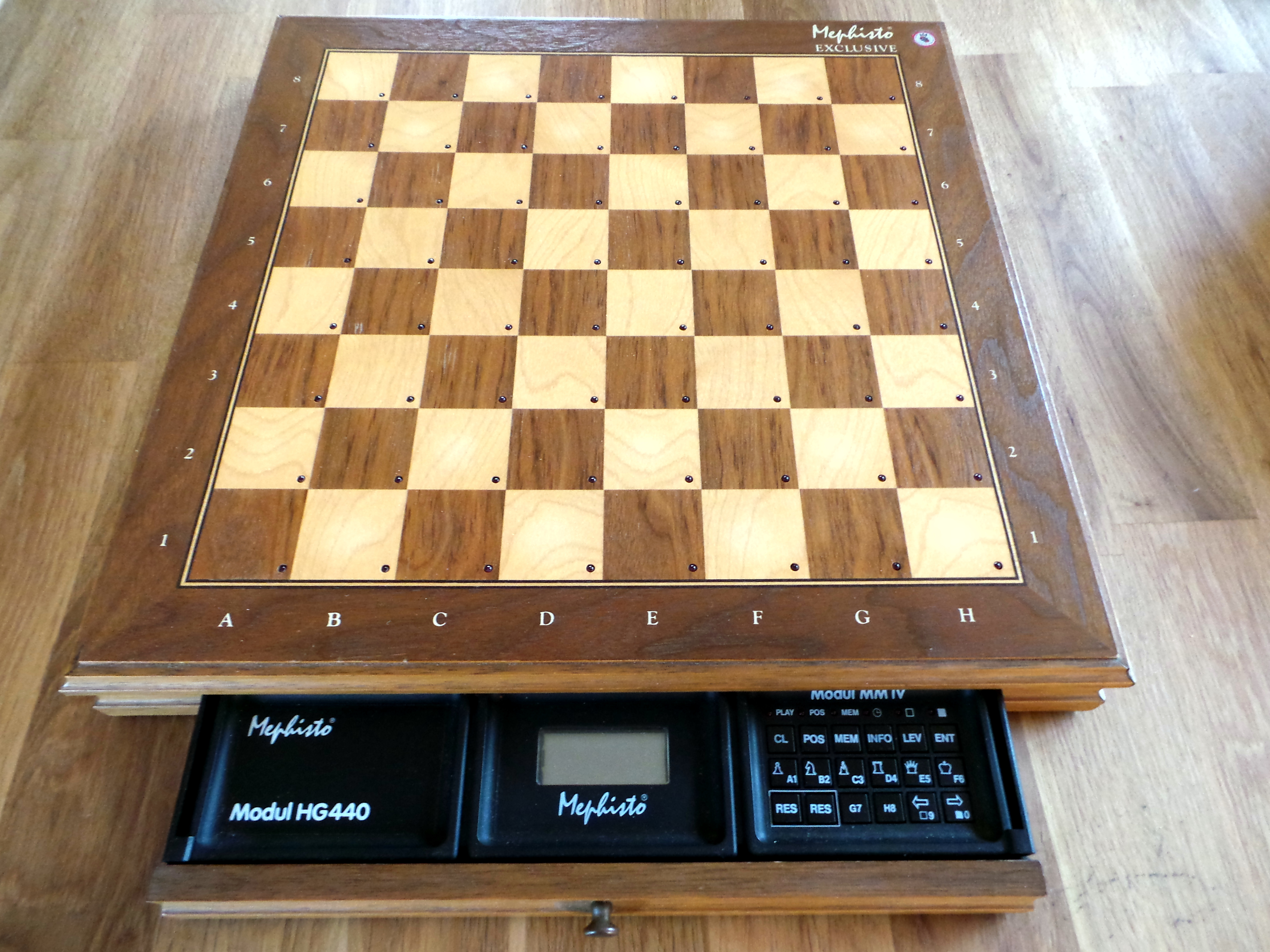
Mephisto Exclusive

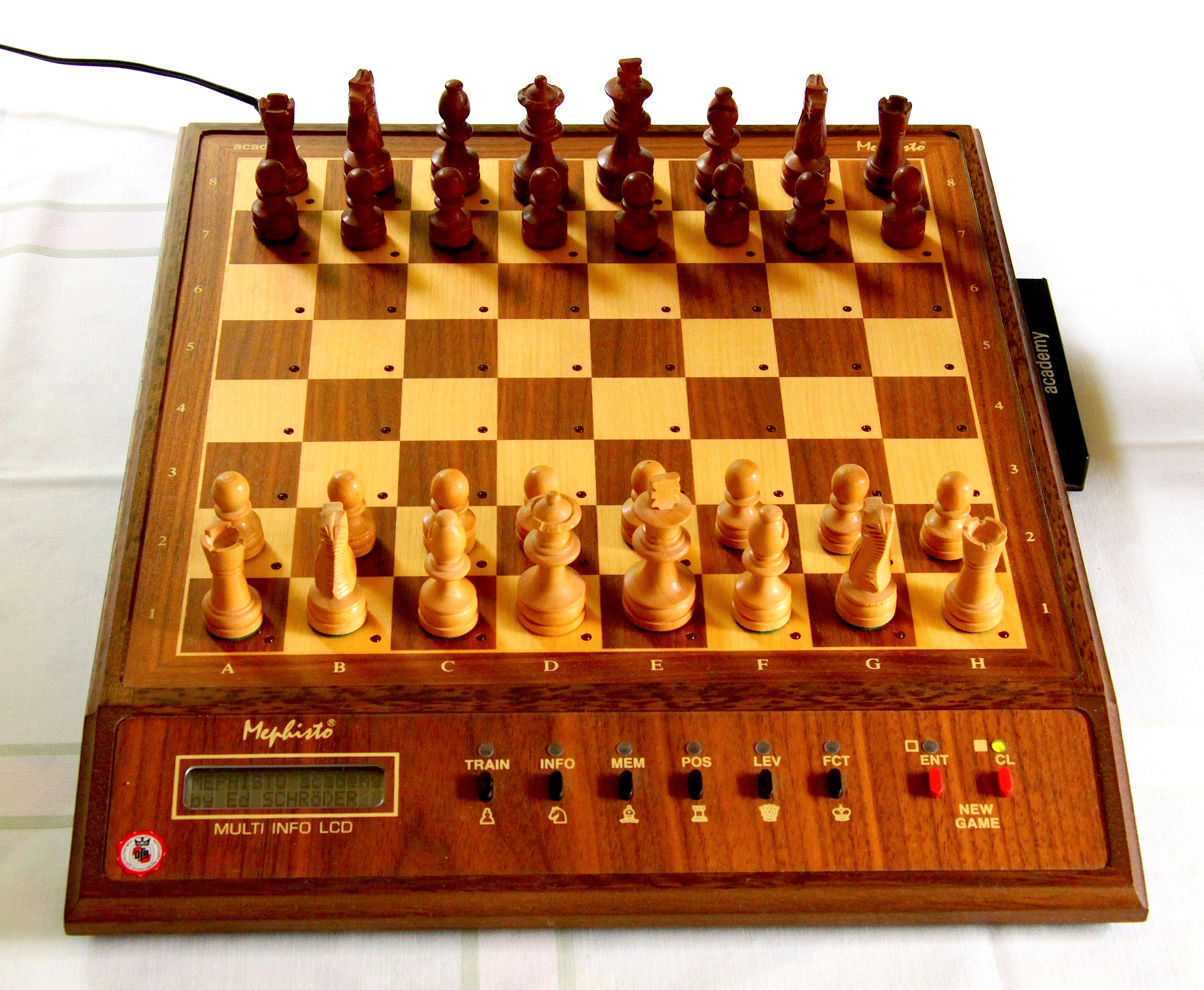
Mephisto Academy (1989)

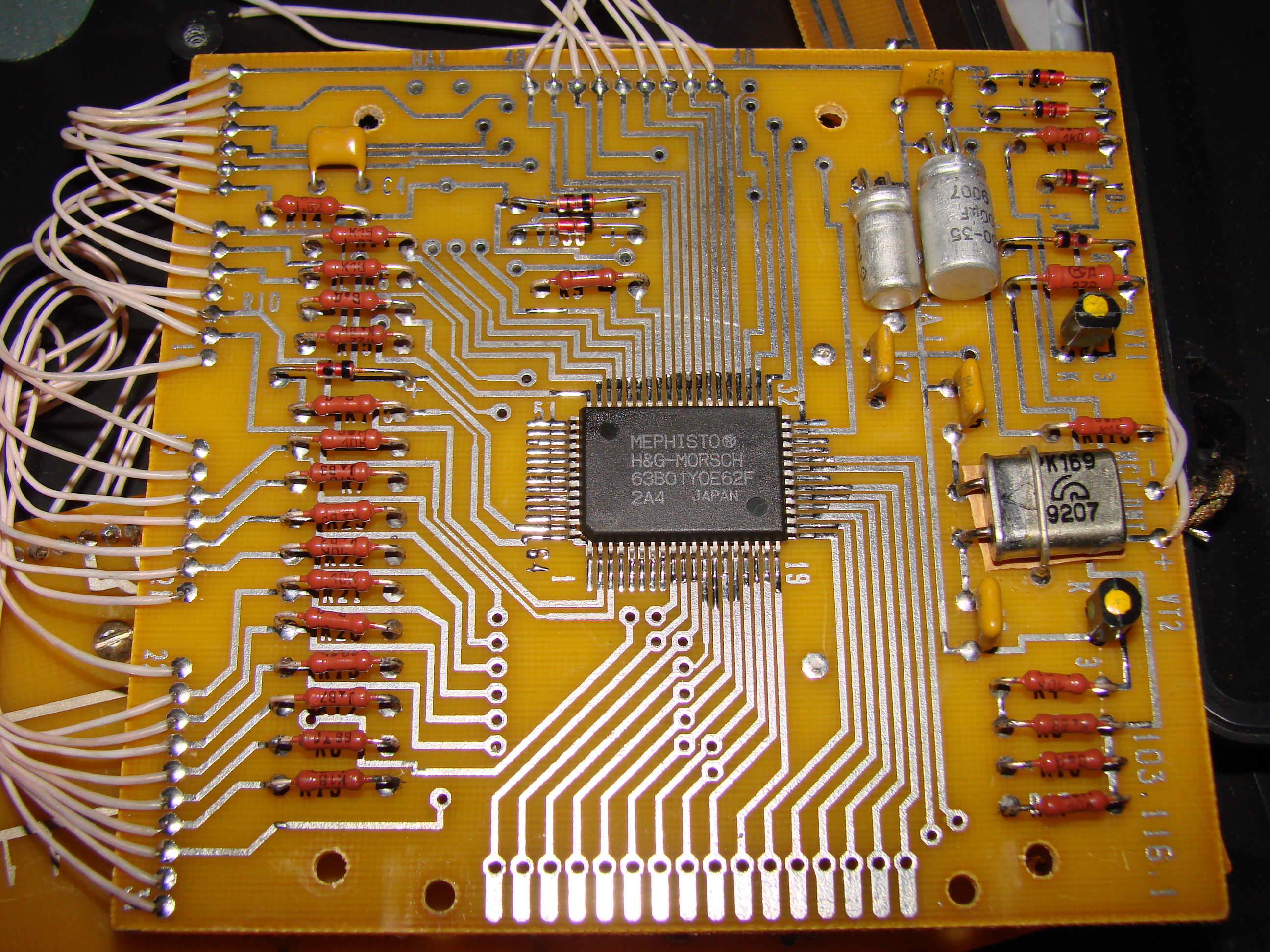
Internal chip of a Mephisto computer, showing Hegener & Glaser initials, and program author name (Franz Morsch)

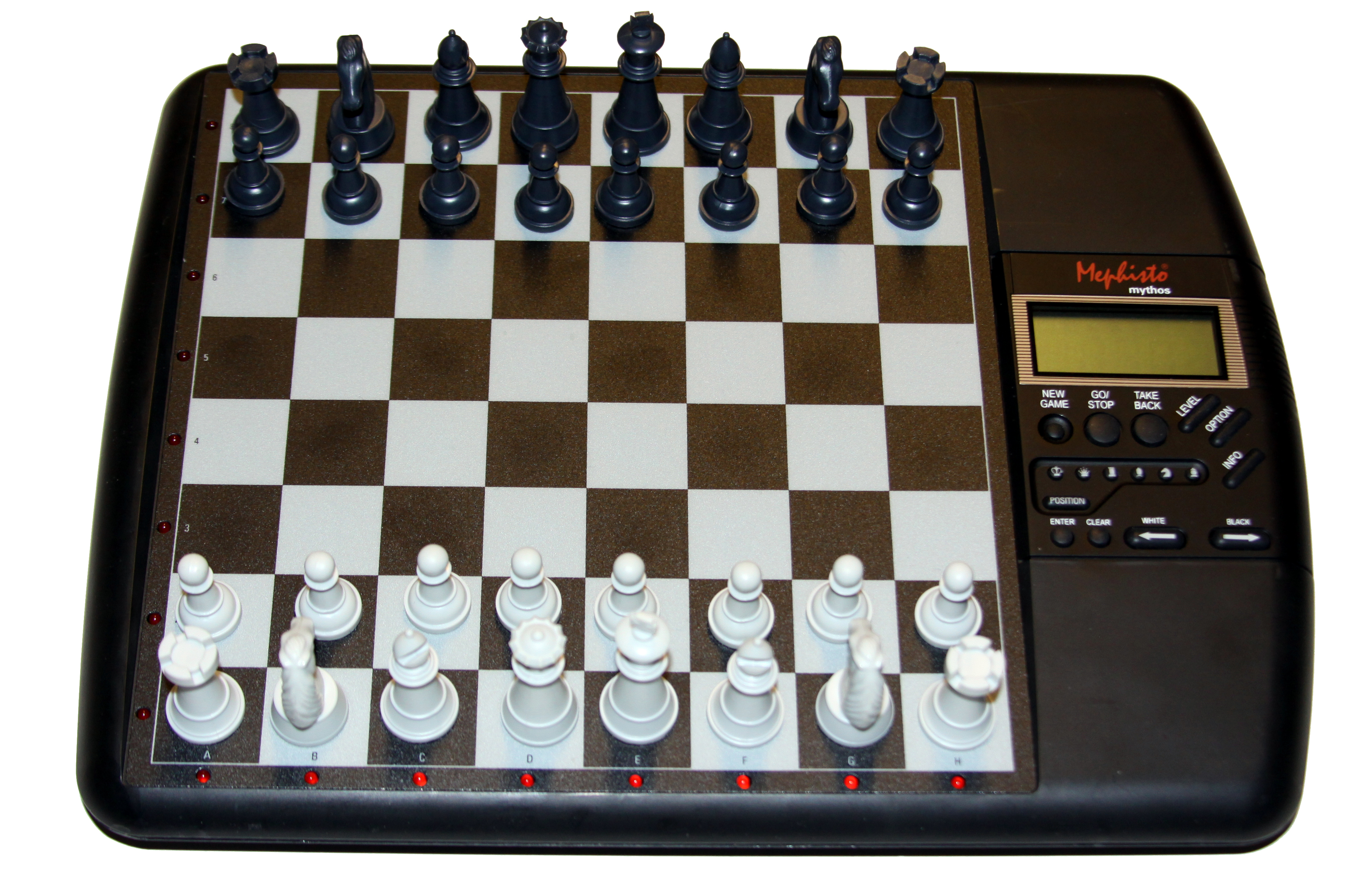
Mephisto Mythos (1995)

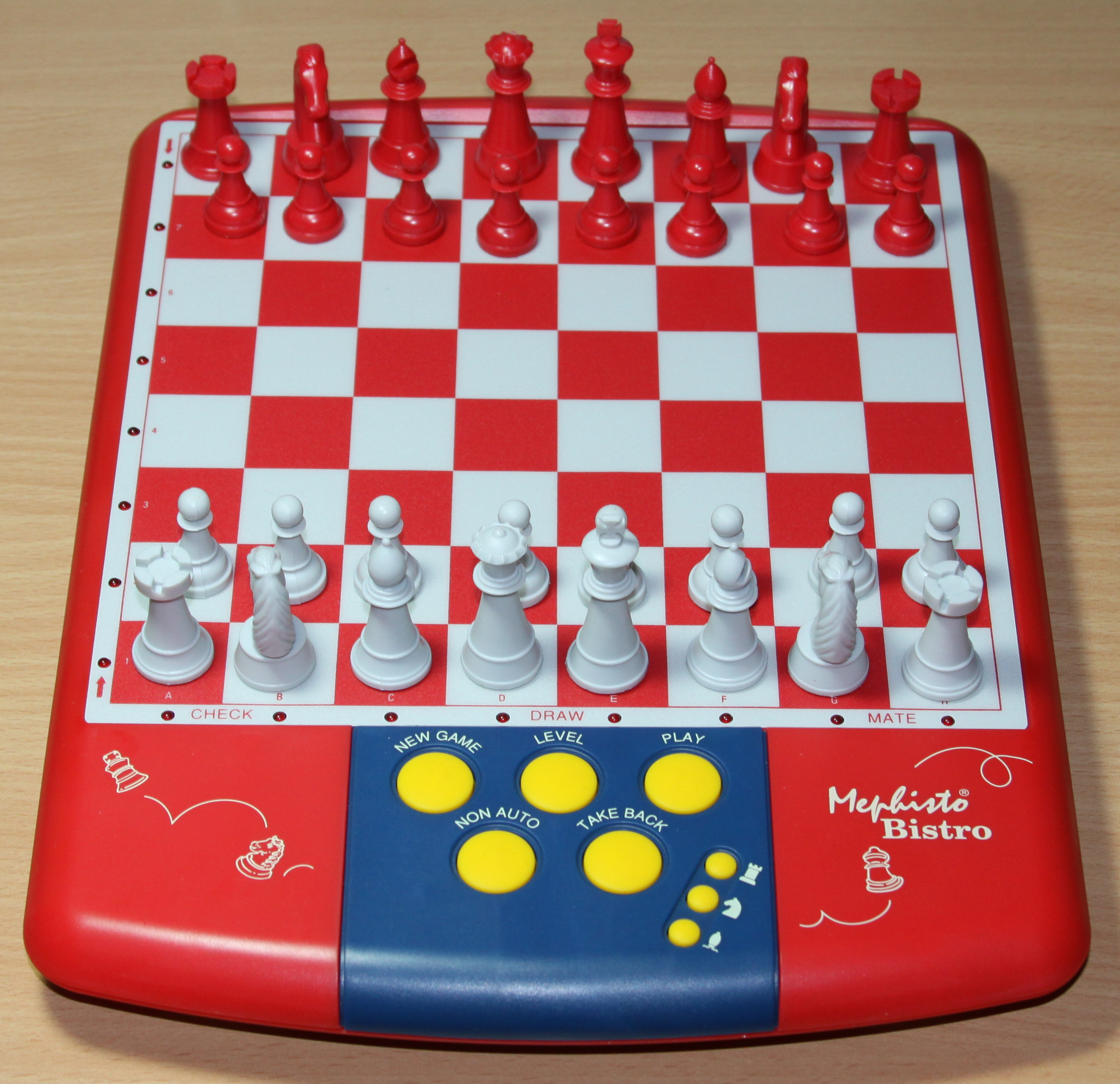
Mephisto Bistro (1995; also available in yellow and black)

Mephisto was a line of chess computers sold by Hegener & Glaser (H+G). In addition to integrated travel and sensory computers, they also sold a line of modular electronic autosensory boards (Modular, Exclusive, München, and Bavaria) which could accept different program, processor, and display modules.

Its strongest software was written by Richard Lang, who later ported it to personal computers as Psion and ChessGenius. Lang's Mephisto programs won six World Computer Chess Championships (WCCC) from 1984 to 1990. H&G also sold engines licensed from Johan de Koning, Ed Schröder, and Frans Morsch. Different models used different 8-bit, 16-bit and 32-bit processors, including the MOS Technology 6502, Motorola 68HC05, Motorola 68000 and others.

Hegener & Glaser and its Mephisto brand were bought in 1994 by Saitek. Their computers currently sold under the Mephisto brand use programs written by Frans Morsch.

== Hegener & Glaser (Mephisto) ==
- 1969 – established in Munich by Manfred Hegener and Florian Glaser for the production of semiconductors
- 1978 – the programmers Thomas Nitsche and Elmar Henne came into contact with H+G Thomas Nitsche and Elmar Henne
- 1980 – the "Mephisto" Tradename was created, nicknamed Brikett (German for briquette) — the first German Chess Computer — programmed by Thomas Nietsche and Elmar Henne, appeared in stores.
- 1983 – Introduction of the Modular system, with the Mobil, Modular, and Exclusive boards and MM I module.
- 1984 – with Richard Lang and his Psion chess (Winner of World Microcomputer Chess Championship 1984 in Glasgow) began a long series of World Championship successes.
- 1985 – introduction of Lang's first Mephisto module, the Amsterdam 68000
- 1989 – over 90% of all chess computers sold in Germany were Mephistos
- 1989 – H+G buys "Fidelity Electronics Inc." for c. US$7 million
- 1990 – the market for high-priced chess computers collapses. The cause is the growth of high-performance 486 PCs and the availability of newly developed low-cost strong chess software for PCs.
- 1992 – H+G shows losses of 28 million Deutsche Marks
- 1992 – Ed Schröder wins with Gideon 3.1 (later sold as Mephisto Risc 2) the open 7. WCCC — ahead of large mainframe computers and special hardware machines
- 1994 – H+G is bought by Saitek for c. 7 million DM
- 1994 – Richard Lang's Genius (Mephisto London) beats Garry Kasparov in the Intel World Chess Grand Prix Turnier in London on a Pentium Processor
- 1997 – Manfred Hegener and Ossi Weiner form the company "Millennium 2000 GmbH Hegener & Weiner" and produce the "Millennium Schachpartner 2000", sold at 99 DM
- 2005 – Phoenix Chess Systems releases the Resurrection module for existing Mephisto modular boards. The hardware uses a 200 MHz ARM processor to run modern chess engines, resulting in the strongest dedicated chess computer ever created.
- 2007 – Phoenix Chess Systems releases an updated module set, the Resurrection II, with a faster 500 MHz XScale processor.

== Mephisto Modular System ==
Boards:

- Mephisto Mobil (folding magnetic board)
- Mephisto Modular (plastic autosensory board)
- Mephisto Exclusive (40x40 cm wooden autosensory board)
- Mephisto München (50x50 cm wooden autosensory board)
- Mephisto Bavaria (50x50 cm wooden piece recognition board)

Modules:

Mephisto Marco Polo

- Mephisto Almeria 68000
- Mephisto Almeria 68020
- Mephisto Amsterdam
- Mephisto B&P
- Mephisto Dallas 68000
- Mephisto Dallas 68020
- Mephisto Genius 68030
- Mephisto III-S Glasgow
- Mephisto London 68000
- Mephisto London 68020
- Mephisto London 68030
- Mephisto Lyon 68000
- Mephisto Lyon 68020
- Mephisto Magellan
- Mephisto Mirage
- Mephisto MM I
- Mephisto MM II
- Mephisto MM IV
- Mephisto MM V
- Mephisto MM VI
- Mephisto MM VI Schröder - was never distributed
- Mephisto Mystery Modul
- Mephisto PC Modul
- Mephisto Polgar
- Mephisto Polgar 10 MHz Beware: modified Exclusive Board
- Mephisto Portorose 68000
- Mephisto Portorose 68020
- Mephisto Rebell 5.0
- Mephisto Risc 1MB
- Mephisto Risc 2
- Mephisto Roma 68000
- Mephisto Roma 68020
- Mephisto Roma II
- Mephisto Senator
- Mephisto Vancouver 68000
- Mephisto Vancouver 68020

== Tournament machines ==
Mephisto sold limited edition versions of Lang's championship winning programs in dedicated boards with upgraded processors, cooling, and memory, similar to the hardware used in the championship tournaments.

- Mephisto TM Roma (68020, 25 MHz)
- Mephisto TM Almeria (68020, 30 MHz)
- Mephisto TM Portorose (68030, 36 MHz)
- Mephisto TM Lyon (68030, 36 MHz)
- Mephisto TM Vancouver (68030, 36 MHz)
- Mephisto TM London (68030, 36 MHz)
- Mephisto Wundermaschine (80486, 66 MHz)

== Other chess computers from the manufacturer Hegener & Glaser ==
- Mephisto Academy
- Mephisto Advanced Travel Chess Computer
- Mephisto Alaska
- Mephisto America
- Mephisto America II
- Mephisto Atlanta
- Mephisto Avanti
- Mephisto Beach
- Mephisto Berlin 68000
- Mephisto Berlin Professional
- Mephisto Bistro
- Mephisto Champion
- Mephisto Chessbook
- Mephisto Chess Challenger
- Mephisto Chess Explorer
- Mephisto Chess Trainer
- Mephisto College
- Mephisto ESB 6000
- Mephisto Europa
- Mephisto Europa A
- Mephisto Excalibur
- Mephisto Excalibur Glasgow
- Mephisto Expert Travel Chess
- Mephisto Explorer Pro
- Mephisto HG 170
- Mephisto HG 240
- Mephisto HG 440
- Mephisto HG 550
- Mephisto I
- Mephisto II
- Mephisto III
- Mephisto Junior (Sensor)
- Mephisto Junior (Tasten)
- Mephisto Junior Master Chess Computer
- Mephisto Madison
- Mephisto Maestro Travel Chess Computer
- Mephisto Manhattan
- Mephisto Marco Polo
- Mephisto Master Chess
- Mephisto Mega IV
- Mein erster Mephisto
- Mephisto Merlin 16K
- Mephisto MeXs
- Mephisto Miami
- Mephisto Micro Travel Chess Computer
- Mephisto Milano
- Mephisto Milano Pro
- Mephisto Mini
- Mephisto Modena
- Mephisto Monaco
- Mephisto Mondial
- Mephisto Mondial II
- Mephisto Mondial 68000XL
- Mephisto Montana
- Mephisto Monte Carlo
- Mephisto Monte Carlo IV
- Mephisto Monte Carlo IV LE
- Mephisto Montreal 68000
- Mephisto Montreux (Johan de Koning)
- Mephisto Mystery
- Mephisto Mythos
- Mephisto Nigel Short
- Mephisto PC Schachbrett (Electronic chess board connected to a PC)
- Mephisto Phantom
- Mephisto Schachakademie
- Mephisto Schachschule
- Mephisto Schachschule II
- Mephisto Super Mondial
- Mephisto Super Mondial II
- Mephisto Supermini
- Mephisto Talking Chess Trainer
- Mephisto Talking Chess Academy
- Mephisto Travel Chess
- Russian made chess computer ″ШК-1″ (ShK-1 for ″shakhmatniy kompyuter″ – Chess Computer) using "Mephisto H&G OEM chip"

== See also ==
- ChessGenius
- Saitek
- Computer chess
- Mephisto (automaton)
