= REBEL (chess) =

Chess engine software

- Original author: Ed Schröder
- Release: 1980
- Stable release: 16.3 / March 11, 2024; 2 years ago
- Type: Chess engine
- License: GNU General Public License v3.0 (14 and after) proprietary commercial software (13 and before)
- Website: rebel13.nl

REBEL is a world champion chess program developed by Ed Schröder. Development of REBEL started in 1980 on a TRS-80, and it was ported many times to dedicated hardware and the fastest microprocessors of the day:

- 1980s – Running on a TRS-80, Apple II, and inside of Mephisto brand dedicated chess computers, it won the Dutch open computer chess championship four times.
- 1991 – Ported to the ARM ChessMachine and named Gideon, it won the World Microcomputer Chess Championship.
- 1992 – Gideon won the World Computer Chess Championship, the first time a microprocessor came ahead of a field of mainframes, supercomputers, and custom chess hardware.
- 1990s – REBEL was ported to MS-DOS and then Microsoft Windows and sold commercially
  - 1997 – REBEL won a match with GM Arthur Yusupov 10.5–6.5, the first successful challenge of a chess grandmaster by a commercial program.
  - 1998 – REBEL won a match with GM Viswanathan Anand 5–3 (but lost 0.5–1.5 in the standard time control section of the match). He was rated number two in the world at the time.
- 2004 – Ed Schröder retired, releasing the last version of REBEL as the freeware chess engine Pro Deo.
- 2022 - On January 12, 2022, Ed Schröder came out of retirement to release REBEL 14 as a free chess engine. It incorporates an efficiently updatable neural network in REBEL's evaluation function, along with a heavily modified version of Fruit's search.

== Reception ==
Games Domain reviewed version 7.0 and wrote: "Rebel 7.0 is an impressive chess program, both in terms of playing strength and features."

== See also ==
- Fruit (software)
