= Junior (chess program) =

Chess engine

Junior is a computer chess program written by the Israeli programmers Amir Ban and Shai Bushinsky. Grandmaster Boris Alterman assisted, in particular with the opening book. Junior can take advantage of multiple processors, taking the name Deep Junior when competing this way in tournaments.

According to Bushinsky, one of the innovations of Junior over other chess programs is the way it counts moves. Junior counts orthodox, ordinary moves as two moves, while it counts interesting moves as only one move, or even less. In this way interesting variations are analyzed more meticulously than less promising lines. This seems to be a generalization of search extensions already used by other programs.

Another approach its designers claim to use is 'opponent modeling'; Junior might play moves that are not objectively the strongest but that exploit the weaknesses of the opponent. According to Don Dailey "It has some evaluation that can sting if it's in the right situation—that no other program has."

== Results ==
In 2003 Deep Junior played a six-game match against Garry Kasparov, which resulted in a 3–3 tie.

It won a 2006 rapid game against Teimour Radjabov.

In June 2007, Deep Junior won the "ultimate computer chess challenge" organized by FIDE, defeating Deep Fritz 4–2. These programs opted out of the World Computer Chess Championship, which was held at the same time and won by Rybka with a score of 10/11.

Junior won the World Microcomputer Chess Championship in 1997 and 2001 and the World Computer Chess Championship in 2002, 2004, 2006, 2009, 2011 and 2013; both organized by the International Computer Games Association.
