= World Computer Chess Championship =

Computer chess competition

World Computer Chess Championship (WCCC) was an event held periodically from 1974 to 2024 where computer chess engines competed against each other. The event was organized by the International Computer Games Association (ICGA, until 2002 ICCA). It was often held in conjunction with the World Computer Speed Chess Championship and the Computer Olympiad, a collection of computer tournaments for other board games. Instead of using engine protocols, the games were played on physical boards by human operators.

The WCCC was open to all types of computers including microprocessors, supercomputers, clusters, and dedicated chess hardware.

Due to the requirement to be present on-site, play on a physical board, and strict rules of originality, many strong programs refrained from participating in the ICGA events. As the conditions of the software championship can easily be emulated by anyone with a high-end PC, there are now privately conducted tournaments, such as Top Chess Engine Championship, that have much broader attendance, as well as a larger number of games to reduce the influence of chance.

== Championship results ==
In 2007, the reigning champion Junior declined to defend its title.

For the 2009 edition, the rules were changed to limit platforms to commodity hardware supporting at most eight cores, thereby excluding supercomputers and large clusters. However, this was reversed in the following year and a parallel Software Championship was held instead; unlimited hardware was once again allowed in the championship proper.

Event #	Year	Location	Participants	Winner
1	1974	Stockholm	13	Kaissa
2	1977	Toronto	16	Chess 4.6
3	1980	Linz	18	Belle
4	1983	New York	22	Cray Blitz
5	1986	Cologne	22	Cray Blitz
6	1989	Edmonton	24	Deep Thought
7	1992	Madrid	22	ChessMachine (Gideon)
8	1995	Hong Kong	24	Fritz
9	1999	Paderborn	30	Shredder
10	2002	Maastricht	18	Deep Junior
11	2003	Graz	16	Shredder
12	2004	Bar-Ilan University, Ramat Gan	14	Deep Junior
13	2005	Reykjavík	12	Zappa
14	2006	Turin	18	Junior
15	2007	Amsterdam	12	Zappa (Note: Rybka originally won the WCCC in 2007–2010, but was later disqualified for plagiarising code in a controversial decision.)
16	2008	Beijing	10	HIARCS
17	2009	Pamplona	10	Junior, Shredder, Sjeng
18	2010	Kanazawa	10	Rondo, Thinker
19	2011	Tilburg	9	Junior
20	2013	Yokohama	6	Junior
21	2015	Leiden	9	Jonny
22	2016	Leiden	6	Komodo
23	2017	Leiden	4	Komodo
24	2018	Stockholm	8	Komodo
25	2019	Macau	6	Komodo
26 (Note: In 2020 and 2021 there were no events due to the COVID-19 pandemic.)	2022	Vienna	5	Komodo Dragon, Leela Chess Zero
27	2023	Valencia	4	Stoofvlees
28	2024	Santiago de Compostela	9	Jonny, Stoofvlees, Raptor

== World Chess Software Championship ==
From 2010 a new tournament was introduced and held at the same location and during the same period as the World Computer Chess Championship. The rules for the World Chess Software Championship (WCSC) stated that competing programs must run on machines with identical hardware specifications. Time control was game in 45 minutes with 15 second increment.

Event #	Year	Location	Participants	Winner	Hardware
1	2010	Kanazawa	9	Shredder	Intel quad core Xeon 2.66 GHz, 8MB Hash
2	2011	Tilburg	5	HIARCS	Intel Core2 Duo, 1.7 GHz, 2MB Hash
3	2013	Yokohama	6	HIARCS	Intel quad core i7, 2.7 GHz, 16MB Hash
4	2015	Leiden	8	Shredder	Intel quad core i7, 2.7 GHz, 16MB Hash
5	2016	Leiden	7	Komodo	Intel quad core i7, 3.4 GHz, 16MB Hash
6	2017	Leiden	7	Shredder	Intel quad core i7, 3.4 GHz, 16MB Hash
7	2018	Stockholm	9	Komodo	Intel quad core i7, 1.8 GHz, 16MB Hash
8	2019	Macau	6	Komodo	Intel Pentium Silver N5000, 4 GB RAM
9 (Note: In 2020 and 2021 there were no events due to the COVID-19 pandemic.)	2022	Vienna	6	Ginkgo	subnotebook
10	2023	Valencia	4	Fritz	AMD Ryzen 7 3700X, NVIDIA GT710
11	2024	Santiago de Compostela	9	Rofchade	Intel i5-14400 with 16GB RAM

== World Microcomputer Chess Championship ==
From 1980 to 2001, the ICCA/ICGA organized a separate cycle of championships limited to programs running on microprocessors. In the first three championships, the winners were dedicated chess computers, and then in 1984, Richard Lang's Psion program shared first place, running on an IBM PC under MS-DOS.

At the 14th WMCCC in Jakarta, the Israeli team Junior was denied entry to Indonesia and some other teams dropped out in protest.

The 16th WMCCC was the same as the 9th WCCC above.

Event #	Year	Location	Participants	Winner
1	1980	London	12	Fidelity Chess Challenger
2	1981	Travemünde	8	Fidelity X
3	1983	Budapest	15	Fidelity Elite A/S
4	1984	Glasgow	12	Fidelity Elite X, Mephisto, Princhess X, Psion
5	1985	Amsterdam	6 / 5	Mephisto / Nona
6	1986	Dallas	6	Mephisto
7	1987	Rome	2 / 7	Mephisto / Psion
8	1988	Almería	2 / 7	Mephisto
9	1989	Portorož	9	Mephisto
10	1990	Lyon	12	Mephisto
11	1991	Vancouver, Canada	15	ChessMachine (Gideon)
12	1993	Munich	28	HIARCS
13	1995	Paderborn, Germany	33	MChess Pro 5.0
14	1996	Jakarta	27	Shredder
15	1997	Paris	34	Junior
16	1999	Paderborn, Germany	30	Shredder
17	2000	London	14	Shredder
18	2001	Maastricht	18	Deep Junior

== See also ==
- ICGA Journal - Academic journal published by the ICGA
- Chess engine
- Computer chess
- Computer Olympiad
- World Computer Speed Chess Championship
- North American Computer Chess Championship
- Chess.com Computer Chess Championship
- Top Chess Engine Championship
