= List of chess software =

Chess software comes in different forms. A chess playing program provides a graphical chessboard on which one can play a chess game against a computer. Such programs are available for personal computers, video game consoles, smartphones/tablet computers or mainframes/supercomputers. A chess engine generates moves, but is accessed via a command-line interface with no graphics. A dedicated chess computer has been purpose built solely to play chess. A graphical user interface (GUI) allows one to import and load an engine, and play against it. A chess database allows one to import, edit, and analyze a large archive of past games.

== Chess engines ==
This list contains only chess engines for which Wikipedia articles exist yet and therefore is very incomplete. It does not reflect or imply current or historic play strength as this characteristic in itself usually does not warrant an entry on Wikipedia.

- Delfi
- Chess Tiger
- Crafty
- CuckooChess
- Deep Fritz
- Dragon
- Fairy-Max
- Fritz
- Fruit
- Ginkgo
- GNU Chess
- HIARCS
- Houdini
- Ikarus
- Jonny
- Junior
- KnightCap
- Komodo
- Leela Chess Zero
- MChess Pro
- Mittens
- Naum
- Rybka
- Shredder
- Sjeng
- SmarThink
- Stockfish
- Torch
- Turochamp
- Zappa

== Chess graphical user interfaces ==
- Chess Assistant
- ChessBase
- Chessmaster
- Fritz
- GNOME Chess
- Hiarcs Chess Explorer
- Lucas Chess
- PyChess
- Shane's Chess Information Database
- Shredder
- Winboard
- XBoard

== Chess-playing programs for personal computers ==
- Apple Chess
- Battle Chess
- Battle vs. Chess
- Bobby Fischer Teaches Chess
- Chess Champion 2175
- Chess Mates
- Chess Player 2150
- Chess Simulator
- Chess Titans
- Chess Ultra
- Chessaria: The Tactical Adventure
- Chessdroid: Offline Chess Analysis
- ChessGenius
- Chessmaster
- ChessV
- Colossus Chess
- Combat Chess
- Cyber Chess
- Fritz and Chesster
- Grandmaster Chess
- Hoyle Majestic Chess
- Kasparov Chessmate
- Kasparov's Gambit
- Lego Chess
- Playchess
- Power Chess
- Pure Chess
- REBEL
- Sargon
- Sega Chess
- Socrates II
- Virtua Chess
- X3D Fritz
- Zillions of Games

== Chess-playing programs for video game consoles ==
- Battle vs. Chess
- Chessmaster
- Clubhouse Games
- Fidelity Ultimate Chess Challenge
- Fritz Chess
- Online Chess Kingdoms
- Pure Chess
- Silver Star Chess
- Video Chess
- Virtual Chess 64
- Virtual Kasparov
- Wii Chess
- Star Wars Chess
- Battle Chess
- War Chess

== Chess apps for phones/tablets ==
- Chess Tiger (iOS)
- Fritz Chess
- HIARCS
- Komodo engine
- Play Magnus
- Pocket Fritz (Pocketpc)
- Shredder
- Stockfish
- Droidfish (Android)

== Chess computers ==
The following are special-purpose hardware/software combinations that are inextricably connected:

- Belle
- ChessMachine
- ChipTest
- Cray Blitz
- Deep Blue
- Deep Thought
- HiTech
- Hydra
- Mephisto
- Saitek

== Programs for reading and editing chess databases ==
- Chess Assistant
- Chess Informant Expert
- ChessBase
- Shane's Chess Information Database
- pgnutil

== Chess-playing programs for mainframes/supercomputers ==
- AlphaZero
- CHAOS (Chess program)
- Chess (Northwestern University)
- CilkChess
- Kaissa
- Kotok-McCarthy
- Mac Hack

== Tiniest chess programs ==
- 1K ZX Chess
- Microchess
- Toledo Nanochess

== See also ==
- Advanced Chess
- Chess software
- Comparison of chess video games
- Computer chess
- Computer Olympiad
- Endgame tablebase
- List of Internet chess servers
- Software for handling chess problems
- Swedish Chess Computer Association
- World Computer Chess Championship
