= Comparison of chess video games =

This is a comparison of chess video games.

== General information ==
	Developer	First release	Latest release	License	Platform
Battle Chess	Interplay; Silicon & Synapse (C64)	1988	1994	Commercial	Windows, Apple II, Classic Mac OS, Amiga, 3DO, Acorn Archimedes, Atari ST, Commodore 64, MS-DOS, FM Towns, NES, PC-98, X68000
Battle Chess: Game of Kings	Interplay	2014	n/a	Commercial	Windows
Battle vs. Chess	Targem Games; Zuxxez Entertainment	2011	n/a	Commercial (Topware Interactive)	Windows, Mac, Nintendo DS, PlayStation 3, PlayStation Portable, Xbox 360, Wii
Chessaria: The Tactical Adventure	Pixel Wizards	2018	n/a	Commercial	Windows, Mac
Chess Assistant	Victor Zakharov	1988	2018	Commercial (Convekta)	Windows
Chessbase	Mathias Wüllenweber, Mathias Feist	1987	2018	Commercial (Chessbase)	Windows, Android
Chessmaster	David Kittinger, Kathe and Dan Spracklen, Johan de Koning	1986	2008	Commercial (Ubisoft)	Various
Chess Titans	Oberon Games	2007	n/a	Included in Windows Vista and 7	Windows Vista, Windows 7
ChessV	Gregory Strong	2009	n/a	GPL	Windows
Combat Chess	Minds Eye Productions	1997	n/a	Commercial	Windows
Fritz	Frans Morsch, Mathias Feist, Gyula Horvath, Vasik Rajlich	1991	2018	Commercial (Chessbase)	Windows, PlayStation 3, Wii, Nintendo DS
Fritz and Chesster	Chessbase	2005	2010	Commercial (Chessbase)	Windows, Mac, Nintendo DS
GNOME Chess	Robert Ancell, GNOME Team	2000	2018	Free	Unix-like
GNU Chess	Stuart Cracraft, John Stanback, Chua Kong-Sian, Fabien Letouzey	1984	2013	Free	Windows, Unix-like
HIARCS	Mark Uniacke	1980	2012	Commercial (Chessbase, Hiarcs.com)	Windows, iOS, Mac, Windows Mobile, Freescale DragonBall, ARM-based Palm OS
Houdini	Robert Houdart	2010	2018	Commercial (Chessbase, Convekta)	Windows
Junior	Amir Ban, Shay Bushinsky	1997	2014	Commercial (Chessbase, Hiarcs.com)	Windows
Komodo	Don Dailey, Larry Kaufman, Mark Lefler	2010	2018	Commercial (Chessbase, Komodochess.com)	Windows, Linux, Mac, Android
Playchess	Chessbase	2003	2018	Commercial (Chessbase)	Windows, web
Play Magnus	Tord Romstad	2014	2018	Free to try with in-app purchases	Android, iOS
Pure Chess	VooFoo Studios	2012	n/a	Commercial (Ripstone)	Windows, Android, iOS, PlayStation 3, PlayStation Vita
pyChess	PyChess Project	2006	2018	GPL	Unix-like Windows
Rybka	Vasik Rajlich	2010		Commercial (Chessbase, rybkachess.com)	Windows
Shredder	Stefan Meyer-Kahlen	1993	2010	Commercial (Chessbase Shredderchess.com)	Windows, Mac, Linux, iPhone, iPad, Android
War Chess	SuperEmpire Interactive	2003	2004	Commercial	Windows, Playstation 2
Wii Chess	Fritz Reul	2008	n/a	Commercial	Wii
Winboard/xBoard	Tim Mann, Harm Geert Muller		2013	Free GPL	Unix-like, X11, Windows

== Gameplay ==
	included chess engine(s)	Can open/save PGN	Can import UCI (Note: Acronym for Universal Chess Interface) engines	Levels	3D or Animated pieces	Variants	Online multiplayer
Aquarium	Crafty, Delfi, Rybka, Spike	Yes	Yes	multivariation, (Note: The GUI will take a second or third best move from the engine.) uci_elo	No	Chess960	No
Battle Chess	n/a	No	No		Yes	No	
Battle Chess: Game of Kings	n/a	No	No		Yes	No	
Battle vs. Chess	Fritz	No	No	levels 1-9	Yes		
Chessaria: The Tactical Adventure	Chessaria AICE	No	No		Yes	Yes	Yes
Chess Assistant	Dragon, Rybka	Yes	Yes	multivariation, uci_elo	No	Chess960	No
Chessbase	Fritz	Yes	Yes	uci_elo for analysis but no timed games	Yes	Chess960	No
Chessmaster	The King	Yes	No	Personalities with Elo ratings	Yes	No	No longer supported
Chess Titans	n/a	No	No	Yes	No	No	
ChessV							
Combat Chess	n/a	Yes			Yes		Yes
Fritz	Rybka, earlier Pandix or Fritz	Yes	Yes	Friend Mode, (Note: The GUI will adjust the level of play during each game based on how well the player is playing.) Handicap and Fun, (Note: The player can select the Elo rating and style that the engine will play.) uci_elo	Yes	Chess960	
Fritz and Chesster	Koenig Schwarz						
GNOME Chess							
GNU Chess	GNU chess	Yes	No		No	Knightmate, Capablanca, Gothic, Shatranj, Courier, Cylinder, Berolina	No
Hiarcs Chess Explorer	Hiarcs	Yes	Yes	uci_elo	No	No	No
Chessbase Houdini	Houdini	Yes	Yes	Friend Mode, Handicap and Fun, uci_elo	Yes	Chess960	Yes
Chessbase Junior	Junior	Yes	Yes	Friend Mode, Handicap and Fun, uci_elo	Yes	Chess960	Yes
Chessbase Komodo	Komodo	Yes	Yes	Friend Mode, Handicap and Fun, uci_elo	Yes	Chess960	Yes
Playchess	none	Yes	No	Other players have Elo rating	No	Chess960	Yes
Play Magnus	Glaurung	Yes	No	can choose Magnus' age	No	No	No
Pure Chess	n/a	No	No		Yes		
pyChess	Pychess engine, Stockfish	Yes	Yes				Yes
Chessbase Rybka	Rybka	Yes	Yes	Friend Mode, Handicap and Fun, uci_elo	Yes	Chess960	Yes
Shredder UCI GUI	Shredder	Yes	Yes	uci_elo	No	Chess960	No
War Chess	n/a	No	No	A slider for windows, 10 levels for Playstation 2	Yes	No	for Windows
Wii Chess	Loop Express	No	No				No longer supported
Winboard/xBoard	Crafty	Yes	via UCI2WB	No	No	Knightmate, Capablanca, Gothic, Shatranj, Courier, Cylinder, Berolina	Yes

== See also ==
- List of chess software
