= Chess database =

A chess database is a database of chess games.

== List of notable chess databases ==
- Chess Assistant
- Chess Informant Expert
- Chess opening book (computers)
- Chess.com
- chess24
- ChessBase
- Lichess
- Shane's Chess Information Database

== See also ==
- Computer chess
- List of chess games
- List of chess software
