= Shane's Chess Information Database =

Software application for viewing and maintaining databases of chess games

Scid
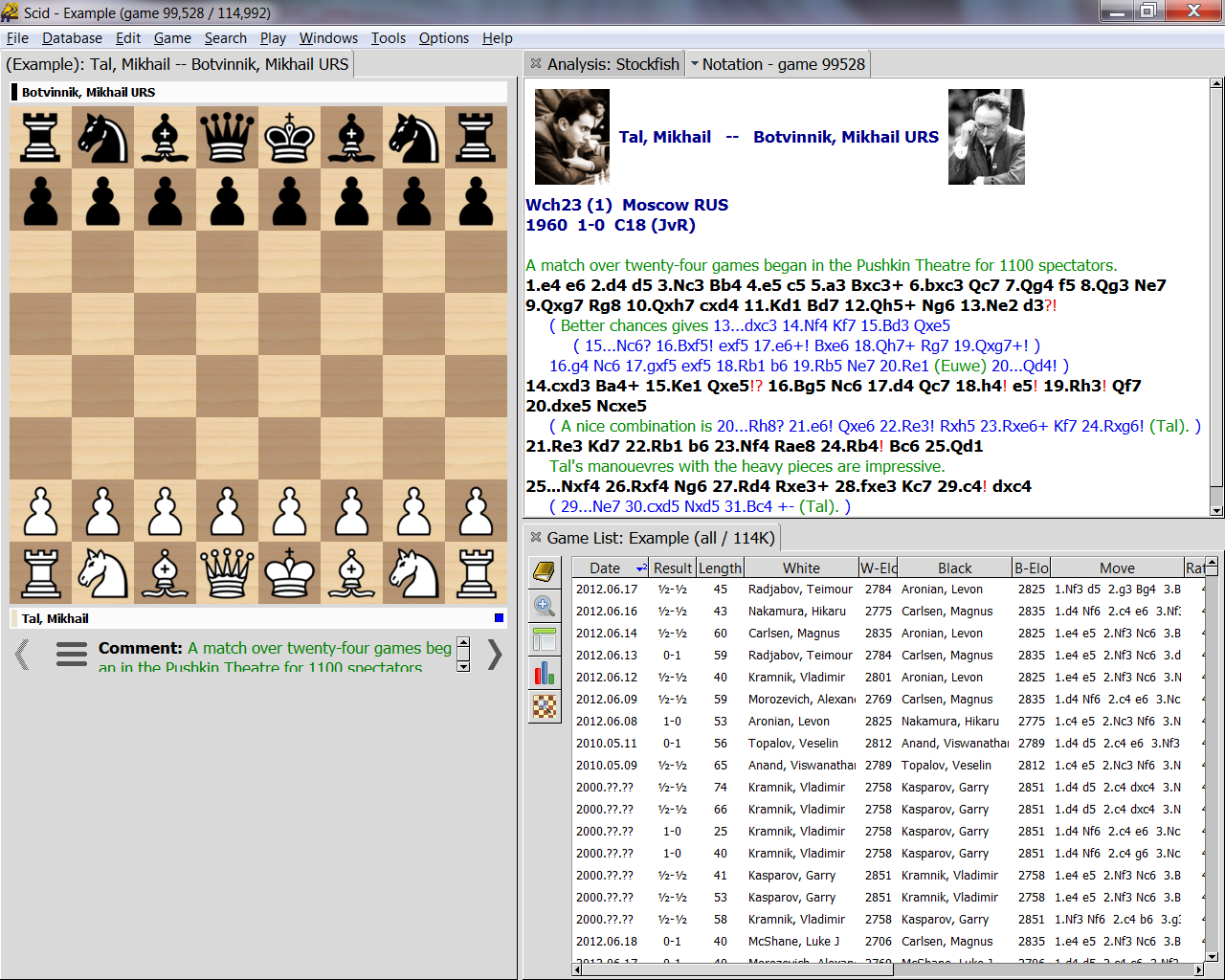
- Scid 4.6.2 on Windows
- Developer: Shane Hudson
- Stable release: 5.1.0 / 21 December 2024; 14 months ago
- Operating system: Windows, Linux, macOS, Solaris, FreeBSD, NetBSD, OpenBSD
- Type: Chess database
- License: GPL
- Website: scid.sourceforge.net
- Repository: sourceforge.net/p/scid/code/ci/master/tree/

Shane's Chess Information Database (Scid) is a free and open source UNIX, Windows, Linux, and Mac application for viewing and maintaining large databases of chess games. It has features comparable to popular commercial chess software. Scid is written in Tcl/Tk and C++.

Scid has undergone several stages of development, firstly by Shane Hudson, then by Pascal Georges.

== Features ==
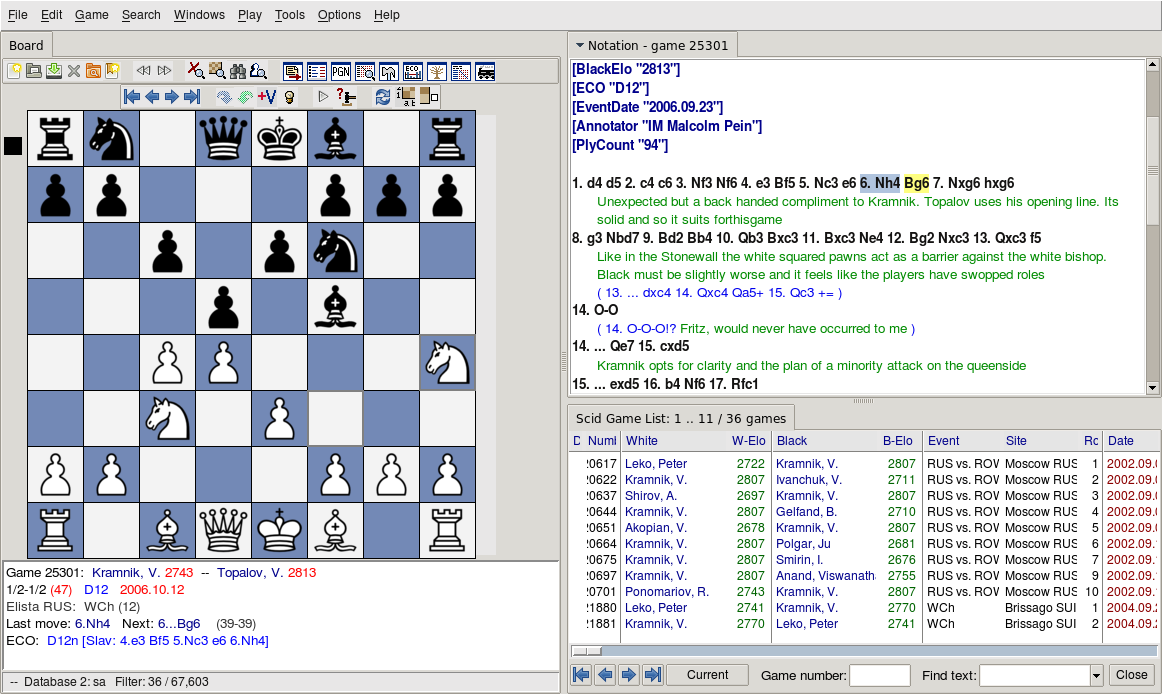
Scid 4.3

Scid is a powerful Chess Toolkit with many features. It can interface with XBoard engines (such as Crafty and GNU Chess), and UCI engines (e.g. Fruit, Rybka and Stockfish). Using Scid, one may play games against human opponents (on the Free Internet Chess Server), or computer opponents. Database features include a Move Tree with statistics, Player Information and Photos, and General Searches for specific endings (e.g. pawn vs. rook or rook vs. queen), positions or players. It has a database with 1.4 million games (ScidBase).

Scid's speed is due to its storing chess games in its own compact database format (si4), but it also supports the popular portable game notation (PGN).

== Related software ==
There are multiple projects related to Scid, all using the si4 database format. ChessDB was the first Scid fork. Scid vs. PC has been in development since 2009, and has an improved interface. Its major new feature is a Computer Tournament mode and also includes rewritten Gamelist, FICS and Analysis widgets. ChessX replaces Tcl/Tk with Qt. Scidb (written in Tcl/C++), implements many chess variants and many read/write formats.

Scid on the go is a browser for Scid database files for Android.

== See also ==
- ChessBase
- Chess engines
- Chess Assistant
- Chess Informant
