= PyChess =

Chess software

- User playing against Crafty
- Developer: The PyChess Project
- Initial release: 13 September 2006; 19 years ago
- Stable release: 1.0.6 / 13 September 2025; 58 days ago
- Written in: Python (PyGTK)
- Operating system: Unix-like, Windows
- Available in: 61 languages
- Type: Computer chess
- License: GNU General Public License 3
- Website: pychess.github.io

PyChess is a free software chess client developed for GNU. It allows users to play offline or online via the Free Internet Chess Server (FICS). PyChess also incorporates a built-in chess engine, which in contrast to most other chess AIs is written in the Python language and focuses more on fun of play than raw strength. For more advanced users, PyChess allows for virtually any other external chess engine to be used with it.

== History ==
Development on PyChess was started by Thomas Dybdahl Ahle in 2006, and the first public release was sent out later that year. The release contained the bare minimum of features to play a game of chess, and was backed only by the GNU Chess engine.

In the end of 2006, PyChess was close to becoming a part of GNOME Games, which were holding a usage survey of aspiring new games to include in the suite. Being nearly just started at the time, it lost to the more established glChess, which managed to fix its hardware accelerating dependency before the end of the trial. glChess is still developed as a part of GNOME today. Afterwards there were talks of the two programs merging, but the developers decided they were targeting different user segments, with PyChess aiming towards more advanced users.

In 2009, PyChess won Les Trophées du Libre in Paris in the category of hobby computing.

PyChess has grown steadily since then, with increasing year-to-year development activity, and would cost more than $500,000 to develop today in terms of the man-hours required to develop such a codebase. By 2011 it was among the seven most frequently used chess clients to access the Free Internet Chess Server, which in turn is the only non-web-based chess server available for Linux.

Version 0.12 of PyChess uses PyGObject and GTK+ 3, prior versions used the obsoleted PyGTK.

== Logo ==
The current PyChess logo was contributed by Karol Kreński in 2007. Karol's original design was very cartoonish, but was modified into a slightly calmer expression.

== Aims ==
According to the PyChess website:

The goal of PyChess is to provide an advanced chess client for Linux, and do that with a nice and efficient user interface in line with the GNOME Human Interface Guidelines. The client should be fun and exciting to those new to chess – who just want to play a short games to procrastinate their work – as well as those who want to utilize their computer for further enhancing their play.

The PyChess project puts heavy emphasis on simplicity, trying to avoid the complicated user interfaces of XBoard and BabasChess. This implies adding new features slowly, so they can be integrated in the overall usage scheme, and make things "just work". At the same time the project strives to contain most of the features known from major Windows chess clients such as Chessbase and Aquarium by ChessOK.

== See also ==
- GNOME Chess
