= Strelka (chess engine) =

Chess engine

- Developer: Yuri Osipov
- Initial release: May 2007; 19 years ago
- Stable release: 5.5 / May 15, 2012; 14 years ago
- Operating system: Windows
- Type: Chess engine
- Website: strelkachess.narod.ru

Strelka (Russian: Стрелка) is a computer chess engine for Windows, developed by Yuri Osipov and released in May 2007. In total five versions of the program have been developed with the latest 5.5 version, released in May 2012, running only on a single processor core. The engine is named after the Soviet space dog of the same name. Strelka's achievements has been considered controversial, due to the disputed originality of its source code.

Strelka has been one of the strongest chess programs in the world according to the rating lists published by "Computerchess.org" and "husvankempen.de", entering the lists in late 2011 and climbing the ranks, taking second place in the 40/4 blitz rating list by December 2011 and seventh place in the 40/40 rating list by April 2012.

After late 2012, Strelka dropped to the fourth place in 40/4, surpassed by the Critter, Komodo, and eventually Stockfish. Strelka fell out of top twelve in 40/40 rating by early 2015.

== Playing strength ==
As of version 5.0, Strelka included 32-bit and 64-bit uniprocessor versions. Strelka 5.5 64-bit had 3197 Elo in the 40/40 computer chess rating list (CCRL) published on April 29, 2012, while in CEGT 40/4 rating Strelka 5.0 x64 1CPU reached its highest 3214 Elo in December 2011.

== History ==
Strelka finished 2nd at the CIS computer chess championship in 2008, behind WildCat.

== Controversy ==
With the initial release of Strelka, chess players on "Rybkaforum" alleged that this engine was a clone of Rybka 1.0 beta—a reverse-engineered and slightly modified version of Rybka. Several players on the forum found Strelka to yield identical analysis to Rybka in a variety of different situations, even having the same bugs and weaknesses in some cases. Osipov, however, repeatedly stated on discussion boards that Strelka was based on Fruit, not Rybka, and that any similarities was either because Rybka was also based on Fruit, or because he had tuned the evaluation function to be as close to Rybka as possible.

After the release of Strelka 2.0 beta in January 2008, source code was included. Vasik Rajlich, the author of Rybka, stated that the source made it "obvious" that Strelka 2.0 beta was indeed a Rybka 1.0 beta clone, although not without some improvements in certain areas. On the basis of this, he claimed the source as his own and intended to re-release it under his own name, although he later decided not to do so. He also made allegations that "Yuri Osipov" was a pen name.

According to Victor Zakharov (Convekta company) in his review for Arena chess website: "I consider that Yuri Osipov (Ivanovich) is his real name. He didn't hide it. However I can't state this with 100% assurance." And he also has some contact with Yuri Osipov for development of mobile platforms chess program.

On Jan 23, 2011, Fabien Letouzey, the author of Fruit, sent a letter to another chess programmer Tord Romstad about Strelka and Rybka, where he expressed an opinion that Strelka 2.0 beta was a Fruit derivate with some minor changes.
