= Naum (chess) =

- Developer: Aleksandar Naumov
- Initial release: April 2004; 22 years ago
- Final release: 4.2
- Operating system: Microsoft Windows, Linux, Pocket PC
- Type: Chess engine
- License: Proprietary
- Website: naumchess.brinkster.net

Naum is a computer chess engine by Canadian programmer Aleksandar Naumov. The last commercial version (4.2) was released in March 2010. The program supports both UCI and Winboard protocols and can therefore be operated under different graphical interfaces. Naum has commercial versions for single and multiple-processor systems, a freeware version (2.0, released September 2006) for single-processor systems, and a version for Palm OS (1.8, released in June 2006). The latest version, 4.6, was also freeware.

== History ==
After Naum tied for first with Rybka in the 2008 Internet Computer Chess Tournament, it did not compete in any other over-the-board (OTB) tournaments. In early 2009, Naum attained second place behind Rybka on chess engine rating lists, such as CCRL In 2012, the development of Naum was discontinued, and it has since only had minor updates. In 2013, Naum participated in the Thoresen Chess Engines Competition and the author released a software patch to enable the engine to run stably with 16 processors. Finally the author released it as freeware.

== Notable games ==
Rybka vs Naum, Chess960CWC 2008

Position: e8 white queen, f6 black queen, g6 black rook, e5 black pawn, f5 black pawn, g5 black king, f4 black pawn, h4 black pawn, d3 white pawn, e3 black pawn, h3 white pawn, g2 white pawn, g1 white rook, h1 white king

Naum's central pawn mass is very strong. 85...Qd6 86. Rf1 and after a long struggle, Rybka finally resigned on move 130.

[Event "Chess960CWC 2008"]
[Site "Mainz"]
[Date "2008.07.30"]
[Round "6"]
[White "Rybka 3 "]
[Black "Naum 3.1"]
[Result "0–1"]
[Variant "chess 960"]
[SetUp "1"]
[FEN "nnbbqrkr/pppppppp/8/8/8/8/PPPPPPPP/NNBBQRKR w HFhf - 0 1"]

{SP 037} 1. Nb3 d6 2. e4 Nb6 3. f4 h5 4. h3 e5 5. fxe5 dxe5 6. d3 Be7 7. Nc3 Nc6 8. Be3 Qd8 9. Qd2 Nd4 10. Ne2 c5 11. c3 Ne6 12. c4 Qd6 13. Nc3 Bd7 14. Na5 Qc7 15. Kh2 Nd4 16. Rhg1 g6 17. Nb3 Kg7 18. Kh1 h4 19. Re1 f5 20. Bf2 f4 21. Nxd4 cxd4 22. Nd5 Nxd5 23. exd5 Bf5 24. Bf3 a5 25. Qe2 Bd6 26. Bg4 b6 27. Rc1 Qd7 28. Bxf5 gxf5 29. Rge1 Rfg8 30. Rb1 Ra8 31. Qc2 Ra6 32. Re2 Ra7 33. Rbe1 Qc7 34. Qa4 Kg6 35. Kg1 Kg5 36. Rf1 Rb7 37. Qc2 b5 38. b3 a4 39. Qc1 bxc4 40. bxc4 a3 41. Rc2 Bc5 42. Qa1 Qb8 43. Qd1 Rhh7 44. Re2 Rb2 45. Rfe1 Re7 46. Rf1 Reb7 47. Rc2 Rb1 48. Rc1 R1b4 49. Qe1 Qh8 50. Ra1 Rb2 51. Qa5 Bb4 52. Qa6 Rg7 53. Kh1 Rg8 54. Qa4 Bc3 55. Rac1 Qg7 56. Qd1 Rxa2 57. Qf3 Rb2 58. Rg1 a2 59. c5 Bd2 60. Ra1 Be3 61. Bxe3 dxe3 62. d6 Qf7 63. c6 Qe6 64. d7 Rf2 65. Rac1 Qd6 66. Qd1 a1=Q 67. Rxa1 Qxc6 68. Ra7 Kh6 69. d8=Q Rxd8 70. Qa1 Qf6 71. Qa3 Re8 72. Qc5 Rg8 73. Rc7 Rg6 74. Rc8 Rb2 75. Rf8 Rc2 76. Qa3 Qd6 77. Rh8+ Kg5 78. Qa8 Rc6 79. Qa7 Rc7 80. Qa1 Qf6 81. Re8 Re7 82. Rd8 Ra7 83. Qxa7 Qxd8 84. Qf7 Qf6 85. Qe8 Qd6 86. Rf1 Rg7 87. Qh8 Rd7 88. Re1 Qf6 89. Qg8+ Qg7 90. Qb3 Rd8 91. Qa3 Qf8 92. Qb3 Qd6 93. Qb7 Qd7 94. Qb4 Qc7 95. Qa3 Rc8 96. Qa2 Qc3 97. Rg1 Qc6 98. Qa7 Qc7 99. Qa6 Qd7 100. Qa1 Qd4 101. Qa2 Rd8 102. Qe6 Qd6 103. Qc4 Qxd3 104. Qc7 Kf6 105. Ra1 Rd7 106. Qc8 e2 107. Qf8+ Kg5 108. Qg8+ Kh5 109. Qh8+ Kg6 110. Qe8+ Kg7 111. Rg1 Kf6 112. Qh8+ Ke6 113. Qh5 Qd1 114. Qe8+ Kd6 115. Qb8+ Kd5 116. Qb4 Ke6 117. Qa5 Qd2 118. Qa1 Kf6 119. Qa6+ Rd6 120. Qc8 e1=Q 121. Qf8+ Ke6 122. Qe8+ Kd5 123. Rxe1 Qxe1+ 124. Kh2 f3 125. gxf3 Qg3+ 126. Kh1 Qxf3+ 127. Kh2 Qe2+ 128. Kg1 Qd1+ 129. Kh2 Ke4 130. Qg8 0–1
