= Power Chess =

1996 video game

- Developer: Sierra On-Line
- Publisher: Sierra On-Line
- Platform: Microsoft Windows 95
- Release: September 30, 1996
- Genre: Chess
- Mode: Single player

Power Chess is a chess-playing video game originally released in September 1996 by Sierra On-Line for the Microsoft Windows 95 operating system. Later revisions of the software were released as Power Chess 98 (1997) and Power Chess 2.0 (1998). Power Chess was also the "intermediate" game included in Sierra's Complete Chess (1998) along with Maurice Ashley Teaches Chess (1995) and Extreme Chess (1996).

== Engine ==
Its chess engine is "Wchess" by David Kittinger, which played against Deep Blue in the 1995 World Computer Championship in Hong Kong. The game is included as a watchable "Great Game" in Power Chess.

== Gameplay ==
Power Chess had two major innovations: the program would adjust its level from game to game trying to match that of the player (presaging Chessbase Fritz's Friend Mode). In addition, after each game, a female voice, the Queen, walks the player through the game, pointing out and explaining where the player could have played better. The program keeps track of the player's rating. Players can also create their own characters with differing gameplay styles and difficulty.

== Narration ==
The voice of the Power Chess Queen was voiced in English and French by voiceover artist Natacha LaFerriere.

== "Great Games" ==
A collection of famous games is included for review and study, each one narrated turn-by-turn by the Queen. The games include:

- The Evergreen Game, Adolf Anderssen vs. Jean Dufresne (1852)
- The Opera Game, Paul Morphy vs. Duke Karl of Brunswick and Count Isouard (1858)
- Wilhelm Steinitz vs. Curt von Bardeleben (1895)
- Ruger vs. Gebhard (1915)
- Vasily Smyslov vs. Bobby Fischer (1970)
- Wchess vs. Deep Blue (1995)
- Deep Blue vs. Garry Kasparov, Game 1 (1996)

== Reception ==
Power Chess won Computer Games Strategy Plus's award for the 1996 "traditional" game of the year.

In a comparison between four chess programs, PC Joker rated Power Chess the highest.

== See also ==
Comparison of chess video games
