= Delfi (chess) =

Delfi is a Winboard/UCI chess engine written in Pascal designed by Italian chess programmer Fabio Cavicchio. It is designed to emulate a human playing style and is rated 2627 on the Chess Engines Grand Tournament. The latest released version is 5.4. Source code for version 5.1 is available.

== Technical details ==
From its release page, Delfi does not use bitboards like Crafty, but uses 16 × 16 array of bytes for board presentation. It uses capture history heuristic and smart thinking time allocation, from 50% to 400% of the average time. When some moves seem equal in its evaluation, it makes random moves.

== See also ==
- Computer chess
- World Computer Speed Chess Championship
