= Play Magnus =

Play Magnus may refer to:

- Play Magnus Group, a Norwegian chess company co-founded by Magnus Carlsen
- Play Magnus (mobile app), a computer chess mobile app developed by Play Magnus Group
