= Critter =

Critter may refer to:

- Critter (chess), a Slovak chess engine
- Critters (cellular automaton)
- Critters (comics), an anthology comic book published by Fantagraphics Books
- Critters (film series)
  - Critters (film), the first film in the series
- Fearsome critters, legendary monsters said to live in North America
- The Critters, an American pop group
- The mascot and call sign of ValuJet Airlines
- A fan of the popular Dungeons and Dragons series Critical Role

== See also ==
- Little Critter, a series of children's books by Mercer Mayer
