= Nolot (surname) =

Nolot is a surname. Notable people with the surname include:

- Benjamin Nolot (born 1976), American documentary filmmaker
- Jacques Nolot (born 1943), French actor, screenwriter, and film director
- Lauriane Nolot (born 1998), French kitesurfer
- Pierre Nolot (1945-2026), French journalist, expert in computer chess
