= IPPOLIT =

Open-source chess program

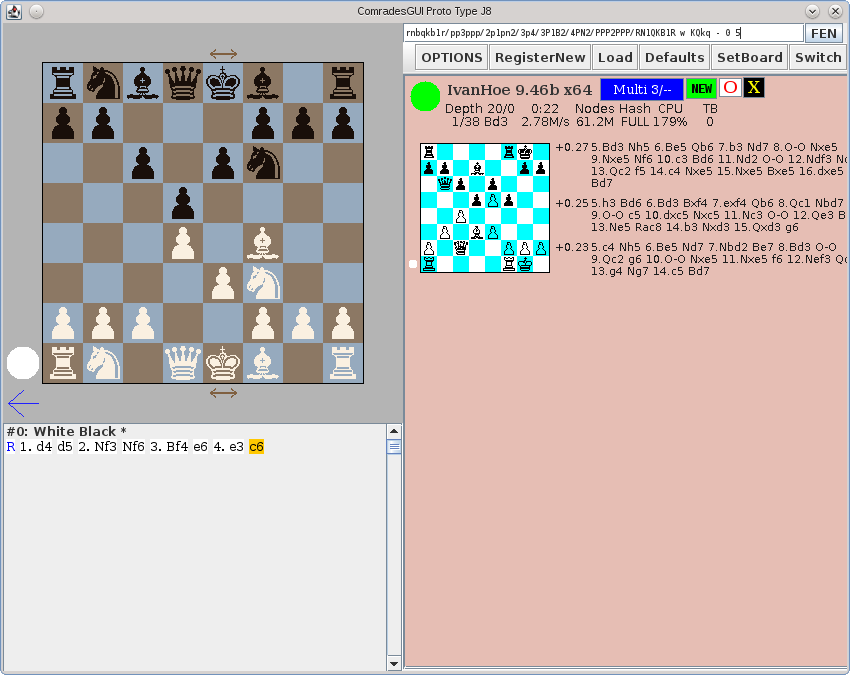
- IvanHoe analyzing a position with multi-pv enabled using ComradesGUI
- Developer: Unknown
- Initial release: 2 May 2009; 16 years ago
- Preview release: 999946h (IvanHoe) / 8 December 2011; 14 years ago
- Written in: C
- Operating system: Linux, Windows
- Type: Chess program
- License: Public Domain
- Website: ippolit.wikispaces.com

IPPOLIT is an open-source chess program released by authors using pseudonyms, Yakov Petrovich Golyadkin, Igor Igorovich Igoronov, Roberto Pescatore, Yusuf Ralf Weisskopf, Ivan Skavinsky Skavar, and Decembrists.

The program is a console application that communicates with a chess graphical user interface (GUI) via standard Universal Chess Interface protocol. IPPOLIT is a bitboard chess engine optimized for 64-bit architecture with native support for both 32-bit/64-bit Linux and Windows operating systems. With about 3100 ELO it is listed in TOP 50 strongest chess programs.

== Releases ==
- IPPOLIT, released on May 2, 2009, was the first release of the series. It was split in multiple usenet messages.
- RobboLito, released in September 2009, was the second installment of the IPPOLIT series. Endgame tablebase, RobboBases support was introduced.
- Igorrit, released in January 2010, added Multi-core support, and was the third installment of the IPPOLIT series.
- IvanHoe, released in January 2010, is the fourth and current project code name of the IPPOLIT series. It features, but not limited to, Multi-PV, Monte-Carlo Tree Search, and Chess960. IvanHoe uses a decrementing versioning scheme. The latest release includes source-code for a Java GUI, ComradesGUI.

== Controversy ==
IPPOLIT was initially prohibited from many computer chess websites after the author of the chess engine Rybka claimed it to be a clone of his program. IPPOLIT authors have denied the accusation. Even today, some chess rating lists still refuse to include it in their lists of tested programs.
