= Houdini (chess) =

UCI chess engine

- Developer: Robert Houdart
- Initial release: May 15, 2010; 15 years ago
- Stable release: 6.03 / November 20, 2017; 8 years ago
- Operating system: Microsoft Windows
- Type: Chess engine
- License: Proprietary
- Website: www.cruxis.com/chess/houdini.htm

Houdini is a UCI chess engine developed by Belgian programmer Robert Houdart. It is a derivative of open-source engines IPPOLIT/RobboLito, Stockfish, and Crafty. Versions up to 1.5a are available for non-commercial use, while 2.0 and later are commercial only.

== Playing style ==
Chess commentator and video annotator CM Tryfon Gavriel compared Houdini's playing style to that of the Romantic Era of chess, where an attacking, sacrificial style was predominant. According to Robert Houdart, Houdini's advantage against other top engines is in its handling of piece mobility, which is why it "favors aggressive play that tries to win the game".

== Version history ==
| Version | Release date | Features |
|---|---|---|
| 1.0 | May 15, 2010 | First release |
| 1.01 | June 1, 2010 | Bug fixes, improved search algorithm |
| 1.02 | June 18, 2010 | SMP and hash collision bug fixes. Work-around for Shredder GUI. |
| 1.03 | July 15, 2010 | Multi-PV, searchmove and large page support. Improved evaluation function. |
| 1.03a | July 17, 2010 | Bug fix for Multi-PV |
| 1.5 | December 15, 2010 | Improved search and evaluation. Gaviota Table Base Support. |
| 1.5a | January 15, 2011 | Maintenance update with work-arounds for Fritz GUI and other minor improvements. |
| 2.0 | September 1, 2011 | First commercial release. Improved analysis capabilities, enhanced search and evaluation. Houdini Pro version for high-end users with powerful hardware (multi-core support). Chess960 support. Strength limit feature. Position learning. Save hash to file, load hash from file, never clear hash. |
| 2.0b | November 7, 2011 | Maintenance update with minor bug corrections and Nalimov EGTB support. |
| 2.0c | November 20, 2011 | Maintenance update with minor bug corrections and new analysis options. MultiPV_cp option to limit multi-PV analysis to moves within a range of the best move. FiftyMoveDistance option to make the 50-move rule kick in earlier. UCI_Elo and UCI_LimitStrength options as UCI standard-compliant alternative to Strength option. Exit on detection with GUI exit. |
| 3.0 | October 15, 2012 | Major new version. Improved search and evaluation (+50 Elo), Tactical Mode, Scorpio bitbases, accelerated Principal Variation Search "Smart Fail-High", optimized hash usage. |
| 4.0 | November 25, 2013 | Major new version. Improved search and evaluation (+50 Elo), 6-men Syzygy table bases (coding provided by Ronald de Man) |
| 5.0 | November 7, 2016 | Major new version, about 200 Elo stronger. Rewritten evaluation function, deeper search. |
| 5.01 | November 15, 2016 | Maintenance update with some interface corrections and improvements. |
| 6.0 | September 15, 2017 | Major new version. Improved search and evaluation (+50-60 Elo), enhanced multi-threading. |
| 6.01 | September 24, 2017 | Maintenance update with Nalimov EGTB correction and new output option. |
| 6.02 | October 1, 2017 | Maintenance update with Polyglot book support. |
| 6.03 | November 20, 2017 | Correction for incorrect detection of stalemate in positions with white pawn capture moves. |

The latest stable release of Houdini comes in two versions: Houdini 6 Standard and Houdini 6 Pro. Houdini 6 Pro supports up to 128 processor cores, 128 GB of RAM (hash) and is NUMA-aware, Houdini 5 Standard only supports up to 8 processor cores, 4 GB of hash and is not NUMA-aware. As with many other UCI engines, Houdini comes with no GUI, so a chess GUI is needed for running the engine. Houdini 5 uses calibrated evaluations in which engine scores correlate directly with the win expectancy in the position.

== Controversies ==
Houdini has had a history of allegations against it that it contains code from other engines.

Houdini 1.0 has been alleged to be an IPPOLIT derivative, and to have plagiarized from Rybka, which initially led to Houdini 1.0 to not be tested in any rating lists such as CCRL and CEGT.

Houdini 5.0 and Houdini 6.0 have been alleged to be Stockfish 8 derivatives without providing the sources on request, and thus, violating the GPL license. This has resulted in TCEC revoking Houdini's championship results, and disallowing Houdini from competing. Leaked source code has seemingly been shown to produce almost identical play to Houdini 5.0 and Houdini 6.0, while containing direct references to Stockfish in the code documentation.

On 20 July 2021, the Stockfish team announced legal action against ChessBase alleging that Houdini 6 and Fat Fritz 2 were in violation of the GNU General Public License. As part of the settlement agreement, ChessBase has conceded the allegations. Houdini 6.0 is also no longer available on ChessBase's website as a result.

== Competition results ==
Houdini used to be one of the most successful engines in TCEC, with three championship wins to date, but since season 18 it no longer participates in TCEC due to plagiarized code (see Controversies).

=== Notable games ===
- TCEC Houdini - Rybka Match 2011 · Queen Pawn Game: London System (D02) · 1–0 Houdini plays a pawn sacrifice on move 43.
