= SmarThink =

Chess engine

SmarThink is a computer chess engine written in C++ by Russian computer programmer Sergei Markoff. The latest version, SmarThink 1.98, has been released in January 2018.

SmarThink is promoted as an engine with aggressive attacking style. SmarThink became a Russian computer chess champion in 2004 and CIS computer chess champion in 2005. It was placed 3rd in the 2008 Commonwealth championship, behind WildCat and Strelka.
