= Critter (chess) =

- Developer: Richard Vida
- Stable release: 1.6a / June 2012
- Written in: C++
- Operating system: Microsoft Windows, Mac OS X, Linux, Android
- Type: Chess engine
- License: Proprietary
- Website: www.vlasak.biz/critter/

Critter is a cross-platform UCI chess engine by Slovak programmer Richard Vida which is free for non-commercial use. The engine has achieved top five on most chess engine Elo rating lists.

== History ==
Richard Vida started working on Critter in late 2008. The first version was originally written in Object Pascal but the code was later converted to C++ using Bitboard technology because Delphi did not perform well under 64-bit processors. Critter had its over-the-board (OTB) debut at the ICT 2012, where it became a strong runner-up behind the Rybka cluster.

== Notable games ==
Tornado vs Critter,
nTCEC S2, Stage 2, 3.6

Position: d8 black queen, f8 black rook, g8 black king, a7 white queen, e7 black pawn, f7 black pawn, g7 black bishop, h7 black pawn, f6 black knight, g6 black pawn, f5 black bishop, d4 black rook, e3 white pawn, g3 white pawn, a2 white pawn, b2 white pawn, d2 white knight, f2 white pawn, g2 white bishop, h2 white pawn, a1 white rook, c1 white bishop, e1 white king, h1 white rook

Here Critter played 16...Ng4, sacrificing a rook for a strong attack.
- Tornado vs Critter, nTCEC S2, Stage 2, 3.7, 0–1 Critter sacs two pawns and the exchange to build up a strong attack.
- Toga vs Critter, nTCEC S2, Stage 2, 4.6, 0–1
