= Combat Chess =

1997 video game

- Developer: Minds Eye Productions
- Publisher: Empire Interactive
- Platform: Windows
- Release: October 1997
- Genre: Turn-based strategy
- Modes: Single-player, multiplayer

Combat Chess is a video game version of chess developed by Minds Eye Productions and published by Empire Interactive for Windows in October 1997.

== Gameplay ==
Combat Chess follows the same rules as traditional chess, with pieces moving in an animated fashion and battles playing out so that the capturing piece defeats its target.

The game's options for the computer opponent include how much processing power it will use and how long it takes to ponder the move. The game's other features includes the ability to create your own tutorials, setting up the board to recreate famous matches, and being able to load PGN files from other chess programs. Camera can be set to either 3D or 2D view. Multiplayer options include serial, modem, IPX, and TCP/IP.

== Reception ==
Reception

Review scores
Publication	Score
Computer Games Strategy Plus	3.5/5
GameSpot	6.2/10
GameStar	69%
CD-Action	7/10
PC Action	80% (single-player); 85% (multiplayer)
PC Player (DE)	65/100
Pelit	70/100
Reset	6/10

Combat Chess received generally average reviews. The game was often compared to Interplay's Battle Chess from 1988.

GameSpot called the battle animations a novelty that quickly wears off. Pelit said the graphics were not good and the camera perspective was hiding smaller pieces behind larger ones. It was recommended to instead download the free GNU Chess. Computer Games Magazine also had difficulty with the 3D view.
