= Fritz Chess =

2009 video game

- Developer: Freedom Factory Studios (Note: DS version developed by Shanblue Interactive. Mobile version developed by PlayWay.)
- Publisher: Deep Silver (Note: Mobile version published by Gammick Entertainment.)
- Series: Fritz
- Platforms: Nintendo DS, PlayStation 3, Wii
- Release: iOS; April 17, 2009; Wii: NA/EU: July 10, 2009; Nintendo DS: EU: July 10, 2009; NA: July 13, 2009; PlayStation 3: EU: July 31, 2009
- Genre: Computer chess
- Modes: Single-player, multiplayer

Fritz Chess is a video game for the Wii, Nintendo DS, and PlayStation 3 developed by Freedom Factory Studios and published by Deep Silver in 2009. A mobile port bearing the same name was developed by PlayWay and published by Gammick Entertainment and released the same year. It includes single player and multiplayer modes (for up to two players) and allows user to partake in various chess games, including classic chess, chess 960 or giveaway.

== Gameplay ==
The game is based upon the Fritz chess program and allows the user to establish and maintain an ELO score within the game when playing classic chess against a computer opponent.

== Perceived rarity ==
The North American release of Fritz Chess was quite limited and has fueled speculation that it may be the rarest Wii release in the region. Copies on Amazon and other retailers can run above $100. It was later revealed that Fritz Chess had a limited run on all console releases including the PlayStation 3 and Nintendo DS due to Deep Silver specifically developing the console version for those who wanted to learn to play chess competitively. The Fritz Chess series has another DS release "Learn to Play with Fritz and Chesster" which has assumed similar rarity.
