= Nolot =

Chess test suite

- Type: Chess test suite
- Creator: Pierre Nolot
- Purpose: Evaluation of chess engines
- Introduced: 1980s
- Number of positions: 11
- Subject: Difficult tactical chess problems
- Published in: Gambisco
- Used for: Testing tactical strength of chess programs
- Notability: Positions originally considered unsolvable by chess computers

Nolot is a chess test suite with 11 positions from real games. They were compiled by Pierre Nolot (French: [nɔ.lo]) for the French chess magazine Gambisco and posted on the rec.games.chess Usenet group in 1994. They were designed to be particularly hard for chess engines to solve at the time, although modern engines can find a solution near-instantaneously.

== Problem 1 ==
FEN: r3qb1k/1b4p1/p2pr2p/3n4/Pnp1N1N1/6RP/1B3PP1/1B1QR1K1 w - - 0 1

Problem 1
Kasparov–Karpov, 1990
(game 20)

Position: a8 black rook, e8 black queen, f8 black bishop, h8 black king, b7 black bishop, g7 black pawn, a6 black pawn, d6 black pawn, e6 black rook, h6 black pawn, d5 black knight, a4 white pawn, b4 black knight, c4 black pawn, e4 white knight, g4 white knight, g3 white rook, h3 white pawn, b2 white bishop, f2 white pawn, g2 white pawn, b1 white bishop, d1 white queen, e1 white rook, g1 white king

White to play: 26.Nxh6!!

26.Nxh6!! c3 (26... Rxh6 27.Nxd6 Qh5 (best) 28.Rg5! Qxd1 29.Nf7+ Kg8 30.Nxh6+ Kh8 31.Rxd1 c3 32.Nf7+ Kg8 33.Bg6! Nf4 34.Bxc3 Nxg6 35.Bxb4 Kxf7 36.Rd7+ Kf6 37.Rxg6+ Kxg6 38.Rxb7 ±) 27.Nf5! cxb2 28.Qg4 Bc8 (28... g6!? 29.Kh2! 29.Qd7 30.Nh4 Bc6 31.Nc5! dxc 32.Rxe6 Nf6 33.Nxg6+ Kg7 34.Qg5 Nbd5 35.Ne5 Kh8 36.Nxd7 ±) 29.Qh4+ Rh6 30.Nxh6 gxh6 31.Kh2! Qe5 32.Ng5 Qf6 33.Re8 Bf5 34.Qxh6 (missing a mate in 6: 34.Nf7+ Qxf7 35.Qxh6+ Bh7 36.Rxa8 Nf6 37.Rxf8 Qxf8 38.Qxf8+ Ng8 39.Qg7#) 34...Qxh6 35.Nf7+ Kh7 36.Bxf5+ Qg6 37.Bxg6+ Kg7 38.Rxa8 Be7 39.Rb8 a5 40.Be4+ Kxf7 41.Bxd5+ 1–0

The best Novag computer, the Diablo 68000, finds 26. Nxh6 after seven and a half months (Pierre Nolot has let it run on the position for 14 months and one day, until a power failure stopped an analysis of over 80,000,000,000 nodes.) but for wrong reasons: it evaluates white's position as inferior and thinks this move would enable it to draw.

Today Gambit Tiger 2.0 for example can find it quite quickly: Most free engines running on 64-bit processors in 2010 could solve this problem and the others in a few seconds.

1.Qd4 c3 2.Bxc3 Nxc3 3.Qxb4 Nxe4 4.Qxb7 Rb8 5.Qxb8 Qxb8 6.Bxe4 d5 7.Rb1
∓ (-1.20) Depth: 12 00:00:09 6055 kN
1.Nxh6 c3 2.Nf5 cxb2 3.Qg4 Rb8 4.Nxg7 Rg6 5.Qxg6 Qxg6 6.Rxg6 Bxg7 7.Nxd6
⩱ (-0.48) Depth: 12 00:00:21 14368 kN
1.Nxh6 c3 2.Nf5 cxb2 3.Qg4 Rc8 4.Nxg7 Rg6 5.Nxe8 Rxg4 6.Rxg4 Rxe8 7.Rg6
∓ (-0.74) Depth: 13 00:00:55 38455 kN
1.Ne3 Rxe4 2.Bxe4 Qxe4 3.Nxd5 Qxd5 4.Qc1 Qf5 5.Qxh6+ Qh7 6.Qe6 Nd3 7.Re2 Nxb2 8.Rxb2
⩱ (-0.58) Depth: 13 00:01:30 62979 kN
1.Ne3 Rxe4
⩱ (-0.58) Depth: 14 00:02:02 84941 kN
1.Ne3 Nxe3 2.Rexe3 Bxe4 3.Qg4 Rg6 4.Qxe4 Qxe4 5.Bxe4 Rxg3 6.Rxg3 d5 7.Bf5 Re8 8.Bc3
⩱ (-0.30) Depth: 15 00:03:05 128968 kN
1.Nxh6
⩲ (0.32) Depth: 15 00:07:58 350813 kN
With the next ply showing a clear advantage.

Stockfish 14dev 64bit 4CPU running on 2020 hardware recognises the significance of Nxh6!! in 1 second. Stockfish_21092606_x64_avx2: NNUE evaluation using nn-13406b1dcbe0.nnue enabled.

19/32	00:01	    7708k	4882k	+3,00	Nxh6 Rxh6 Nxd6 Qh5 Bg6 Qxd1 Nf7+ Kg8 Nxh6+ gxh6 Bh5+ Kh7 Rxd1 c3 Bxc3 Nxc3 Rd7+ Kh8 Rxb7 Ne4 Re3 Nxf2 Kxf2 Bc5 Ke2 Bxe3 Kxe3 Nd5+ Kf2
49/73	15:02	 5118270k	5673k	+6,15	Nxh6 Rxh6 Nxd6 Qh5 Rg5 Qxd1 Nf7+ Kg8 Nxh6+ Kh8 Rxd1 c3 Nf7+ Kg8 Bg6 Nf4 Bxc3 Nbd5 Rb1 Bc6 Bd2 Nxg6 Rxg6 Ne7 Rxc6 Nxc6 Rb6 Rc8 Ng5 a5 Ra6 Bb4 Be3 Ne5 Bd4 Nc6 Bb6 Bd2 h4 Kf8 Bc5+ Kg8 Be3 Bxe3 fxe3 Kf8 Kf2 Ke7 Nf3 Kd7 Rb6 Ne7 Rb5 Kd6 Rxa5 Rc2+ Kg3 Re2 Nd4 Rxe3+ Kf4 Rd3 Nf5+ Kc7 Nxe7

== Problem 2 ==
FEN: r4rk1/pp1n1p1p/1nqP2p1/2b1P1B1/4NQ2/1B3P2/PP2K2P/2R5 w - - 0 1

Problem 2
Bronstein–Ljubojevic,
Petropolis izt 1973

Position: a8 black rook, f8 black rook, g8 black king, a7 black pawn, b7 black pawn, d7 black knight, f7 black pawn, h7 black pawn, b6 black knight, c6 black queen, d6 white pawn, g6 black pawn, c5 black bishop, e5 white pawn, g5 white bishop, e4 white knight, f4 white queen, b3 white bishop, f3 white pawn, a2 white pawn, b2 white pawn, e2 white king, h2 white pawn, c1 white rook

White to play: 22.Rxc5!!

22.Rxc5!! Nxc5 23.Nf6+ Kh8 24.Qh4 Qb5+ (computers think there is perpetual check here, but...) 25.Ke3! 25... h5 26.Nxh5 Qxb3+ (26... d5+ 27.Bxd5 Qd3 28.Kf2 Ne4+ 29.Bxe4 Qd4+ 30.Kg2 Qxb2+ 31.Kh3 ±) and White won in 41 moves.

Today Deep Junior 8.ZX for example finds it very quickly (around 1 minute):

1.Kd1 Rac8 2.Bh6 Qb5 3.Rc3 Qf1+ 4.Kc2 Rc6 5.Bxf8
−+ (-2.11) Depth: 12 00:00:04 10422 kN
1.Nxc5 Nxc5 2.Rxc5 Qxc5 3.e6 Rae8 4.e7 Nc8 5.Kf1 Nxd6 6.Bf6 b5
−+ (-2.10) Depth: 12 00:00:14 25054 kN
1.Bf6!
μ (-1.35) Depth: 12 00:00:17 34601 kN
1.Bf6 Qb5+ 2.Ke1 Bb4+ 3.Kf2 Bc5+
= (0.00) Depth: 12 00:00:20 34601 kN
1.Bf6 Qb5+ 2.Ke1 Nxf6 3.Nxf6+ Kg7 4.Nh5+ gxh5 5.Qf6+ Kg8 6.Qg5+ Kh8 7.Qf6+
= (0.00) Depth: 15 00:01:01 130544 kN
1.Rxc5!
= (0.15) Depth: 15 00:01:12 145875 kN
1.Rxc5 Nxc5 2.Nf6+ Kh8 3.Qh4 Qb5+ 4.Ke3 h5 5.Nxh5 Qd3+ 6.Kf2 Ne4+ 7.fxe4 Qd4+ 8.Kf1 Qd3+ 9.Ke1 Qb1+ 10.Bd1
± (2.18) Depth: 15 00:01:18 145875 kN

Stockfish 14dev 64bit 4CPU running on 2020 hardware recognises the significance of Rxc5!! in 1 second.

Stockfish_21092606_x64_avx2: NNUE evaluation using nn-13406b1dcbe0.nnue enabled.

21/25	00:01	   5822k	5545k	+6,61	Rxc5 Qxc5 Nxc5 Nxc5 Bh6 Nbd7 Bxf8 Rxf8 Qe3 Rc8 f4 Nxe5 Qxe5 Ne6 Bxe6 Rc2+ Kd3 Rxh2
46/86	11:27	 5057055k	7355k	+7,61	Rxc5 Qxc5 Nxc5 Nxc5 Bf6 Ne6 Qh6 Nd4+ Kf2 Nf5 Qg5 Nd7 h4 Nxf6 Qxf6 Ng7 d7 b5 Bd5 Rab8 b4 Nh5 Bxf7+ Rxf7 d8R+ Rxd8 Qxd8+ Rf8 Qd5+ Kg7 e6 Kf6 Qd7 Ng7 Qd4+ Kxe6 Qxg7 Rf7 Qc3 Ke7 Qc5+ Ke8 Qc8+ Ke7 h5 gxh5 Kg3 h4+ Kh2 h6 Qc5+ Kf6 Qxb5 Kg7 f4 Rxf4 Qe5+ Rf6 b5 h3 Qd4 Kg8 Qxf6 h5

Blacks 22...Nxc5 is suboptimal and leads to a faster mate

77/44	09:18	 6987714k	12518k	+M22	Nf6+ Kh8 Qh4 Qb5+ Ke3 Qxb3+ axb3 h5 Nxh5 Nd5+ Kd4 Ne6+ Kxd5 Nxg5 Qxg5 gxh5 f4 Rad8 f5 f6 Qxh5+ Kg7 Qg6+ Kh8 e6 b6 e7 Rb8 exf8Q+ Rxf8 Ke6 b5 Ke7 Rb8 Qh5+ Kg7 Qf7+ Kh8 Kxf6 Rf8 Qxf8+ Kh7 Qg7+

== Problem 3 ==
FEN: r2qk2r/ppp1b1pp/2n1p3/3pP1n1/3P2b1/2PB1NN1/PP4PP/R1BQK2R w KQkq - 0 1

Problem 3
Smagin–Sahovic, Biel 1990

Position: a8 black rook, d8 black queen, e8 black king, h8 black rook, a7 black pawn, b7 black pawn, c7 black pawn, e7 black bishop, g7 black pawn, h7 black pawn, c6 black knight, e6 black pawn, d5 black pawn, e5 white pawn, g5 black knight, d4 white pawn, g4 black bishop, c3 white pawn, d3 white bishop, f3 white knight, g3 white knight, a2 white pawn, b2 white pawn, g2 white pawn, h2 white pawn, a1 white rook, c1 white bishop, d1 white queen, e1 white king, h1 white rook

White to play: 12.Nxg5!!

12.Nxg5!! Bxd1 13.Nxe6 Qb8 14.Nxg7+!! Kf8 15.Bh6! Bg4 16.0-0+ Kg8 17.Rf4 ±

White wins with a queen sac but black has defensive resources.

Stockfish 8 64bit 3CPU running on 2016 hardware recognizes the significance of Nxg5!! in 55 seconds.

Stockfish 14 dev (Stockfish_21092606_x64_avx2) 64bit 4CPU running on 2020 hardware recognizes the significance of Nxg5!! in 1 second.

NNUE evaluation using nn-13406b1dcbe0.nnue enabled.

21/34	00:01	 8291k		4530k	+2,78	Nxg5 Bxd1 Nxe6 Qb8 Nxg7+ Kd8 Kxd1 b5 N3f5 Bf8 Rf1 Kc8 Nh5 Kb7 Bxb5 Ne7 g4 a6 Ba4 Nxf5 gxf5 Ka7 Nf4 c5
47/59	37:49	 10390430k	4578k	+3,16	Nxg5 Bxd1 Nxe6 Qb8 Nxg7+ Kd8 Kxd1 b5 Rf1 Kc8 N3f5 Bf8 Ne6 Kd7 Nf4 Ne7 g4 a5 Ke2 Qb7 h4 Ra6 a3 Kc8 Be3 Kb8 Kf3 Rb6 Bd2 Qc8 Kg3 c5 Be3 c4 Nxe7 Bxe7 Bf5 Qd8 h5 Qg8 Kh3 Bg5 Rf3 Ra6 Raf1 b4 Nxd5 Qxd5 Bxg5 bxc3 bxc3 Rb6 Be3 Rb3

Blacks 14...Kf8 is suboptimal and leads to a quick loss.

41/68	06:31	 3269727k	8350k	+9,28	Bh6 Kg8 Rxd1 Bf8 N3h5 Bxg7 Nxg7 Qf8 Nf5 Ne7 Bxf8 Nxf5 Bxf5 Rxf8 Be6+ Kg7 Rd3 Rf4 Bxd5 c6 Rg3+ Kf8 Rf3 Rxf3 Bxf3 Kg7 Rf1 Re8 Be4 Re6 Ke2 a5 Ke3 Rh6 h3 a4 Kf4 Re6 h4 Re8 Ke3 h6 h5 Rf8 Rxf8 Kxf8

== Problem 4 ==
FEN: r1b1kb1r/1p1n1ppp/p2ppn2/6BB/2qNP3/2N5/PPP2PPP/R2Q1RK1 w kq - 0 1

Problem 4
Keres–Kotov, candidates,
Budapest 1950

Position: a8 black rook, c8 black bishop, e8 black king, f8 black bishop, h8 black rook, b7 black pawn, d7 black knight, f7 black pawn, g7 black pawn, h7 black pawn, a6 black pawn, d6 black pawn, e6 black pawn, f6 black knight, g5 white bishop, h5 white bishop, c4 black queen, d4 white knight, e4 white pawn, c3 white knight, a2 white pawn, b2 white pawn, c2 white pawn, f2 white pawn, g2 white pawn, h2 white pawn, a1 white rook, d1 white queen, f1 white rook, g1 white king

White to play: 10.Nxe6!!

10.Nxe6!! Qxe6 11.Nd5 Kd8 12.Bg4 Qe5 13.f4 Qxe4 (13...Qxb2 stronger but not sufficient: 14.Bxd7 Bxd7 15.Rb1 Qa3 16.Nxf6 Bb5 17.Qd4 Qc5 18.Rfd1 ±) 14.Bxd7 Bxd7 15.Nxf6 gxf6 16.Bxf6+ Kc7 17.Bxh8 and Black resigned on move 27.

Stockfish 14dev 64bit 4CPU running on 2020 hardware recognises the significance of 10.Nxe6 in 1 second. Stockfish_21092606_x64_avx2: NNUE evaluation using nn-13406b1dcbe0.nnue enabled.

22/37	00:01	     6955k	5367k	+4,00	Nxe6 Qxe6 Nd5 Kd8 Bg4 Qe5 f4 Qxb2 Rb1 Qa3 Bxd7 Bxd7 Nxf6 Bb5 Rf3 Qxa2 c4 Bxc4 Rf2 Qa5 Nd5+ f6 Nxf6 Kc7 Rc1 b5 Qd5 gxf6 Bxf6 Kb8 Rxc4 Qe1+ Rf1
51/70	47:10	 14538911k	5137k	+5,76	Nxe6 Qxe6 Nd5 Kd8 Bg4 Qe5 f4 Qxe4 Bxd7 Bxd7 Nxf6 Qf5 Qd4 Kc8 Nd5 Bc6 c4 f6 Nb6+ Kb8 Bh4 Be7 Rae1 Bd8 Nxa8 Kxa8 Bf2 Kb8 Qxd6+ Bc7 Ba7+ Kc8 Qe6+ Qxe6 Rxe6 h5 h4 Rd8 Re7 g6 Be3 Ba5 Kf2 Rd6 Rc1 Bd8 Rg7 Be4 Rg8 Kd7 c5 Rd3 Rc4 Bd5 Rg7+ Ke6 Rd4 Rxd4 Bxd4 Kf5 Rd7 Bc6 Rxd8 Kxf4 Bxf6

== Problem 5 ==
FEN: r2qrb1k/1p1b2p1/p2ppn1p/8/3NP3/1BN5/PPP3QP/1K3RR1 w - - 0 1

Problem 5
Spassky–Petrosian, w ch (19),
Moscow 1969

Position: a8 black rook, d8 black queen, e8 black rook, f8 black bishop, h8 black king, b7 black pawn, d7 black bishop, g7 black pawn, a6 black pawn, d6 black pawn, e6 black pawn, f6 black knight, h6 black pawn, d4 white knight, e4 white pawn, b3 white bishop, c3 white knight, a2 white pawn, b2 white pawn, c2 white pawn, g2 white queen, h2 white pawn, b1 white king, f1 white rook, g1 white rook

White to play: 21.e5!!

21.e5!! dxe5 22.Ne4! Nh5 23.Qg6!? (stronger is 23.Qg4!! Nf4 24.Nf3 Qc7 25.Nh4 ± ) 23...exd4? (23...Nf4 24.Rxf4! exf4 25.Nf3! Qb6 26.Rg5!! covering b5 and threatening Nf6 or Ne5-f7+) 24.Ng5 1−0

Stockfish 8 64bit 3CPU running on 2016 hardware recognises the significance of 21.e5 in 5 seconds. Stockfish 12 dev (Stockfish_20062212_x64_modern) 64bit 1CPU running on 2016 hardware recognizes the significance of 21.e5 in 11 seconds.

25/42 00:06 7 963k 1309k +6,93 e5 Nh5 Ne4 dxe5 Nf3 Nf4 Qg4 Qc7 Nh4 Bc6 Nf6 g5 Rxf4 exf4 Qh5 Qe7 Ng6+ Kg7 Nxe7 Rxe7 Ng4

37/62 03:12 298 083k 1545k +10,70 e5 Ng4 Qxg4 Qg5 Qh3 Qxe5 Nde2 g5 Rxf8+ Kg7 Rff1 Rf8 Re1 Qf5 Qg3 Rad8 Nd4 Qf4 Nxe6+ Bxe6 Rxe6 Qxg3

== Problem 6 ==
FEN: rnbqk2r/1p3ppp/p7/1NpPp3/QPP1P1n1/P4N2/4KbPP/R1B2B1R b kq - 0 1

Problem 6
Malaniuk–Ivanchuk, Moscow 1988

Position: a8 black rook, b8 black knight, c8 black bishop, d8 black queen, e8 black king, h8 black rook, b7 black pawn, f7 black pawn, g7 black pawn, h7 black pawn, a6 black pawn, b5 white knight, c5 black pawn, d5 white pawn, e5 black pawn, a4 white queen, b4 white pawn, c4 white pawn, e4 white pawn, g4 black knight, a3 white pawn, f3 white knight, e2 white king, f2 black bishop, g2 white pawn, h2 white pawn, a1 white rook, c1 white bishop, f1 white bishop, h1 white rook

Black to play: 13...axb5!!

13... axb5!! offers an exchange to keep the white queen out of play. 14.Qxa8 Bd4 15.Nxd4 cxd4 16.Qxb8 0-0! 17.Ke1 Qh4 18.g3 Qf6 19.Bf4 g5? (Ivanchuk found 19...d3! during post-game analysis.) 20.Rc1 exf4 21.Qxf4 Qd4 22.Rd1 bxc4 23.e5 Qc3+ 24.Rd2 Re8 25.Bxd3 cxd3 −+

Tasc R30 finds 19... d3! in 2 1/2 hours. 19... Bf5!! is even stronger than 19... d3.

Position is already lost at 19... d3 +8.00 for black, ... Bf5 not much better

Stockfish 14dev 64bit 4CPU running on 2020 hardware recognises the significance of axb5!! in 1 second. Stockfish_21092606_x64_avx2: NNUE evaluation using nn-13406b1dcbe0.nnue enabled.

21/28	  00:01	     9264k	4714k	-1,22	axb5 Qxa8 Bd4 Nxd4 cxd4 h3 Nf6 Bg5 0-0 cxb5 h6 Bxf6 Qxf6 Re1 Nd7 Kd1 Qg6 Qa4 Qg3 Qc2 Qxa3 Bd3 Qxb4 Qb1
46/67	1:05:00	 18113493k	4644k	-2,40	axb5 Qxa8 Bd4 h3 Nf6 Nxd4 exd4 Kf2 Nxe4+ Kg1 Nd7 Bg5 Qxg5 Qxc8+ Ke7 Qc7 Qe5 d6+ Qxd6 Qxd6+ Kxd6 bxc5+ Ndxc5 cxb5 d3 h4 d2 Rh3 Ke5 Be2 f5 Ra2 Rd8 Bd1 Rd4 Re3 f4 Re2 b6 a4 Kd6 Rc2 Kd5 Ra2 h6 Rb2 Nxa4 Bxa4 Rxa4 Rexd2+ Nxd2 Rxd2+ Kc4 Rd7 g6

== Problem 7 ==
FEN 1r1bk2r/2R2ppp/p3p3/1b2P2q/4QP2/4N3/1B4PP/3R2K1 w k - 0 1

Problem 7
Todorovic–Tosic, Arandjelovac, 1993

Position: b8 black rook, d8 black bishop, e8 black king, h8 black rook, c7 white rook, f7 black pawn, g7 black pawn, h7 black pawn, a6 black pawn, e6 black pawn, b5 black bishop, e5 white pawn, h5 black queen, e4 white queen, f4 white pawn, e3 white knight, b2 white bishop, g2 white pawn, h2 white pawn, d1 white rook, g1 white king

White to play: Rxd8+!!

1.Rxd8+!! Rxd8 (1...Kxd8 2.Ra7! Qe2 3.Qd4+ Ke8 4.h3 Qe1+ 5.Kh2 Rd8 6.Qc5 Qh4 7.Ba3 Rd7 8.Ra8+ Rd8 9.g3 1−0) 2.Ba3 Qe2 3.h3! Bd7 (better but still losing was 3...Qe1+ 4.Kh2 Qa5 5.Re7+ Kf8 6.Rd7+ Kg8 7.Bb4 Rxd7 8.Bxa5 ±) 4.Nf5! Qd1+ 5.Kh2 f6 6.exf6 1−0

The exchange sacrifice keeps control of the 7th rank. Genius 2 does better than the R30 on this one, but needs more than a month to find 1.Rxd8!!, even on a 90 MHz Pentium.

Fritz 9 plays 1.Rxd8!! in 2 seconds.

Stockfish 8 64bit 3CPU running on 2016 hardware recognises the significance of Rxd8!! in 8 seconds.

== Problem 8 ==
FEN r3rbk1/ppq2ppp/2b1pB2/8/6Q1/1P1B3P/P1P2PP1/R2R2K1 w - - 0 24

Problem 8
Gufeld–Osnos, Koutaissi 1978

Position: a8 black rook, e8 black rook, f8 black bishop, g8 black king, a7 black pawn, b7 black pawn, c7 black queen, f7 black pawn, g7 black pawn, h7 black pawn, c6 black bishop, e6 black pawn, f6 white bishop, g4 white queen, b3 white pawn, d3 white bishop, h3 white pawn, a2 white pawn, c2 white pawn, f2 white pawn, g2 white pawn, a1 white rook, d1 white rook, g1 white king

White to play: 24.Bxh7+!!

24.Bxh7+!! is natural, but Black has some defensive resources. 24...Kxh7 25.Qh5+ Kg8 26.Rd4! gxf6 27.Rg4+ Bg7 28.Qh6 Kf8 29.Rxg7! Rac8 (computers prefer 29...Be4 which also loses after 30.Rg4+ Ke7 31.Rxe4 Rad8 32.c4 Qa5 33.Rae1 ±) 30.Qh7 b5 31.Rd1 Bd5 32.c4 bxc4 33.bxc4 1−0

Stockfish 15dev 64bit 4CPU running on 2020 hardware recognises the significance of Bxh7+!! under 1 second (Stockfish_23010111_x64_avx2).

25/38	00:01	   5557k   5380k	+0,83	Bxh7+ Kxh7 Qh5+ Kg8 Rd4 Bf3 gxf3 Qxc2 Rd7 Qg6+ Qxg6 fxg6 Be5 Re7 Rad1 Kf7 R7d4 Rc8 h4 Ke8 Kg2 b6 Rg4 Rc2 Rxg6 Rxa2 h5 Ra5 f4 Rd5 Rxd5

The position is probably drawn with perfect play

50/70	06:21   1850368k   4851k	+0,49	Bxh7+ Kxh7 Qh5+ Kg8 Rd4 Bf3 gxf3 Qc5 Qxc5 Bxc5 Rg4 Bf8 c4 a6 Rd1 Rac8 a4 Rc6 Bd8 e5 h4 Ree6 f4 Red6 Rxd6 Rxd6 Bc7 Rd1+ Kg2 exf4 Rxf4

The suggested move 26...gxf6 is blunder which loses

42/76	03:59   1404483k   5862k	+4,56	Rg4+ Bg7 Qh6 Kf8 Rxg7 Qf4 Rxf7+ Kxf7 Qxf4 Rad8 Re1 Rh8 Qc4 Rd6 f3 Rh5 a4 a6 Re2 Rhd5 c3 Rh5 Kf2 Rdd5 h4 Rh8 Qg4 e5 h5 Rg8 Qc4 Kg7 Qh4

== Problem 9 ==
FEN r4r1k/4bppb/2n1p2p/p1n1P3/1p1p1BNP/3P1NP1/qP2QPB1/2RR2K1 w - - 0 1

Problem 9
Weinstein–Elyoseph, Israel 1992

Position: a8 black rook, f8 black rook, h8 black king, e7 black bishop, f7 black pawn, g7 black pawn, h7 black bishop, c6 black knight, e6 black pawn, h6 black pawn, a5 black pawn, c5 black knight, e5 white pawn, b4 black pawn, d4 black pawn, f4 white bishop, g4 white knight, h4 white pawn, d3 white pawn, f3 white knight, g3 white pawn, a2 black queen, b2 white pawn, e2 white queen, f2 white pawn, g2 white bishop, c1 white rook, d1 white rook, g1 white king

White to play: Ng5!!

1.Ng5 hxg5 2.hxg5 (with the idea of 3. Nf6) and now:

A. 2...Rac8 3.Nf6!!

A1. 3...gxf6 which loses if white plays precisely: 4.gxf6 and now:

A1a. 4...Nxd3? 5.Rxd3 Bxd3? 6.Qh5+ is mate in 4.

A1b. 4...Re8 5.Rxc5! (5.Qh5!? Kg8 6.Rxc5! Bg6! 7.Qh4 Bxc5 8.Be4 Ne7 9.Kg2! is winning as well.) 5...Bxc5 6.Qh5 with the idea 7.Be4 and White is winning.

A1c. 4...Bg6 5.Bxc6 Bxf6 (6...Rxc6 6.fxe7 Re8 7.Bg5 f5 8.Bf6+ Kg8 9.Qd2 is winning) 7.Rxc5 Be7 8.Rcc1 and White is better.

A2. 3...Nb8 4.Bd5!! (to block d5 so White can play Kg2 without having to deal with ...Qd5+; 4.Qh5!? Bxf6 5.gxf6 Nbd7 (5...gxf6 6.Rxc5! Rxc5 7.Be4 f5 8.Kg2! Rg8 9.Rh1 Rg7 10.Bh6 Nd7 11.Bxg7+ Kxg7 12.Qxh7+ Kf8 13.Qh6+ Ke8 14.Qg5 is winning.) 6.Bb7 Nxb7 7.Rxc8 Rxc8 8.Qxf7 Rg8 9.Qxd7 with advantage for White.) 4...exd5 (4...Qxd5 5.Nxd5 exd5 6.Kg2! should win as well.) 5.Kg2! Bxf6 6.Rh1! Bg5 7.Qh5 Bh6 8.Bxh6 with mate to follow.

B. 2...Rfc8 3.Nf6!!

B1. 3...gxf6 4.exf6! (4.gxf6 Nxd3 (4...Bf8 5.Rxc5! Bxc5 6.Qh5 Kg8 7.Be4 Bxe4 8.dxe4 wins for White.) 5.Rxd3 Bxd3 6.Qxd3 Nxe5! 7.Rxc8+ Rxc8 8.Bxe5 Qa1+ is unclear, probably a draw.) and now:

B1a. 4...Bf8? 5.Rxc5! Bxc5 6.Qh5 Kg8 7.Be4 Bxe4 8.dxe4 is winning for White, e.g. 8...Qa4 9.Rc1 Ne7 10.fxe7 Qe8 11.Kg2! f6 12.Qh6.

B1b. 4...Nxd3 5. Rxd3 Bf8! (6...Bxd3 6. Qxd3 wins for White.) 6.Rxc6 (6.Bxc6!? Rxc6 7.Rxc6 Qd5 8.Rc7 is better for White.) 6...Rxc6 7.Bxc6 Rd8 8.Rd1 is also favorable for White.

B2. 3...Bg6 is probably Black's best try:

B2a. 4.Bxc6 gxf6 5.exf6 Bf8! 6.Bxa8 Rxa8 7.Rc4 and Black seems to hold.

B2b. 4.Qg4 gxf6 5.gxf6 Nxd3 (5...Bf8? 6.Qh3+ Kg8 7.Bh6! is winning) 6.Rxd3 Bf8 7.Rdd1 is unclear.

Pierre Nolot seems to have repudiated this problem.

1.Nxh6 is much better than 1.Ng5 Stockfish_20042208_x64_modern:

65/114	49:42:09  568217595k  3176k	+6,06	Nxh6 gxh6 Bxh6 Qd5 Bg5 Ra7 Bxe7 Rxe7 Ng5 Qxe5 Qh5 f5 Bxc6 Qd6 Qh6 Kg8 Bb5 Rb8 Be8 Nd7 Bf7+ Rxf7 Nxf7 Qf8 Qxf8+ Nxf8 Ne5 Bg6 Nxg6 Nxg6 Rc6 Kf7 Re1 Nf8 Ra6 Rb7 Rxa5 Kf6 f4 Nd7 Rc1 Kf7 Rc4 Nf6 Kf2 Rb6 Rxd4 Kg7 Ra8 Kg6 Kf3 Nd5 Ke2 

although according to SF15 dev (Stockfish_23010111_x64_avx2) after forcing moves suggested by Pierre Nolot

1.Ng5!! hxg5 the position is still winning

62/77	1:32:35	   28015307k  5043k +2,15	hxg5 Rfc8 Nf6 gxf6 exf6 Nxd3 Rxd3 Bf8 Rxc6 Rxc6 Bxc6 Rd8 Rd1 Qb3 Rd2 Kg8 Qe5 Qc4 Qc7 e5 Bxe5 Qc1+ Kg2 Qxd2 Qxd8 Qe2 Qxd4 a4 Bf3 Qc2 Bd6 Qd3 Bc5 Qxd4 Bxd4 b3 Bd5 Bc2 Kf3 a3 bxa3 Bxa3 g6 Bxg6 Bxb3 Kf8 Ke2 Bf5 f3 Bd7 Bc4 Bc1 Kf2 Ba4

== Problem 10 ==
FEN r1b2rk1/1p1nbppp/pq1p4/3B4/P2NP3/2N1p3/1PP3PP/R2Q1R1K w - - 0 15

Problem 10
Van der Wiel–Ribli,
Amsterdam 1980

Position: a8 black rook, c8 black bishop, f8 black rook, g8 black king, b7 black pawn, d7 black knight, e7 black bishop, f7 black pawn, g7 black pawn, h7 black pawn, a6 black pawn, b6 black queen, d6 black pawn, d5 white bishop, a4 white pawn, d4 white knight, e4 white pawn, c3 white knight, e3 black pawn, b2 white pawn, c2 white pawn, g2 white pawn, h2 white pawn, a1 white rook, d1 white queen, f1 white rook, h1 white king

White to play: 15.Rxf7!!

15.Rxf7!! Rxf7 16.Bxf7 Kxf7 17.Qh5+ Kg8 16.Qe8+ Bf8 19.Nd5 Qxd4 20.Ne7+ Kh8 21.Rf1 Qf6 22.Rxf6 and white won on move 29.

Stockfish 8 64bit 3CPU running on 2016 hardware recognises the significance of Rxf7!! in 9 seconds.

Stockfish 15dev 64bit 4CPU running on 2020 hardware recognises the significance of Rxf7!! under 1 second (Stockfish_23010111_x64_avx2).

25/32	00:00	   5895k	6115k	+2,47	Rxf7 Rxf7 Bxf7+ Kh8 Nd5 Qxb2 Nxe7 Nc5 Nf3 Bd7 Nf5 Rf8 Nxd6 Bxa4 Qd4 Qxd4 Nxd4 Nxe4 Nxe4 Rxf7 Ng3 Bd7 h3 g6 Ra3 Re7 Nge2 Be8 Kg1 Bf7 Rc3 Kg7
49/74	05:02	1671688k	5520k	+3,94	Rxf7 Rxf7 Bxf7+ Kh8 Nd5 Qxb2 Nxe7 Nf6 Rb1 Bg4 Rxb2 Bxd1 Bc4 b5 Bd3 bxa4 Kg1 Rf8 Rb1 e2 Nxe2 Bxe2 Bxe2 Nxe4 Nd5 g5 Ra1 Rb8 Bxa6 Rb2 Ne3 Rb4 

== Problem 11 ==
FEN r1b3k1/p2p1nP1/2pqr1Rp/1p2p2P/2B1PnQ1/1P6/P1PP4/1K4R1 w - - 0 1

Problem 11
Teichmann–NN, Zurich 1920

Position: a8 black rook, c8 black bishop, g8 black king, a7 black pawn, d7 black pawn, f7 black knight, g7 white pawn, c6 black pawn, d6 black queen, e6 black rook, g6 white rook, h6 black pawn, b5 black pawn, e5 black pawn, h5 white pawn, c4 white bishop, e4 white pawn, f4 black knight, g4 white queen, b3 white pawn, a2 white pawn, c2 white pawn, d2 white pawn, b1 white king, g1 white rook

White to play: Rxh6!!

Neishtadt's "Leçons de tactique" gives: "1.Rxh6!! the g pawn will be helped by the h pawn 1...Nxh6 (1...Rxh6 2.Bxf7+ Kxf7 3.g8Q+) 2.Qg5 Nf7 3.Qd8+!! Nxd8 4.h6 and there is nothing to prevent h6-h7+ 1−0"

But 4...Qd4!! 5.h7+ Kf7 6.g8Q+ Ke7 7.h8Q Kd6 8.Rg7 Qxd2!! 9.Qxd8 Qd1+! (if 9...Kc5? 10.Rxd7 Bxd7 11.Qxa8 Kb4 12.Qh1! and White wins. Not 12.Qxa7? Qe1+ 13.Kb2 Qc3+ with perpetual check.) 10.Kb2 Qd4+ 11.Ka3 Qc5+ 12.b4 Qe3+ 13.Bd3 Qc1+ 14.Kb3 Qb1+ 15.Kc3 Qe1+ 1/2 as White cannot escape the black checks.

Stockfish 8 64bit 3CPU running on 2016 hardware recognises the drawing significance of Rxh6!! in 7 seconds.

== See also ==
- Europe Échecs
