= Wii Chess =

2008 video game

- European box art
- Developers: Nintendo SPD; Lancarse
- Publisher: Nintendo
- Directors: Makoto Yoshida; Azusa Tajima; Kazuki Yoshihara
- Producer: Hitoshi Yamagami
- Composer: Kenichiro Iwasaki
- Series: Wii
- Platform: Wii
- Release: Wii: EU: January 18, 2008; WiiWare: JP: September 30, 2008
- Genre: Computer chess
- Modes: Single-player, multiplayer

Wii Chess is a 2008 computer chess game developed by Nintendo and Lancarse and published by Nintendo for the Wii. It was released on January 18, 2008 in Europe and September 30, 2008 in Japan as a "budget-oriented" retail title.

Wii Chess was announced in December 2007 to a mixed reception; it was criticized for its lack of Mii characters, lack of customizability, price, and its "bland visuals", but was praised for its AI difficulty, and its online multiplayer capability. It originally sold in 2008 for €30 / £21, and was labeled "overpriced" by critics. Wii Chess was never released in North America or Australasia, making it the only game in the Wii series that was never released in those continents. In September 2008, Wii Chess was re-released as a downloadable WiiWare title in Japan as Tsūshin Taikyoku: World Chess. (Note: Japanese: 通信対局 ワールドチェス, Hepburn: Tsūshin Taikyoku: Wārudochesu; transl. [Tele]communication Game: World Chess)

== Gameplay ==
Players of Wii Chess are able to play against AI and set its difficulty.

Unlike other games in the Wii series, Wii Chess is the only game in the Wii series that can be played using the Wii Classic Controller, and the only game to not use the Wii Remote's pointer function; instead, chess pieces are moved across the board using the D-pad on the controller.

Wii Chess features an option that gives players new to chess instructions on how each piece should move across the board. Players are also able to record and replay their games at a later time. Players could also play online against other players courtesy of the Nintendo Wi-Fi Connection, with Wii Chess players being able to compete against players who own the Japanese WiiWare exclusive Tsūshin Taikyoku: World Chess and vice versa.

The engine used in Wii Chess is based on Loop Express by Fritz Reul. Wii Chess features nine differencing themes, with each having their own custom boards, chess pieces. Players are able to customize their themes and their own custom name. When selecting a chess piece, Wii Chess will show where the piece could move. Wii Chess also features hints, which helps beginners to learn how to play chess, as well as a replay feature, allowing any player to analyze any chess game they've played before.

== Reception ==
Reception

Review scores
| Publication | Score |
|---|---|
| Eurogamer | 7/10 |
| GamesRadar+ | 2.5/5 |
| Official Nintendo Magazine | 78% |
| VideoGamer.com | 7/10 |

Wii Chess received mixed reviews from critics. Chris Greenhough from Engadget criticized Wii Chess, labeling it as a "missed opportunity". Its default background music was criticized, labeling it as "elevator music" and the lack of custom Nintendo-related chess pieces from other Nintendo franchises like Mario.

Alex Dale from GamesRadar+ also criticized Wii Chess for being "ugly" and its "awful elevator music" and poor controls, while also praising Wii Chess for its ability to save games and being able to replay them, and the AI difficulty has a "good curve". Dale would go on and state that "despite [Wii Chess] being fundamentally solid, there aren't enough features here to make Wii Chess a viable buy."

Official Nintendo Magazine UK gave the game 78%. They praised the great online multiplayer and how the game plays a "perfect game", while also criticizing that the fact many other websites do the exact same thing for free. Their main criticisms were the bland visuals and the fact it will not capture the imaginations of people who do not like chess. Eurogamer gave the game a rating of 7/10, citing that it features a number of "sensible options", but notes that it misses features that would more than justify the price of the game.

Wesley Yin-Poole from VideoGamer.com praised Wii Chess stating that "[Wii Chess] is everything a chess fan could want" while also criticizing the lack of Wii Remote functionality; calling it a "real shame", noting that since Wii Chess is navigated using the Wii Remote's D-pad instead of the IR sensor, calling it "slow and clunky, and a bit weird". Yin-Poole also praised the replay feature, and its scale of difficulty for AI; allowing the player to choose from a scale to 1 to 10 for difficulty.
