= Play Magnus (mobile app) =

Mobile chess game

- Original author: Tord Romstad et al.
- Developer: Play Magnus AS
- Release: 1 January 2014; 12 years ago
- Operating system: iOS, Android
- Type: Computer chess
- License: Commercial software
- Website: playmagnus.com

Play Magnus is a commercial computer chess mobile app available for the iOS and Android mobile operating systems. The software is named after former World Chess Champion Magnus Carlsen and features adjustable difficulty levels for chess players of various skills. It has been available since 2014 and is developed by the Norwegian company Play Magnus AS, which was co-founded by Carlsen.

== Description ==
The program is a chess engine tuned to play at 30 different skill levels based on Magnus Carlsen's ability at given ages.

Users earn points by playing chess, or can purchase points for money. Points can be spent on querying the engine for move suggestions, and on the undo function (the cost of this is higher at the higher levels). With a large points balance, it used to be possible to win a chance of playing Magnus in person but this is no longer mentioned by the app.

After each game, the app gives the user a chance to "share" their result on Facebook or Twitter, or to save the game as PGN. It also includes various quotes from Magnus that are presented between games.

The first skill level ("age 5") plays moves predominantly at random.

== History ==
The development of Play Magnus began after Carlsen founded Play Magnus AS and invested his own money and funds from investors into the company. It was developed by a team including Tord Romstad, one of the creators of Stockfish, who said he based the engine on his Stockfish predecessor "Glaurung" to avoid copyright issues with Stockfish itself. Romstad also said they "intentionally made the progression up to about age 14 a bit more linear than it was in reality (in an attempt to make the progression not be too steep, but user feedback indicates that it might be too steep nevertheless)".

Play Magnus was released in January 2014 for iOS and late 2014 for Android. It received close to one million downloads by November 2016. It had risen to 2.8 million downloads as of December 2017.

In August 2022, the Play Magnus Group accepted an offer of acquisition from Chess.com, for nearly $83 million.
