= 1K ZX Chess =

1982 video game

- Box cover
- Designer: David Horne
- Platform: Sinclair ZX81
- Release: 1982
- Genre: Abstract strategy
- Mode: Single-player

1K ZX Chess is a 1982 chess program for the unexpanded Sinclair ZX81.

== Description ==
1K ZX Chess's code takes up only 672 bytes in memory, but implements chess rules except for castling, promotion, and en passant, including a computer opponent. It was the smallest implementation of chess on any computer at the time. Developer David Horne discussed 1K ZX Chess and published the full source code as a type-in program in a series of articles in Your Computer in 1982 and 1983.

== Reception ==
Popular Computing Weekly in 1982 called 1K ZX Chess "one of the most interesting ZX tapes to pass through our office in recent weeks". It approved of the computer displaying moves while considering them and noted "the skills which went into writing a chess program in 1K of machine code. Is there anyone reading this who could even contemplate doing the same?" The magazine concluded, "Despite the limitations this is one cassette, at £3, which I would recommend." Sinclair User in 1983 stated that "it takes some technical wizardry to squeeze this kind of game into the unexpanded ZX81". The magazine praised the game's quick loading speed, and found that it "makes its moves very fast for the amount of memory available for it". Home Computing Weekly gave the game three out of five stars, criticizing the confusing user interface but stating that "it still produces play which needs some thought to beat". Tim Harding wrote in a 1985 book on computer chess that "the man who did it must be some sort of genius". While describing 1K ZX Chess' quality of play as "so appalling that it would be hard to make it beat you" and criticizing the backward algebraic notation, he concluded that "the program is nevertheless a fantastic technical achievement". A breakdown of all the optimizations was provided in a rebuild of the original source.

1K ZX Chess came in second place for best software in a poll of ZX81 users. Retrogaming Times Monthly described it as "history's greatest game programming feat"; Kuro5hin agreed, calling 1K ZX Chess "the greatest program ever written". BootChess author Olivier Poudade praised 1K ZX Chess's code, stating that at first writing a smaller chess program "seemed impossible ... Horne had nailed it so much already". Poudade acknowledged replicating some of Horne's methods as he could not improve them.

== See also ==
- Microchess
