= Chessaria: The Tactical Adventure =

2018 video game

- Cover art showing the High Elves surrounded by the Dark Elves and the Orcs.
- Developer: Pixel Wizards
- Designer: Matthieu Baldy
- Composer: Ben Rawles
- Platforms: Windows, Mac
- Release: March 8, 2018
- Genres: Chess, Turn-based strategy
- Modes: Single-player, multiplayer

Chessaria: The Tactical Adventure is a 3D chess game developed by Pixel Wizards and released on Steam (Windows/Mac) in March 2018.

== Gameplay ==
Chessaria is a video game in which the chess pieces come to life as animated fantasy characters. The game follows the rules of traditional chess and the battles always play out so that the capturing piece defeats its target. The game contains three playable armies (High Elves, Dark Elves, Orcs), each composed of six heroes based on the moves and attacks of chess pieces.

The goal of the game is level-based and includes rescue operations, zone domination, assassination missions and Boss battles. The game takes place on grids of different size set in scenery that impacts the tiles' accessibility. The game is played from an overhead perspective and offers a tactical view were the 3D pieces appear as chess icons.

Chessaria can be played in three game modes: Adventure, Quick Game and Online Multiplayer. The Adventure is a solo campaign composed of a hundred chess puzzles and chess battles. The Quick Game is a PVP/PVE mode that allows playing customizable games of classic chess and chess variants such as Horde Chess and Barricade Chess. The Online Multiplayer is a PVP game mode that enables Steam friends to play the Quick Game variants in Online Multiplayer battles.

== Plot ==
The story of Chessaria begins after a thousand years of peace and prosperity, the elven city of Silveran is attacked by a fire dragon coming from the north. The High Elves decide to embark on a journey to seek justice and unveil the truth behind the attack.

== Chess Engine ==
The game's Artificial Intelligence called Chessaria AICE was developed by Enrique Sánchez Acosta, a Ph.D. computer scientist, research and development software engineer, and computer chess programmer. The A.I. is an enhanced chess engine based on the research made for the Alfil chess engine, created by Acosta. and rated over 2800 Elo Chessaria AICE supports MultiThread computing, new missions outside of checkmate, asymmetrical objectives, new pieces and different kind of obstacles.

== Soundtrack ==
The thirteen orchestral tracks of the game were created by British composer Ben Rawles.
