= War Chess =

2003 video game

- Developer: SuperEmpire Interactive Inc.
- Publishers: XS Games, Big Fish Games, Piko Interactive
- Designer: Ilia Stepanov
- Programmers: Ilia Stepanov; Anton Krasnogor
- Artists: Igor Kolomeytsev; Michael Saburov
- Composer: Denis Borzenkov
- Platforms: Windows; PlayStation 2
- Release: Windows: 2003; PlayStation 2: 2004
- Genres: Strategy, Tactics, Fantasy Chess
- Modes: Single-player, multiplayer

War Chess (also known as Магические шахматы in Russian and Wizard Chess in English) is a fantasy-themed, chess-based strategy and tactics video game developed by SuperEmpire Interactive Inc. in 2003 and published by XS Games, Big Fish Games and Piko Interactive.

== Gameplay ==
War Chess combines traditional chess rules with fantasy elements. Instead of the classic black and white pieces, two fantasy armies face each other, such as humans and elves against undead creatures.

The game features include:

- A total of 11 different arenas to play on, such as forest, desert, ice, lava, Treasure Cave.
- Full 3D graphics with rotatable camera perspectives.
- A difficulty slider allowing the single-player mode to adapt to the player's skill level.
- Multiplayer options: hot-seat on the same computer, LAN play, and online matches.

== Development and release ==
The game was developed by Moscow, Russia-based studio SuperEmpire Interactive Inc. War Chess was first released for Windows in 2003, followed by a PlayStation 2 version in 2004. Over time, it was distributed through multiple publishers, including Big Fish Games for the PC platform.

== Legacy ==
The fantasy chess concept of the game is often compared to classics like Battle Chess, though War Chess distinguishes itself with its variety of arenas and visual diversity. Its continued availability on platforms such as GOG.com and Big Fish Games has preserved its appeal for nostalgic players.
