= Battle vs. Chess =

2011 video game

- Developer: Targem Games
- Publishers: TopWare Interactive; SouthPeak Games^{(US)}
- Engine: Dagor Engine 3.0
- Platforms: Linux, Microsoft Windows, Mac OS X, PlayStation 3, Xbox 360, Wii
- Release: EU: May 17, 2011; NA: August 16, 2012 (computers)
- Genre: Board game
- Modes: Single-player, multiplayer

Battle vs. Chess (Russian: Battle vs Chess: Королевские битвы), also known as Check vs. Mate in North America, is a computer simulation game of chess developed by Targem Games and published by TopWare Interactive. It is intended to target all major seventh-generation platforms as well as Microsoft Windows, Mac OS X and Linux, the console and computer versions were released in Europe on May 17, 2011, while the handheld versions were cancelled.

== Gameplay ==
Players move with the animated fantasy figurines in one of the six available environments. The white pieces are from heaven and the black pieces are from hell. The game has tutorial, multiplayer (on one device, over LAN or Internet), two campaign modes with 30 missions, the Battleground mode and various mini-games. Battle vs. Chess uses chess engine Fritz 10 to make its moves. There is no setting for a time limit, so at a higher level than 6 the computer tends to take a long time to think; at level 7 it can take about 15 minutes, while at level 9 (ELO 3750) it can take up to a few hours.

== Lawsuit with Interplay ==
The game was not initially released in the United States due to a lawsuit by Interplay Entertainment for trademark infringement due to its similarity to their title Battle Chess. The case went to trial by jury in the summer of 2012. That year, the United States District Court for the Central District of California granted a default judgment in Interplay's favor after TopWare fired its attorney and was unable to locate new counsel. On November 15, the parties settled with TopWare agreeing to pay Interplay approximately $200,000, plus interest. After the lawsuit, the game was released in North America as Check vs. Mate to avoid the Interplay trademark on planned remake of Battle Chess, through digital distribution networks including Steam.

== Reception ==
GamingBoulevard.com rated the game 80%, Eurogamer.de 90%, Gameover.gr 90%, and on Metacritic.com it has rating 69%.
