= Chess Assistant =

Commercial database program produced by Convekta Ltd

- Developers: Convekta, Ltd.
- Stable release: 25 / January 2025
- Operating system: Windows
- Type: Chess database
- License: Proprietary commercial software
- Website: chessok.com

Chess Assistant is a commercial database program produced by Convekta, Ltd. The company started in Russia, but also has offices in England and the United States. The software is a management tool for organizing chess information (databases of millions of games), opening training, game analysis, playing against the computer, and viewing electronic texts. It is the major commercial competitor to ChessBase. The first version of Chess Assistant was released in 1990. The current version 25, released in January 2025, includes a database of 9.38 million games and 40 million computer-generated evaluations of opening moves. The program uses Stockfish as an analysis tool.

== See also ==
- ChessBase
- Chess engines
- Chess Informant
- Shane's Chess Information Database
