= ChessBase =

Chess software website company

ChessBase is a German company that develops and sells chess software, maintains a chess news site, and operates an internet chess server for online chess. Founded in 1986, it maintains and sells large-scale databases containing the moves of recorded chess games. The databases contain data from prior games and provide engine analyses of games. Endgame tablebases are also provided by the company.

ChessBase India, ChessBase's Indian YouTube channel, has amassed more than 2.5 million YouTube subscribers and more than 2.5 billion total views as of December 2024.

== History ==
Starting in 1983, Frederic Friedel and his colleagues put out a magazine Computer-schach und Spiele covering the emerging hobby of computer chess. In 1985, Friedel invited then world chess champion Garry Kasparov to his house. Kasparov mused about how a chess database would make it easier for him to prepare for specific opponents. Friedel began working with Bonn physicist Matthias Wüllenweber who created the first such database, ChessBase 1.0, as software for the Atari ST. The February 1987 issue of Computer-schach und Spiele introduced the database program as well as the ChessBase magazine, a floppy disk containing chess games edited by chess grandmaster John Nunn.

The August 1991 issue of Computer-schach und Spiele announced that Dutch programmer Frans Morsch's Fritz program would soon be available for purchase as software for PCs. This method of software sale was unlike all the dedicated chess computers which at the time dominated the ratings lists. This program was marketed initially as Knightstalker in the U.S., while it was marketed as Fritz in the rest of the world. Mathias Feist joined ChessBase and ported Fritz to MS-DOS and then Windows.

In 1994, German chess grandmaster Rainer Knaak joined ChessBase as a full-time employee, annotating games for the ChessBase magazine, and soon authoring game database CD-ROMs on topics such as the Trompowsky Attack or Mating Attacks against 0-0. British grandmaster Daniel King was another early author of such CD-ROMs which eventually grew into the Fritztrainer series of multimedia DVDs.

In the mid-1990s, R&D Publishing in the U.S. released a series of print books in the ChessBase University Opening Series, including Karpov and Alexander Beliavsky's The Caro-Kann in Black and White.

In December 1996, ChessBase added Mark Uniacke's Hiarcs 6 chess engine to its product line up, selling it inside the existing Fritz graphical user interface (GUI). In March 1998, ChessBase added Junior 4.6 and Dr. Christian Donninger's Nimzo99. Also that year, ChessBase released Fritz 5 including a 'friend mode' which would automatically scale its strength of play down to the level that it assessed the player was playing. This remains a feature of all of ChessBase's graphical user interfaces.

In 1998, ChessBase took their database of chess games online. In November, ChessBase started offering trainer CD-ROMs by such grandmasters as Robert Hübner, Rainer Knaak and Daniel King.

In 1999, Stefan Meyer-Kahlen's Shredder had won the World Computer Chess Championship. In April, Meyer-Kahlen and Huber released the Universal Chess Interface (UCI) protocol for engines to communicate with GUIs, to compete with Winboard and ChessBase. Meyer-Kahlen's contract with Millennium 2000 expired in June, and ChessBase hired him shortly after, adding Shredder to their product line under a Fritz style GUI, and giving their new GUIs the ability to import UCI engines.

In April 2000, ChessBase released a Young Talents CD featuring the engines Anmon, Goliath Light, Gromit, Ikarus, Patzer, Phalanx and Rudolf Huber's SOS. Christophe Theron's engines Chess Tiger and Gambit Tiger were also released as ChessBase engines that month.

In the early 2000s matches were held pitting world champions Garry Kasparov and Vladimir Kramnik against versions of the Fritz or Junior engines.

In 2003, ChessBase introduced the Chess Media System, allowing players to produce videos with them playing out moves that can be seen on the user's chessboard within a ChessBase program. Eventually, ChessBase commissioned world champions Garry Kasparov, Viswanathan Anand, Vladimir Kramnik and Rustam Kasimdzhanov to produce DVDs using the new format. ChessBase also produced Fritztrainer Opening DVDs by the likes of grandmasters Alexei Shirov and Viktor Bologan and a Power Play series by British grandmaster Daniel King for lower level players.

In April 2006, following its victory at the World Computer Chess Championship, Anthony Cozzie's Zappa chess engine was published by ChessBase as Zap!Chess.

In 2008, Vasik Rajlich's Rybka engine was added to the ChessBase product line, followed by Robert Houdart's Houdini and Don Dailey and Larry Kaufman's Komodo engines.

Recent versions of ChessBase and the engine GUIs such as Fritz supports cloud engines. ChessBase/Playchess added a web interface by 2013. ChessBase added a tactics trainer web app in 2015. In 2015, ChessBase released a play Fritz web app, as well as My Games for storing one's games.

== The company ==
The company is located in Hamburg, Germany. ChessBaseUSA markets their products in the United States, and some of their most popular programs are sold by licensee Viva Media, a division of Encore, Inc. In 1998, the German company Data Becker released the program 3D Schach Genie, containing the Shredder engine and Fritz interface. ChessBase India markets their products in India and surrounding countries. ChessBase India is run by International Master(IM) Sagar Shah and his wife Amruta Mokal.

== The database ==
ChessBase was originally designed for the Atari ST by Matthias Wüllenweber, the physicist/co-founder of the company. Mathias Feist helped port the program to DOS. In more recent years, Lutz Nebe, Wolfgang Haar and Jeroen van den Belt have also been involved in program development.

Image of ChessBase 8.0 running under Windows XP (year 2008).

ChessBase uses a proprietary format for storing games (CBH), but can also handle games in portable game notation (PGN). The proprietary format uses less hard drive space and manages information that is not possible in PGN. The software converts files from PGN to ChessBase format, or from ChessBase to PGN.

The program permits searches for games, and positions in games, based on player names, openings, some tactical and strategic motifs, material imbalance, and features of the position. ChessBase can import engines either those such as Fritz or Shredder in native ChessBase format or Universal Chess Interface (UCI) engines such as Stockfish.

As of 19 November 2020, ChessBase's database contained over 8.4 million games. The online database can be accessed directly through their database programs.

== Playchess ==
Playchess.com
- Website type: Internet chess server, Social media website
- Website: playchess.com
- Registration: Yes
- Current status: Active

Playchess is an internet chess service managed by ChessBase where players can play and discuss chess and chess variants. As of February 2011, Playchess had more than 31,000 players online, including many internationally titled players who remain pseudo-anonymous and other masters whose identities are known, such as Hikaru Nakamura, Nigel Short and Michael Adams.

ChessBase provides the proprietary Playchess software, which is included with popular computer chess software like Fritz, Junior or Shredder. With the purchase of any of these playing programs, customers get one-year of access to the server. Alternately, users may download the client software, a pared down version of the Fritz GUI. New users may try the server for a short period of time before access requires a serial number. Guests may always log in for free, but have limited access.

The software has functions to try to detect players using the assistance of chess programs (mainly by task switching).

This is a competitor to other commercial servers, such as Internet Chess Club (ICC), World Chess Live (WCL) and the non-commercial Free Internet Chess Server (FICS).

Playchess uses an internal currency called Ducats which can be used to purchase services (chess courses, lectures and interviews). Ducats can be purchased online with a credit card and with PayPal. The current rate is 1 Ducat = €0.10 (excluding VAT)

== News site ==
ChessBase also maintains ChessBase News, a web site containing chess news, as well as information on their products. The site is available in English, German, Spanish and Hindi.

== Other publications ==
ChessBase produces CDs and DVDs, including monographs on famous players, tactical training exercises, and training for specific opening systems. They publish the ChessBase Magazine six times per year, which comes on DVD with video clip interviews, articles on opening novelties, database updates (including annotated games), and other articles. All these are designed for viewing within their database software or the free ChessBase Reader.

== Related computer programs ==
A database-only version of ChessBase for the BBC Micro, called "BBChessBase", was published by Peter Tate in 1991.

Gerritt Reubold's Der Bringer chess program is a rare example of a ChessBase format engine not released by ChessBase itself.

== Criticism and legal issues ==
ChessBase has faced criticism for allegedly using free software created by others without credit. The developers of Stockfish, an open-source chess engine, charged that Fat Fritz 2 is a modified copy of their software (that had originally been uncredited; since rectified) and that ChessBase claims "originality where there is none". Lichess described the same product as "a rip-off".

ChessBase responded to this criticism by adding references but claiming the new engine differs from Stockfish due to added input from the original Fat Fritz neural network—itself claimed by Lichess to be derived closely from Leela Chess Zero, another open-source initiative.

In July 2021, Stockfish sued ChessBase, alleging that ChessBase violated Stockfish's GNU General Public License. In November 2022, a settlement on that lawsuit was reached.

== See also ==
- Chess Assistant
- Chess engines
- Chess Informant
- Fritz (chess)
- Shane's Chess Information Database
- Internet Chess Servers
- Rules of chess
