= GNU Chess =

Free software chess engine

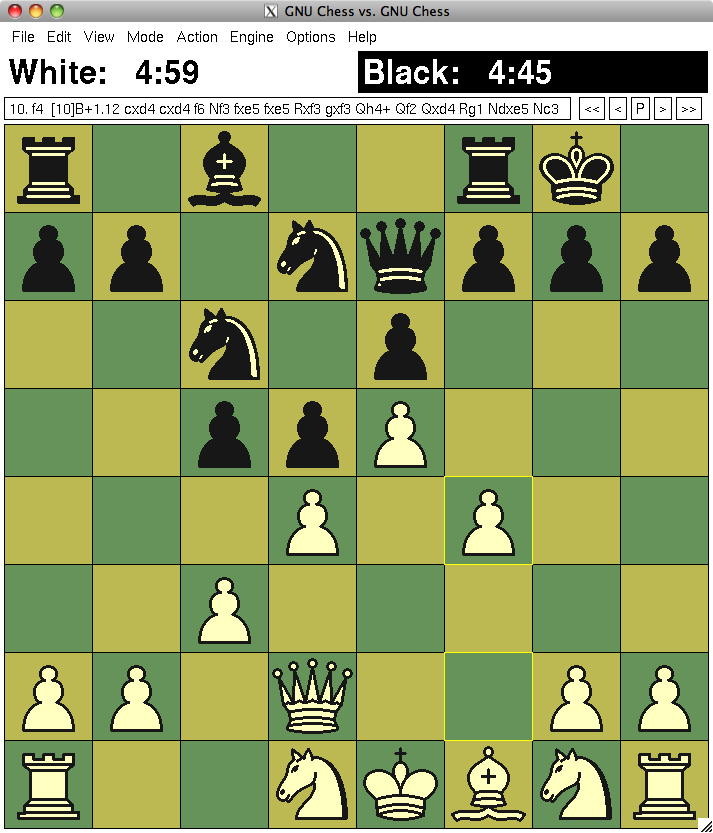
- GNU Chess 6.0.0 running with the XBoard front end, v. 4.1.5.
- Developer: GNU Project
- Initial release: 1984; 42 years ago
- Stable release: 6.3.0 / 21 August 2025
- Operating system: Linux, Unix, macOS, Windows
- Type: Computer chess
- License: 2010 (Note: GPL-3.0-or-later since 2010-01-03, version 5.08.): GPL-3.0-or-later; 1992 (Note: GPL-2.0-or-later since 1992-05-30, version 4.0.43.): GPL-2.0-or-later; 1986: Chess-GPL (Note: GNU Chess General Public License)
- Website: www.gnu.org/software/chess/
- Repository: git.savannah.gnu.org/cgit/chess.git

GNU Chess is a free software chess engine and command-line interface chessboard. The goal of GNU Chess is to serve as a basis for research, and as such it has been used in numerous contexts.

GNU Chess is free software, licensed under the terms of the GNU General Public License version 3 or any later version, and is maintained by collaborating developers. As one of the earliest computer chess programs with full source code available, it is one of the oldest for Unix-based systems and has since been ported to many other platforms.

== Features ==
GNU Chess 6.2.5 is rated at 2661 Elo points on CCRL's 40-moves-in-2-minutes list. On the same list, Fritz 8 was rated at 2665 Elo, and that program in the 2004 Man vs Machine World Team Championship beat grandmasters Sergey Karjakin, Veselin Topalov and reached a draw with Ruslan Ponomariov.

It is often used in conjunction with a GUI program such as XBoard or GNOME Chess, where it is included as the default engine. Initial versions of XBoard's Chess Engine Communication Protocol were based on GNU Chess's command-line interface. Version 6 also supports the Universal Chess Interface (UCI). Since version 6.1 GNU chess supports a graphical mode for terminal emulators.

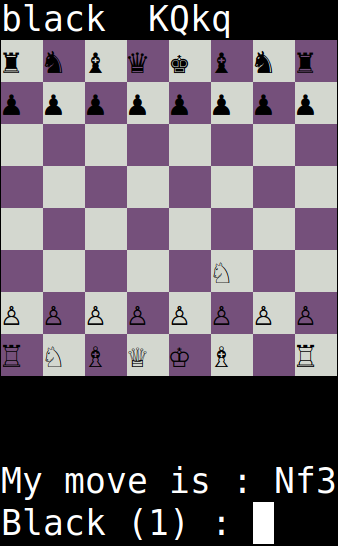
GNU chess terminal graphic mode

== History ==
The first version of GNU Chess was written by Stuart Cracraft. Having started in 1984 in collaboration with Richard Stallman prior to his founding of the GNU Project, GNU Chess became one of the first parts of GNU.

GNU Chess has been enhanced and expanded since. Versions from 2 to 4 were written by John Stanback. Version 5 of GNU Chess was based on the Cobalt chess engine written by Chua Kong-Sian.

In 2011, GNU Chess transitioned to version 6, which is based on Fabien Letouzey's Fruit 2.1 chess engine. According to CEGT version 5.60 of this code base is stronger than Fruit 2.3, the latest version of that chess engine.

== See also ==
- List of open-source video games
- GNU Go
- XBoard
