= Chess Engines Grand Tournament =

Contest for computer chess software

Chess Engines Grand Tournament, also known as CEGT, is an organization that tests computer chess software by playing chess engines against one another and publishing a ratings table.

CEGT routinely tests chess engines in various time controls such as 40/4 (40 moves in 4 minutes, repeating), 40/20 (40 moves in 20 minutes, repeating), and 40/120 (40 moves in 120 minutes, repeating). The 40/120 matches are one of the best computer-chess games freely available online. Instead of starting with a fresh board, CEGT make the engines start from a common chess opening position.

In 2017 the team consisted of seven testers. Starting 2005 the team has run more than 1 million games for 40/20, and more than 2 million games for 40/4 (Blitz). Games include SMP testing.

== See also ==
- Chess engine
- Computer chess
- Internet chess server
- Swedish Chess Computer Association (SSDF)
