= Chess Informant =

Serbian publishing company

Chess Informant, issue No. 97 (2006)

Chess Informant (Serbian: Šahovski Informator) is a publishing company from Belgrade, Serbia, that periodically (since 2012, four volumes per year) produces volumes of a book entitled Chess Informant, as well as the Encyclopaedia of Chess Openings, Encyclopaedia of Chess Endings, Opening Monographs, other print publications, and software (including electronic editions of most print publications). Aleksandar Matanović and Milivoje Molerović founded the company in 1966 for the purpose of offering the rest of the world the sort of access to chess information enjoyed by Soviet players. The company has sold three million books in 150 countries, according to its website.

Chess Informant published two issues per year in 1966–1990, three issues per year in 1991–2011 and four issues per year since 2012. Each issue offers several hundred games or fragments of games from master play, mostly annotated by the players themselves. A board of leading players selects the best games of each issue, and these are republished in the next issue often with more extensive annotations. Each issue since Chess Informant 5 has included a combinations section with problems from recent play. A similar endings section has also become a standard feature.

For two decades prior to the emergence of computer databases, Chess Informant publications were a leading source of games and analysis for serious chess players. The publication routinely appears in the bibliography of texts on specific chess openings and other chess texts. Former world champion Garry Kasparov asserted, "We are all children of Informant" and then explained that his own development as a chess player corresponded with the ascent of Chess Informant's popularity. Other world champions, including Anatoly Karpov, Vladimir Kramnik, and Viswanathan Anand, attest that Informant is central to their tournament preparation. As of 2026, 167 volumes of Informant have been published. Among the contributors have been more than 5,000 chess players including all the world champions from Max Euwe to Anand.

The Chess Informant system of codes for the classification of chess openings, and its system of symbols have set the international standard for organizing chess information and communicating this information across language barriers. The system of codes is explained in ten languages on the front of each issue of Informant, the Encyclopaedia of Chess Openings, and other publications.

On 1 April 2008, Chess Informant issued its one-hundredth issue.

Starting from Volume 113 (2012), Chess Informant has introduced major changes in its structure, including several authors' columns written in English, e.g. "Garry's choice" by Garry Kasparov, "Top Five" by selected top grandmasters, "Labs- theoretical surveys" by ten selected grandmasters, etc.

== See also ==
- List of chess periodicals
