= XBoard =

Graphical user interface for chess games

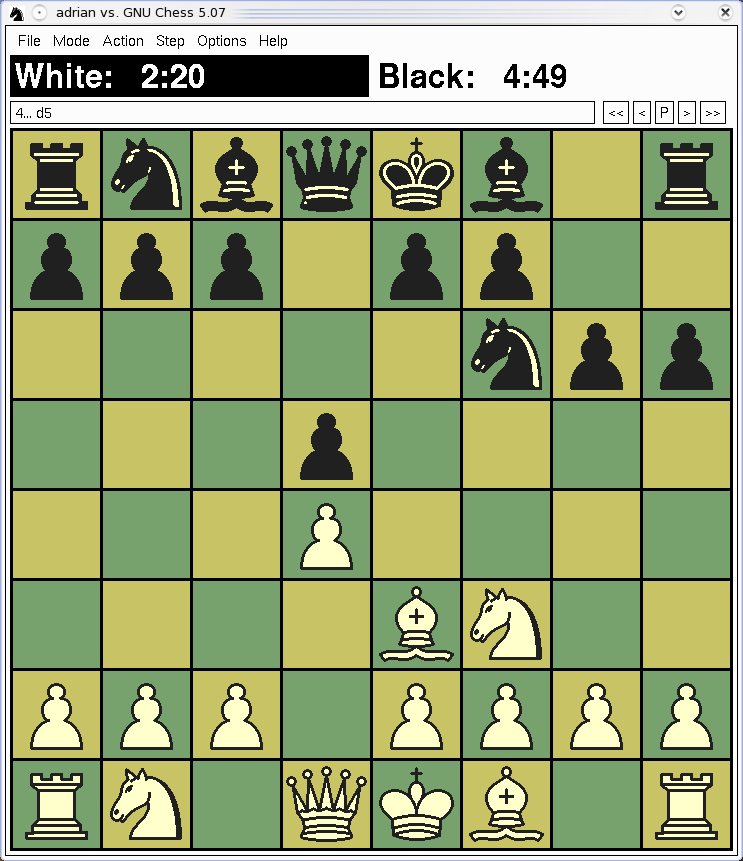
- GNU Chess 5.0.7 on XBoard 4.2.7
- Developer: GNU project
- Stable release: 4.9.1 / 1 August 2016
- Operating system: Linux, FreeBSD, NetBSD, OpenBSD, Microsoft Windows, macOS
- Type: Computer chess
- License: GPL
- Website: XBoard
- Repository: git.savannah.gnu.org/cgit/xboard.git

XBoard is a graphical user interface chessboard for chess engines under the X Window System. It is developed and maintained as free software by the GNU project. WinBoard is a port of XBoard to run natively on Microsoft Windows.

== Overview ==
Originally developed by Tim Mann as a front end for the GNU Chess engine, XBoard eventually came to be described as a graphical user interface for XBoard engines. It also acts as a client for Internet Chess Servers, and e-mail chess, and can allow the user to play through saved games.

XBoard/WinBoard remain updated, and the Chess Engine Communication Protocol has been extended to meet the needs of modern engines (which have features such as hash tables, multi-processing and end-game tables, which could not be controlled through the old protocol).

XBoard/WinBoard also fully support engines that play chess variants, such as Fairy-Max. This means the GUI is able to display a wide range of variants such as xiangqi (Chinese chess), shogi (Japanese chess), makruk (Thai chess), Crazyhouse, Capablanca Chess and many other Western variants on boards of various sizes. It offers a Westernized representation for these games, but the almost limitless configurability of XBoard/WinBoard also allows a high-quality representation of non-Western style games.

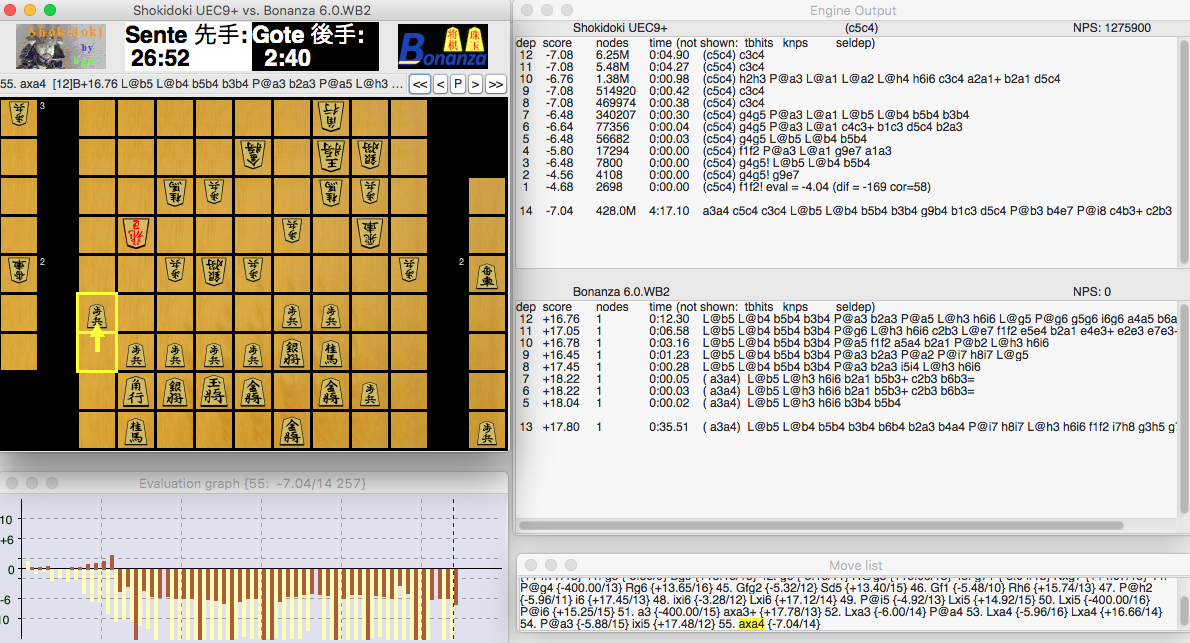
Screenshot of XBoard showing a game of shogi

Another computer chess protocol is the Universal Chess Interface (UCI). XBoard/WinBoard supports this protocol (and its dialects USI and UCCI, which are in common use for shogi and Chinese chess) through adapter programs such as Polyglot and UCI2WB.

Since 2014 there exists a special version of XBoard that better integrates with Apple's OS X. It is distributed from WinBoard forum as an OS X App, including several engines (for chess and many chess variants), and adapters for running engines in non-natively supported protocols. It also contains supporting software for connecting with the popular Internet Chess Servers FICS and ICC for on-line play. XBoard OS X Apps that specifically configure XBoard for oriental-style shogi or xiangqi are also available.

WinBoard is a version of XBoard adapted to MS Windows, and is available in a similar package.

== Fairy-Max ==
Fairy-Max
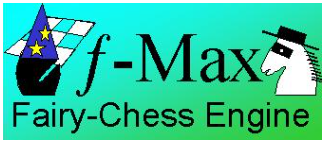
- Fairy-Max logo
- Developer: H.G. Muller
- Initial release: 4.8 / October 18, 2007; 18 years ago
- Stable release: 5.0b / February 19, 2016; 10 years ago
- Written in: C
- Operating system: Windows, Linux, MacOS
- Type: Computer chess
- License: Public Domain
- Website: home.hccnet.nl/h.g.muller/CVfairy.html
- Repository: git.savannah.gnu.org/r/xboard.git

Fairy-Max is a free and open source chess engine which can play orthodox chess as well as chess variants. Among its features is the ability of users to define and use their own custom variant chess pieces for use in games.

Fairy-Max was derived from micro-Max (also developed by H.G. Muller), one of the smallest programs to play complete FIDE chess. Therefore, Fairy-Max versioning started with version number 4.8, the version of micro-Max used.

=== Description ===
The Fairy-Max module is a chess engine only, but is packaged with XBoard, which serves as the graphical user interface. Users can play against the Fairy-Max engine, or play the engine against other engines. It can also be set up to play two armies against each other, both using the Fairy-Max engine, for the purpose of analyzing chess moves, chess variants, or variant chess pieces.

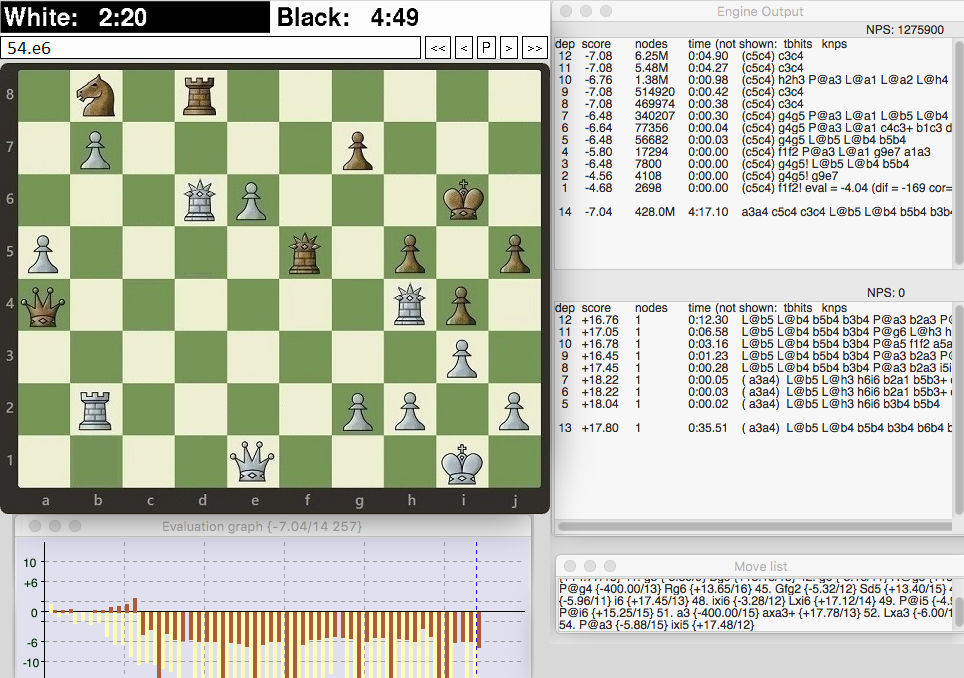
Game depiction showing output from the Fairy-Max chess engine

=== Capabilities ===
Besides classical FIDE chess, Fairy-Max is provided with a large selection of pre-defined games using fairy chess pieces, including shatranj (ancient Iranian chess), xiangqi (Chinese chess), shogi (Japanese chess), makruk (Thai chess), King of the Hill, Capablanca Chess, Courier chess, Berolina chess, Seirawan chess and other chess variants. Users are also able to specify their own board sizes, and define custom chess pieces, so that user-defined chess variants can also be played. Chessboards can be defined with a maximum size of 14 files in width, and 16 ranks in depth.

=== Playing strength ===
The engine's Elo rating fluctuates at around 1900 when playing orthodox chess in CCRL 40/40 chess engine tournament, which roughly corresponds to class A human player.

The author of the program has said "the goal of Fairy-Max is to make an entertaining but beatable opponent to play against in all kind of chess variants."

== See also ==
- Chess engine
- Computer chess
- ChessV (also plays chess variants)
- Variant chess piece
- Chess variants
- List of chess software
