= Chess engine =

Computer program for chess analysis and game

In computer chess, a chess engine is a computer program that analyzes chess or chess variant positions, and generates a move or list of moves that it regards as strongest.

A chess engine is usually a back end with a command-line interface with no graphics or windowing. Engines are usually used with a front end, a windowed graphical user interface such as Chessbase or WinBoard that the user can interact with via a keyboard, mouse or touchscreen. This allows the user to play against multiple engines without learning a new user interface for each, and allows different engines to play against each other.

Many chess engines are now available for mobile phones and tablets, making them more accessible.

== History ==
The meaning of the term "chess engine" has evolved over time. In 1986, Linda and Tony Scherzer entered their program Bebe into the 4th World Computer Chess Championship, running it on "Chess Engine," their brand name for the chess computer hardware made, and marketed by their company Sys-10, Inc. By 1990 the developers of Deep Blue, Feng-hsiung Hsu and Murray Campbell, were writing of giving their program a 'searching engine,' apparently referring to the software rather than the hardware. In December 1991, Computer-schach & Spiele referred to Chessbase's recently released Fritz as a 'Schach-motor,' the German translation for 'chess engine.' By early 1993, Marty Hirsch was drawing a distinction between commercial chess programs such as Chessmaster 3000 or Battle Chess on the one hand, and 'chess engines' such as ChessGenius or his own MChess Pro on the other. In his characterization, commercial chess programs were low in price, had fancy graphics, but did not place high on the SSDF (Swedish Chess Computer Association) rating lists while engines were more expensive, and did have high ratings.

In 1994, Shay Bushinsky was working on an early version of his Junior program. He wanted to focus on the chess playing part rather than the graphics, and so asked Tim Mann how he could get Junior to communicate with Winboard. Tim's answer formed the basis for what became known as the Chess Engine Communication Protocol or Winboard engines, originally a subset of the GNU Chess command line interface.

Also in 1994, Stephen J. Edwards released the Portable Game Notation (PGN) specification. It mentions PGN reading programs not needing to have a "full chess engine." It also mentions three "graphical user interfaces" (GUI): XBoard, pgnRead and Slappy the database.

By the mid-2000s, engines had become so strong that they were able to beat even the best human players. Except for entertainment purposes, especially using engines with limited strength, matches between humans and engines are now rare; engines are increasingly regarded as tools for analysis rather than as opponents.

A 2024 article published in the British Journal of Psychology showed that the introduction of PC- and internet-based chess engines in the 1990s, and more recently neural networks and deep learning, has progressively improved the quality of decisions made by elite chess players. This has had a more pronounced effect on young players and a more gradual effects on established champions.

== Interface protocol ==
Common Winboard engines would include Crafty, ProDeo (based on Rebel), Chenard, Zarkov and Phalanx.

In 1995, Chessbase released a version of their database program including Fritz 4 as a separate engine. This was the first appearance of the Chessbase protocol. Soon after, they added the engines Junior and Shredder to their product line up, including engines in CB protocol as separate programs which could be installed in the Chessbase program or one of the other Fritz style GUI's. Fritz 1-14 were only issued as Chessbase engines, while Hiarcs, Nimzo, Chess Tiger and Crafty have been ported to Chessbase format even though they were UCI or Winboard engines. Recently, Chessbase has begun to include Universal Chess Interface (UCI) engines in their playing programs such as Komodo, Houdini, Fritz 15–16 and Rybka rather than convert them to Chessbase engines.

In 2000, Stefan Meyer-Kahlen and Franz Huber released the Universal Chess Interface, a more detailed protocol that introduced a wider set of features. Chessbase soon after dropped support for Winboard engines, and added support for UCI to their engine GUI's and Chessbase programs. Most of the top engines are UCI these days: Stockfish, Komodo, Leela Chess Zero, Houdini, Fritz 15-16, Rybka, Shredder, Fruit, Critter, Ivanhoe and Ruffian.

From 1998, the German company Millenium 2000 briefly moved from dedicated chess computers into the software market, developing the Millennium Chess System (MCS) protocol for a series of CD's containing ChessGenius or Shredder, but after 2001 ceased releasing new software. A more longstanding engine protocol has been used by the Dutch company, Lokasoft, which eventually took over the marketing of Ed Schröder's Rebel.

== Increasing strength ==
Chess engines increase in playing strength continually. This is partly due to the increase in processing power that enables calculations to be made to ever greater depths in a given time. In addition, programming techniques have improved, enabling the engines to be more selective in the lines that they analyze and to acquire a better positional understanding. A chess engine often uses a vast previously computed opening "book" to increase its playing strength for the first several moves, up to possibly 20 moves or more in deeply analyzed lines.

Some chess engines maintain a database of chess positions, along with previously computed evaluations and best moves—in effect, a kind of "dictionary" of recurring chess positions. Since these positions are pre-computed, the engine merely plays one of the indicated moves in the database, thereby saving computing time, resulting in stronger, faster play.

Some chess engines use endgame tablebases to increase their playing strength during the endgame. An endgame tablebase includes all possible endgame positions with a small amount of material. Each position is conclusively determined as a win, loss, or draw for the player whose turn it is to move, and the number of moves to the end with best play by both sides. The tablebase identifies for every position the move which will win the fastest against an optimal defense, or the move that will lose the slowest against an optimal offense. Such tablebases are available for all chess endgames with seven pieces or fewer (trivial endgame positions are excluded, such as six white pieces versus a lone black king).

When the maneuvering in an ending to achieve an irreversible improvement takes more moves than the horizon of calculation of a chess engine, an engine is not guaranteed to find the best move without the use of an endgame tablebase, and in many cases can fall foul of the fifty-move rule as a result. Many engines use permanent brain (continuing to calculate during the opponent's turn) as a method to increase their strength.

Distributed computing is also used to improve the software code of chess engines. In 2013, the developers of the Stockfish chess playing program started using distributed computing to make improvements in the software code. As of June 2017, a total of more than 745 years of CPU time has been used to play more than 485 million chess games, with the results being used to make small and incremental improvements to the chess-playing software. In 2017, the AlphaZero engine was introduced, which used a deep neural network to evaluate positions, learning in autonomous mode through independent play and self-improvement. AlphaZero won from Stockfish in the same year, after which Stockfish was upgraded by modifying its manually-tuned position evaluator to incorporate neural network-based evaluations. The current form of Stockfish is seen as exceptionally strong and capable of an almost perfect chess game. In 2019, Ethereal author Andrew Grant started the distributed computing testing framework OpenBench, based upon Stockfish's testing framework, and it is now the most widely used testing framework for chess engines.

== Limiting an engine's strength ==
By the late 1990s, the top engines had become so strong that few players stood a chance of winning a game against them. To give players more of a chance, engines began to include settings to adjust or limit their strength. In 2000, when Stefan Meyer-Kahlen and Franz Huber released the Universal Chess Interface protocol they included the parameters uci_limitstrength and uci_elo allowing engine authors to offer a variety of levels rated in accordance with Elo rating, as calibrated by one of the rating lists. Most GUIs for UCI engines allow users to set this Elo rating within the menus. Even engines that have not adopted this parameter will sometimes have an adjustable strength parameter (e.g. Stockfish 11). Engines which have a uci_elo parameter include Houdini, Fritz 15–16, Rybka, Shredder, Hiarcs, Junior, Zappa, and Sjeng. GUIs such as Shredder, Chess Assistant, Convekta Aquarium, Hiarcs Chess Explorer, and Martin Blume's Arena have dropdown menus for setting the engine's uci_elo parameter. The Fritz family GUIs, Chess Assistant, and Aquarium also have independent means of limiting an engine's strength apparently based on an engine's ability to generate ranked lists of moves (called multipv for 'principle variation').

== Comparisons ==
=== Tournaments ===
The results of computer tournaments give one view of the relative strengths of chess engines. However, tournaments do not play a statistically significant number of games for accurate strength determination. In fact, the number of games that need to be played between fairly evenly matched engines, in order to achieve significance, runs into the thousands and is, therefore, impractical within the framework of a tournament. Most tournaments also allow any types of hardware, so only engine/hardware combinations are being compared.

Historically, commercial programs have been the strongest engines. If an amateur engine wins a tournament or otherwise performs well (for example, Zappa in 2005), then it is quickly commercialized. Titles gained in these tournaments garner much prestige for the winning programs, and are thus used for marketing purposes. However, after the rise of volunteer distributed computing projects such as Leela Chess Zero and Stockfish and testing frameworks such as FishTest and OpenBench in the late 2010s, free and open source programs have largely displaced commercial programs as the strongest engines in tournaments.

==== List of tournaments ====
Current tournaments include:

- Top Chess Engine Championship (TCEC)
- Chess.com Computer Chess Championship (CCC)

Historic tournaments include:

- Dutch Open Computer Chess Championship
- Internet Computer Chess Tournament (CCT)
- International Paderborn Computer Chess Championship
- North American Computer Chess Championship
- World Computer Chess Championship (WCCC and WCSC)
  - World Computer Speed Chess Championship

=== Ratings ===
Chess engine rating lists aim to provide statistically significant measures of relative engine strength. These lists play multiple games between engines. Some also standardize the opening books, the time controls, and the computer hardware the engines use, in an attempt to measure the strength differences of the engines only. These lists provide not only a ranking, but also margins of error on the given ratings.

The ratings on the rating lists, although calculated by using the Elo system (or similar rating methods), have no direct relation to FIDE Elo ratings or to other chess federation ratings of human players. Except for some man versus machine games which the SSDF had organized many years ago (when engines were far from today's strength), there is no calibration between any of these rating lists and player pools. Hence, the results which matter are the ranks and the differences between the ratings, and not the absolute values.

Missing from many rating lists are IPPOLIT and its derivatives. Although very strong and open source, there are allegations from commercial software interests that they were derived from a disassembled binary of Rybka. Due to the controversy, all these engines have been blacklisted from many tournaments and rating lists. Rybka in turn was accused of being based on Fruit, and in June 2011, the ICGA formally claimed Rybka was derived from Fruit and Crafty and banned Rybka from the International Computer Games Association World Computer Chess Championship, and revoked its previous victories (2007, 2008, 2009, and 2010). The ICGA received some criticism for this decision. Despite all this, Rybka is still included on many rating lists, such as CCRL and CEGT, in addition to Houdini, a derivative of the IPPOLIT derivative Robbolito, and Fire, a derivative of Houdini. In addition, Fat Fritz 2, a derivative of Stockfish, is also included on most of the rating lists.

==== Differences between rating lists ====
There are a number of factors that vary among the chess engine rating lists:

- Number of games. More games when testing each engine result in higher statistical significance.
- Formulae used to calculate the elo of each engine.
- Time control:
  - Longer time controls are better suited for determining tournament play strength, but also either make testing more time-consuming or the results less statistically significant.
  - Increment time controls are better suited for determining tournament play strength since tournaments usually use increment time controls, but many rating lists use cyclic/repeating time controls instead.
  - Consistent time controls throughout the rating list vs different time controls for each test. The latter results in a smaller statistical significance than the former because different time controls is a potential confounder. This is particularly problematic for CCRL because CCRL uses both cyclic/repeating time controls (40/15) and increment time controls (15"+10') in its CCRL 40/15 list yet maintains both time controls on the same list.
- Opponents used in testing engines.
  - Some rating lists only test an engine against the most recent version of each opponent engine, while other rating lists test an engine against the version(s) of each opponent engine closest in elo to the engine being tested.
  - Most rating lists do not test every engine on the rating list vs every other engine on the rating list in a round-robin tournament format. This causes distortions in the rating lists, especially for CCRL and CEGT.
- Hardware used:
  - Faster hardware with more memory leads to stronger play.
  - 64-bit (vs. 32-bit) hardware and operating systems favor bitboard-based programs
  - Hardware using modern instruction sets such as AVX2 or AVX512 favor engines using vectors and vector intrinsics in their code, common in neural networks.
  - Graphics processing units favor programs with deep neural networks.
  - Multiprocessor vs. single processor hardware.
  - Consistent hardware throughout the rating list vs different hardware for every test. The latter results in a smaller statistical significance than the former because different hardware is a potential confounder. This is particularly problematic for CEGT because multiple testers each with their own unique hardware are involved in testing each engine in CEGT. The same issue arises in CCRL.
- Ponder settings (speculative analysis while the opponent is thinking) aka Permanent Brain.
- Transposition table sizes.
- GUI settings.
- Opening book settings.

These differences affect the results, and make direct comparisons between rating lists difficult.

==== List of rating lists ====
Current rating lists and rating list organizations include:

- Computer Chess Rating Lists (CCRL)
  - CCRL Blitz 2+1
  - CCRL 40/15
  - CCRL FRC
- Chess Engines Grand Tournament (CEGT)
  - CEGT Blitz
  - CEGT 40/20
  - CEGT 40/120
  - CEGT 3"+1'
  - CEGT 5"+3'
  - CEGT 25"+8'
- Mac Chess Engine Rating List (MCERL)
- Ipman Chess
  - Ipman Chess AMD Ryzen 9 7945HX
  - Ipman Chess Intel i9 7980XE
  - Ipman Chess Intel i7 13700H
- SSDF

Historic rating lists and rating list organizations include:

- Computer Chess Rating Lists (CCRL)
  - CCRL 40/2 Archive
- FastGM's Rating List (FGRL)
  - FGRL 4"+2.4'
  - FGRL 30"
- Ipman Chess
  - Ipman Chess i7 970
  - Ipman Chess Intel i7 11800H
  - Ipman Chess i7 2670QM
  - Ipman Chess List i3 M380
  - Ipman Chess i7 5960x
- IPON
- Gambit Rating List (GRL)
- FastGM's Rating List (FGRL)
  - FGRL 1"+0.6'
  - FGRL 10"+6'
  - FGRL 60"+15'
  - FGRL 16 Cores vs RTX 2070
- Anti Draw Rating List (ADRL)
  - ADRL Blitz
  - ADRL 40/120
- Stefan Pohl Computer Chess (SPCC)

=== Test suites ===
Engines can be tested by measuring their performance on specific positions. Typical is the use of test suites where for each given position there is one best move to find. These positions can be geared towards positional, tactical or endgame play. The Nolot test suite, for instance, focuses on deep sacrifices. The BT2450 and BT2630 test suites measure the tactical capability of a chess engine and have been used by REBEL. There is also a general test suite called Brilliancy which was compiled mostly from How to Reassess Your Chess Workbook. The Strategic Test Suite (STS) tests an engine's strategical strength. Another modern test suite is Nightmare II which contains 30 chess puzzles.

== Kasparov versus the World (chess game played with computer assistance) ==
In 1999, Garry Kasparov played a chess game called "Kasparov versus the World" over the Internet, hosted by the MSN Gaming Zone. Both sides used computer (chess engine) assistance. The "World Team" included the participation of over 50,000 people from more than 75 countries, deciding their moves by plurality vote. The game lasted four months, ending after Kasparov's 62nd move when he announced a forced checkmate in 28 moves found with the computer program Deep Junior. The World Team voters resigned on October 22. After the game, Kasparov said: "It is the greatest game in the history of chess. The sheer number of ideas, the complexity, and the contribution it has made to chess make it the most important game ever played."

== Smallest chess engines ==
Since the early days of computer chess, programmers have competed to create the smallest possible chess-playing programs, often aiming to fit the entire engine within extremely limited memory spaces such as a 512-byte boot sector.

David Horne's 1K ZX Chess, released for the ZX81 in 1982, occupied just 672 bytes and held the record for the world's smallest chess program for over 30 years. While it successfully implemented a user interface, artificial intelligence, and most basic movements, it lacked advanced rules such as castling, minor promotions, and en passant.

In January 2015, Olivier Poudade of Red Sector Inc. broke this longstanding record by releasing BootChess, an x86 machine code engine that was originally 487 bytes (later successfully reduced to 468 bytes). Capable of running from a boot sector on Windows, Linux, OS X, and DOS, BootChess utilizes a "TaxiMax" heuristic but still lacks advanced FIDE rules and allows its own king to move into check. This milestone sparked a renewed interest in "sizecoding" chess engines. Soon after, Óscar Toledo Gutiérrez released Toledo Atomchess, which further reduced the size of an x86 chess program, eventually reaching just 326 bytes in 2019.

Further optimization efforts by other developers pushed x86 program sizes even lower. Dmitry Shechtman's LeanChess achieved 288 bytes for DOS, a record that was later broken by Nicholas Tanner's AttoChess, which successfully implemented a playable 16-bit x86 DOS chess engine with a 4-ply recursive minimax search in exactly 272 bytes, being the current record holder.

While these ultra-minimalist engines sacrifice certain chess rules (like castling and en passant) to achieve their incredibly small sizes, other projects aim to retain full FIDE compliance within extreme limits. Notably, H. G. Muller's micro-Max implements all chess rules in under an A4 page of C source code, and plays at an estimated Elo rating of 2000. Similarly, Toledo's Nanochess is a heavily obfuscated C program that provides a complete, capable engine in just 1,257 characters.

== Engines for chess variants ==
Some chess engines have been developed to play chess variants, adding the necessary code to simulate non-standard chess pieces, or to analyze play on non-standard boards. ChessV and Fairy-Max, for example, are both capable of playing variants on a chessboard up to 12×8 in size, such as Capablanca Chess (10×8 board).

For larger boards, however, there are few chess engines that can play effectively, and indeed chess games played on an unbounded chessboard (infinite chess) are virtually untouched by chess-playing software, although theoretically a program using a MuZero-derived algorithm could handle an unbounded state space.

== Graphical user interfaces ==
XBoard/Winboard was one of the earliest graphical user interfaces (GUI). Tim Mann created it to provide a GUI for the GNU Chess engine, but after that, other engines such as Crafty appeared which used the Winboard protocol. Eventually, the program Chessmaster included the option to import other Winboard engines in addition to the King engine which was included.

In 1995, Chessbase began offering the Fritz engine as a separate program within the Chessbase database program and within the Fritz GUI. Soon after, they added the Junior and Shredder engines to their product line up, packaging them within the same GUI as was used for Fritz. In the late 1990s, the Fritz GUI was able to run Winboard engines via an adapter, but after 2000, Chessbase simply added support for UCI engines, and no longer invested much effort in Winboard.

“The Thinking Machine” by Martin Wattenberg and Marek Walczak demonstrates the computer’s thought process while playing chess

In 2000, Stefan Meyer-Kahlen started selling Shredder in a separate UCI GUI of his own design, allowing UCI or Winboard engines to be imported into it.

Convekta's Chess Assistant and Lokasoft's ChessPartner also added the ability to import Winboard and UCI engines into their products. Shane Hudson developed Shane's Chess Information Database, a free GUI for Linux, Mac and Windows. Martin Blume developed Arena, another free GUI for Linux and Windows. Lucas Monge entered the field with the free Lucas Chess GUI. All three can handle both UCI and Winboard engines.

On Android, Aart Bik came out with Chess for Android, another free GUI, and Gerhard Kalab's Chess PGN Master and Peter Osterlund's Droidfish can also serve as GUIs for engines.

The Computer Chess Wiki lists many chess GUIs.

== See also ==
- Chess variants
- Computer chess
- Correspondence chess
- Internet chess server
- List of chess software
- Dietrich Prinz's Chess Program
