= Universal Chess Interface =

Communication protocol for chess software

The Universal Chess Interface (UCI) is an open communication protocol designed by Rudolf Huber and Stefan Meyer-Kahlen that enables chess engines to communicate with user interfaces.

== History ==
The UCI protocol was released in November 2000. Designed by Rudolf Huber and Stefan Meyer-Kahlen, the author of Shredder. UCI rivals the older communication protocol XBoard/WinBoard.

In 2002, the chess software company Chessbase that markets Fritz, began to support UCI.

== Design ==
By design, UCI assigns some tasks to the user interface (i.e., presentation layer) which have traditionally been handled by the engine itself.

Stefan-Meyer Kahlen's UCI protocol in Shredder uses a variation of long algebraic notation for moves. A "nullmove" from an engine to a GUI should be sent as 0000.

=== Examples ===
- e2e4 (white pawn push)
- e7e5 (black pawn push)
- e1g1 (white short castling)
- e7e8q (for promotion)

In the case of Chess 960, castling moves are represented by the King capturing their own corresponding rook.

== Commands ==
There are many commands used to communicate with an engine.

UCI Commands List
Command	Usage	Description	Response
quit	quit	Closes the chess engine	—N/a
uci	uci	Tells the engine to switch to UCI mode	uciok
ucinewgame	ucinewgame	Used to let the engine know that the next position it receives will be from a different game.	—N/a
isready	isready	Used to synchronize the engine. Use after sending a command that might take some time.	readyok
setoption	setoption name <id> [value <x>]	Used to change the internal parameters of a chess engine.	—N/a
position	position [fen <fenstring> | startpos ] moves <move1> .... <movei>	Used to tell the engine to setup the provided position.	—N/a
go	go [infinite | depth <depth> | nodes | mate] searchmoves <move1> .... <movei> ponder wtime <x> btime <x> winc <x> binc <x> movestogo <x> nodes <x> movetime <x> perft <x>	Tells the engine to start calculation.	bestmove <move> ponder <expected>
stop	stop	Tells the engine to halt calculation as soon as possible.	—N/a
ponderhit	ponderhit	Tells the engine that the player has played the expected move.	—N/a

Additional commands can be implemented per engine, the below commands are implemented by the Stockfish chess engine.

Optional UCI Commands
Command	Usage	Description	Response
bench	bench [ttSize] [threads] [limit] [fenFile] [limitType]	Runs a benchmark test on the engine.	Test data
speedtest	speedtest [threads] [hash (MiB)] [runtime (s)]	Measures the speed of the computer running the engine.	Test data
d	d	Prints an ASCII representation of the board in the current state.	ASCII Board
eval	eval	Displays the static evaluation of the board.	Scaled Evaluation
compiler	compiler	Prints information about the engine's compiler.	Compiler info
export_net	export_net [filenameBigNet] [filenameSmallNet]	Exports the currently loaded network into a file.	—N/a
flip	flip	Flips the side to move.	—N/a
help	help	In Stockfish, this command prints information about the chess engine and links to the Github.	Help text.
license	license	Same as help command.	Help text.

== Features ==
The uci_limitstrength parameter tells engines with this feature to play at a lower level. The uci_elo parameter specifies the Elo rating at which the engine will aim to play. Engines that have implemented uci_elo include Delfi, Fritz, Hiarcs, Houdini, Junior, Rybka, Shredder, Sjeng and Stockfish.

== Variants ==
The UCI has been modified to play some other games, and chess variants. Some of these are:

- Universal Shogi Interface (USI), a dialect for shogi;
- Universal Chinese Chess Interface (UCCI), a dialect for xiangqi.

Each of these protocols may also define variants of Portable Game Notation (PGN) and Forsyth–Edwards Notation (FEN).

== See also ==
- Chess Engine Communication Protocol (XBoard protocol)
- Shredder
- XBoard
