= Hydra (chess) =

Chess machine

Hydra was a chess machine, designed by a team with Dr. Christian "Chrilly" Donninger, Dr. Ulf Lorenz, GM Christopher Lutz and Muhammad Nasir Ali. Since 2006 the development team consisted only of Donninger and Lutz. Hydra was under the patronage of the PAL Group and Sheikh Tahnoon Bin Zayed Al Nahyan of Abu Dhabi. The goal of the Hydra Project was to dominate the computer chess world, and finally have an accepted victory over humans.

Hydra represented a potentially significant leap in the strength of computer chess. Design team member Lorenz estimates its FIDE equivalent playing strength to be over Elo 3000, and this is in line with its results against Michael Adams and Shredder 8, the former micro-computer chess champion.

Hydra began competing in 2002 and played its last game in June 2006. In June 2009, Christopher Lutz stated that "unfortunately the Hydra project is discontinued." The sponsors decided to end the project.

== Architecture ==
The Hydra team originally planned to have Hydra appear in four versions: Orthus, Chimera, Scylla and then the final Hydra version – the strongest of them all. The original version of Hydra evolved from an earlier design called Brutus and works in a similar fashion to Deep Blue, utilising large numbers of purpose-designed chips (in this case implemented as a field-programmable gate array or FPGA). In Hydra, there are multiple computers, each with its own FPGA acting as a chess coprocessor. These co-processors enabled Hydra to search enormous numbers of positions per second, making each processor more than ten times faster than an unaided computer.

Hydra ran on a 32-node Intel Xeon with a Xilinx FPGA accelerator card cluster, with a total of 64 gigabytes of RAM. It evaluates about 150,000,000 chess positions per second, roughly the same as the 1997 Deep Blue which defeated Garry Kasparov, but with several times more overall computing power. Whilst FPGAs generally have a lower performance level than ASIC chips, modern-day FPGAs run about as fast as the older ASICs used for Deep Blue. The engine is on average able to evaluate up to a depth of about 18 ply (nine moves by each player), whereas Deep Blue only evaluated to about 12 ply on average. Hydra's search used alpha-beta pruning as well as null-move heuristics.

The Hydra computer was physically located in Abu Dhabi, in the United Arab Emirates, and was usually operated over a high speed optical fiber based network link.

== Tournaments and matches ==
- In July 2002, Brutus finished third in the World Computer Chess Championship in Maastricht, the Netherlands. It won six games, drew two games, and lost one, giving it a score of 7 points out of 9. The loss, against Deep Junior, included a rook sacrifice for very long term compensation, which the additional computing power of Brutus could not help it to understand.
- In November 2003, Brutus finished fourth in the World Computer Chess Championship in Graz, Austria. It won eight games, lost two games, and drew one, giving it a score of 8½ out of 11. This disappointing result left the team to find a new sponsor, which they found in the form of the PAL group.
- In February 2004, Hydra won the 13th IPCCC (International Paderborn Computer Chess Championship) tournament. Hydra scored 6½ out of 7, ahead of Fritz and Shredder.
- In April 2004, Hydra finished second in the International CSVN Tournament in Leiden, the Netherlands. It won five games, lost one game, and drew three, leaving it with 6½ points out of 9, 1½ points behind winner Shredder. A loss out of the opening led to the hiring of GM Christopher Lutz, who made a new opening book.
- In August 2004, at the 14th Abu Dhabi International Chess Festival, Hydra played an eight-game match against the computer program Shredder 8, a multiple-time world computer chess champion. Running on 16 nodes Hydra defeated Shredder 5½ to 2½, winning three games and drawing the rest. In an informal match at the same tournament, Hydra took on International Grandmaster Evgeny Vladimirov of Kazakhstan, and defeated him by a score of 3½ to ½.
- In October 2004, in a man vs. machine contest, Hydra defeated former FIDE world champion Ruslan Ponomariov in both of their games. Ponomariov had an Elo rating of 2710 at the time of the match.
- In February 2005, Hydra won the 14th IPCCC (International Paderborn Computer Chess Championships) tournament. Hydra scored 8 points out of 9 (seven wins and two draws), defeating chess program Shredder again in the process.
- Due to human handler errors and program errors, Hydra did not fare well in the June 2005 PAL/CSS Freestyle Chess Tournament, an online tournament where players are allowed to access any and all resources to them, including computer engines, databases, as well as human grandmasters. Two versions of Hydra participated in the tournament: Hydra Chimera (without human intervention) scored 3½/8, and Hydra Scylla (with human intervention) scored 4/8. Neither version of Hydra qualified for the quarter-finals.
- From June 21 to June 27, 2005, Hydra played a six-game match against Michael Adams, the top British player and ranked seventh in the world. The prize fund was $145,000, paid out on a per game basis: a win netting $25,000, a draw $10,000 to both players. Hydra defeated Adams by a score of 5½ to ½; Adams lost each game except for game 2 which he drew. This version of Hydra was running on half power; only 32 out of 64 nodes were utilized. Adams played against the Scylla version of Hydra.

Position: c8 black rook, f8 black rook, g8 black king, b7 black queen, e7 black bishop, f7 black pawn, g7 black pawn, d6 white rook, f6 black knight, h6 black pawn, d5 black pawn, e5 black pawn, f5 white knight, c4 black pawn, e4 white pawn, c3 white pawn, h3 white pawn, b2 white pawn, f2 white pawn, g2 white pawn, c1 white bishop, d1 white queen, e1 white rook, g1 white king

Position before Hydra played 28. Bxh6!!, leading Adams to resign
- In November 2005, Hydra played 4 games: it beat Rustam Kasimdzhanov, drew with Alexander Khalifman, beat Ruslan Ponomariov and finally drew with Rustam Kasimdzhanov.
- In the April 2006 PAL/CSS Freestyle Chess Tournament Hydra finished first with a score of 5½/7, a full point ahead of the field. This tournament allows for any human or computer aid including teams. All 64 of Hydra's nodes were utilized.
- In the June 2006 PAL/CSS Freestyle Chess Main Tournament Hydra finished tied for fifth-sixteenth.

Hydra was not defeated by an unaided human player in over-the-board play. Hydra has, however, been beaten by humans who had access to other programs during their games; for example, correspondence chess International Grandmaster Arno Nickel beat an older version of Hydra in a two-game correspondence match lasting six months. The 32-node version that played against Adams managed to draw Nickel in their third game, which lasted five months and ended in December 2005.
