= International Paderborn Computer Chess Championship =

The International Paderborn Computer Chess Championship was an annual chess tournament for computer chess programs held from 1991 until 2007. It was organized by the University of Paderborn. The fifth edition in 1995 was also the 13th edition of the World Microcomputer Chess Championship.

== Champions ==
#	Year	Program	Champion
1	1991	Zugzwang	Rainer Feldmann, Peter Mysliwietz, Heiner Matthias
2	1992	Zugzwang	Rainer Feldmann, Peter Mysliwietz, Heiner Matthias
3	1993	Bobby	Hans-Joachim Kraas, Günther Schrüfer
4	1994	Schach 3.0	Matthias Engelbach, Thomas Kreitmair
5	1995	MChess Pro 5.0	Martin Hirsch
6	1997	Zugzwang	Rainer Feldmann, Peter Mysliwietz, Heiner Matthias
7	1998	Nimzo98	Christian Donninger
8	1999	P.ConNerS	Ulf Lorenz
9	2000	Shredder	Stefan Meyer-Kahlen
10	2001	Shredder	Stefan Meyer-Kahlen
11	2002	Shredder	Stefan Meyer-Kahlen
12	2003	Fritz	Frans Morsch, Mathias Feist
13	2004	Hydra	Christian Donninger, Alex Kure, Ulf Lorenz
14	2005	Hydra	Christian Donninger, Alex Kure, Ulf Lorenz
15	2005	Rybka	Vasik Rajlich
16	2006	Rybka	Vasik Rajlich
17	2007	HIARCS	Mark Uniacke
