= Pocket Fritz =

Pocket Fritz is a chess playing program for Pocket PC personal digital assistants (PDAs).

Pocket Fritz 1 was released in 2001. The game uses a port of Shredder chess engine. Pocket Fritz 2 was released in 2002. In 2006, Pocket Fritz 1 and 2 lost the online ability to search positions on Chessbase servers. Pocket Fritz 3 was released in 2008 and used Hiarcs 12 as the engine. The successor Pocket Fritz 4 was released in 2009 and uses Hiarcs 13 as engine.

== Copa Mercosur tournament ==
The Pocket Fritz 4 won the Copa Mercosur tournament, a category 6 tournament in Buenos Aires, Argentina, with nine wins and one draw on August 4–14, 2009. The Pocket Fritz 4 achieved a performance rating of 2898. The Pocket Fritz 4 was running on the mobile phone HTC Touch HD.
