= Frederic Friedel =

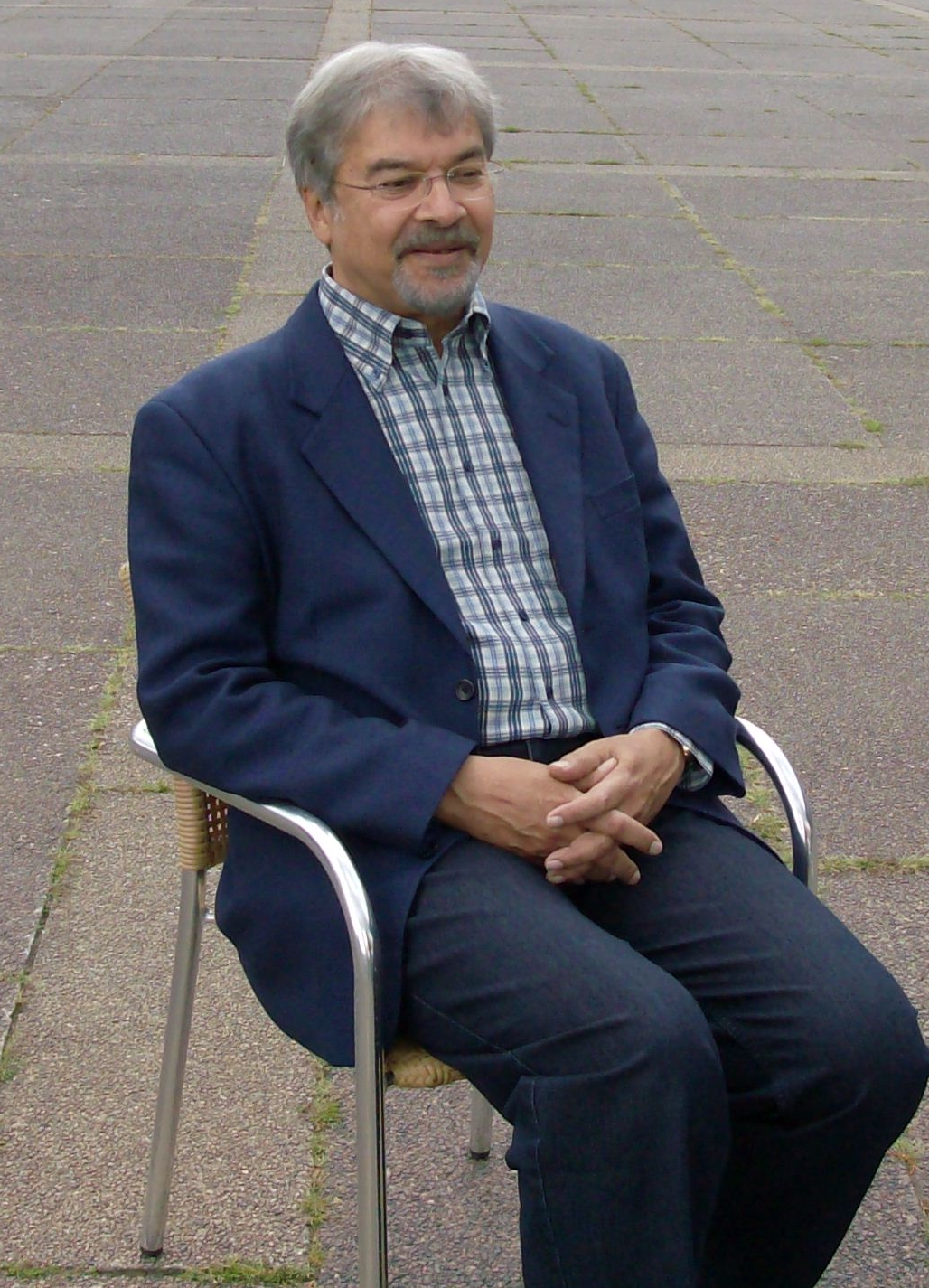
Friedel in 2008

Frederic Alois Friedel (born 1945) studied Philosophy and Linguistics at the University of Hamburg. He joined the American sceptical society CSICOP (now the Committee for Skeptical Inquiry). In 1985, he met Garry Kasparov and soon after that co-founded the chess database company ChessBase.

From 1983 to 2004, he edited the biggest computer chess magazine in the world, Computer-Schach & Spiele, which recently became an online publication. Friedel served as an advisor to Kasparov during his matches with Deep Blue in 1996 and 1997.
