= Monty Newborn =

Retired professor of computer science

Monroe "Monty" Newborn (born May 21, 1938), former chairman of the Computer Chess Committee of the Association for Computing Machinery, is a professor emeritus of computer science at McGill University in Montreal (formerly professor of electrical engineering at Columbia University). He briefly served as president of the International Computer Chess Association and co-wrote a computer chess program named Ostrich in the 1970s.

== Biography ==
Monty Newborn received his Ph.D. in Electrical Engineering from The Ohio State University in 1967. He was an assistant professor and associate professor at Columbia University in the Department of Electrical Engineering and Computer Science from 1967 to 1975. In 1975, he joined the School of Computer Science at McGill University and has been with the School since then, serving as its director from 1976 to 1983. He was the chairman of the ACM Computer Chess Committee since the early 1980s. His chess program, Ostrich, competed in five world championships dating back to 1974. He served as president of the International Computer Chess Association from 1983 to 1986. He retired from the faculty of McGill University in 2008.

A notable quote by Newborn on the science of chess AI programming occurred in 2006: “I don’t know what one could get out of it at this point. The science is done,” Monty Newborn, Dec. 2006 in reference to world champion Vladimir Kramnik’s loss to Deep Fritz, 4-2, and the prospect of further human-computer matches. Newborn was belatedly correct; as of 2021, that was the last serious attempt by a world class player to defeat a top chess machine/program.

=== Bibliography ===
- Beyond Deep Blue: Chess in the Stratosphere. Springer-Verlag, 2011
- Deep Blue: An Artificial Intelligence Milestone. Springer-Verlag, 2003
- Automated Theorem Proving: Theory and Practice. Springer-Verlag, 2001
- Deep Blue: Computer Chess Comes of Age. Springer-Verlag, 1997
- How Computers Play Chess. with D. Levy, WH. Freeman, NY, 1991
- All About Chess and Computers. with D. Levy, Computer Sci Press, Potomac, MD, 1982
- More Chess and Computers. with D. Levy, Computer Sci Press, Potomac, MD, 1980
- Computer Chess. Academic Press, NY, 1975
