= Mieses Opening =

Chess opening

Position: a8 black rook, b8 black knight, c8 black bishop, d8 black queen, e8 black king, f8 black bishop, g8 black knight, h8 black rook, a7 black pawn, b7 black pawn, c7 black pawn, d7 black pawn, e7 black pawn, f7 black pawn, g7 black pawn, h7 black pawn, d3 white pawn, a2 white pawn, b2 white pawn, c2 white pawn, e2 white pawn, f2 white pawn, g2 white pawn, h2 white pawn, a1 white rook, b1 white knight, c1 white bishop, d1 white queen, e1 white king, f1 white bishop, g1 white knight, h1 white rook
- Moves: 1.d3
- ECO: A00
- Named after: Jacques Mieses
- Synonym: Valencia Opening

The Mieses Opening is a chess opening that begins with the move:

1. d3

The opening is named after the German-British grandmaster Jacques Mieses. It is considered an irregular opening, so it is classified under the A00 code in the Encyclopaedia of Chess Openings.

== Description ==
White's 1.d3 releases their c1-bishop and makes a modest claim for the centre, but since it does not stake out as large a share of the centre as 1.d4 does, it is not a popular opening move. Of the twenty possible first moves for White, it ranks tenth in popularity. Nevertheless, since 1...d6 is playable by Black against any opening move from White, the corresponding move is playable by White as well. Its ability to transpose into a King's Indian Attack setup is also important to consider. Black has many reasonable responses, such as 1...e5, 1...d5, 1...c5, 1...Nf6, and 1...g6.

The most famous use of this opening was in the third game in the Deep Blue versus Garry Kasparov match in 1997. Kasparov believed that the computer would play the opening poorly if it had to rely on its own skills rather than on its opening book. The game was drawn. It had been previously used by David Levy in a 1984 prize match against Cray Blitz, which Levy won.

== Example games ==
Position: a8 black rook, b8 black rook, d8 black bishop, h8 black king, f7 black pawn, g7 black pawn, h7 black bishop, a6 black pawn, c6 black knight, d6 black pawn, f6 black knight, h6 black pawn, c5 black pawn, d5 white knight, f5 white pawn, c4 white pawn, e4 white pawn, c3 white knight, d3 white pawn, a2 white rook, d2 white bishop, h2 white pawn, d1 white bishop, f1 white rook, g1 white king

Position after 29...Nc6

Garry Kasparov vs. Deep Blue, game 3, May 1997
1.d3 e5 2.Nf3 Nc6 3.c4 Nf6 4.a3 d6 5.Nc3 Be7 6.g3 0-0 7.Bg2 Be6 8.0-0 Qd7 9.Ng5 Bf5 10.e4 Bg4 11.f3 Bh5 12.Nh3 Nd4 13.Nf2 h6 14.Be3 c5 15.b4 b6 16.Rb1 Kh8 17.Rb2 a6 18.bxc5 bxc5 19.Bh3 Qc7 20.Bg4 Bg6 21.f4 exf4 22.gxf4 Qa5 23.Bd2 Qxa3 24.Ra2 Qb3 25.f5 Qxd1 26.Bxd1 Bh7 27.Nh3 Rfb8 28.Nf4 Bd8 29.Nfd5 Nc6 (diagram) 30.Bf4 Ne5 31.Ba4 Nxd5 32.Nxd5 a5 33.Bb5 Ra7 34.Kg2 g5 35.Bxe5+ dxe5 36.f6 Bg6 37.h4 gxh4 38.Kh3 Kg8 39.Kxh4 Kh7 40.Kg4 Bc7 41.Nxc7 Rxc7 42.Rxa5 Rd8 43.Rf3 Kh8 44.Kh4 Kg8 45.Ra3 Kh8 46.Ra6 Kh7 47.Ra3 Kh8 48.Ra6 ½–½

== Named variations ==
- 1.d3 c5 2.Nc3 Nc6 3.g3 is the Venezolana.
- 1.d3 e5 is the Reversed Rat; 2.Nd2 becomes the Valencia Variation.
- 1.d3 g6 2.g4 is the Spike Deferred or the Myers Spike Attack.

== See also ==
- List of chess openings
- List of chess openings named after people
