= Shredder (software) =

Computer chess engine, 1993–2016

- Original author: Stefan Meyer-Kahlen
- Release: 1993; 33 years ago
- Stable release: 13 / November 22, 2016; 9 years ago
- Type: Chess engine
- License: Proprietary
- Website: www.shredderchess.com

Shredder is a commercial chess engine and graphical user interface (GUI) developed in Germany by Stefan Meyer-Kahlen in 1993. Shredder won the World Microcomputer Chess Championship in 1996 and 2000, the World Computer Chess Championship in 1999 and 2003, the World Computer Speed Chess Championship in 2002, 2003, 2004, 2005, and 2007, and the World Chess Software Championship in 2010.

The Shredder engine version 10.0 was released in June 2006. Version 11.0 was released in October 2007. Version 12 was released in January 2010. The "Deep" version takes advantage of multiple CPUs or multiple core CPUs. Version 13 was released on 30 October 2016. Version 13 is about 300 Elo better than Version 12. Version 14 was released in August 2026, purported to be 425 elo stronger than its predecessor, likely in self play. It launched with a neural net.

Shredder is one of the few commercial chess programs which is available not only for Windows and Mac OS, but also for Linux. Shredder is also available on the iPhone, the iPad and Android. GNOME Chess is used as the graphical front-end for Shredder.

== Competition results ==
Shredder has participated in a number of computer chess tournaments since its inception. The following events are the tournaments in which Shredder has won.

Year	Location	Title
1996	Jakarta	Micro Computer World Champion
1999	Paderborn	Micro Computer World Champion
1999	Paderborn	Computer Chess World Champion
2000	London	17th World Micro Computer World Champion
2001	Maastricht	Micro Computer World Champion Single CPU
2002	Maastricht	Blitz World Champion
2003	Graz	Computer Chess World Champion
2003	Graz	Blitz World Champion
2004	Tel Aviv	Blitz World Champion
2005	Reykjavík	Blitz World Champion
2006	Mainz	Chess960 World Champion
2007	Amsterdam	Blitz World Champion
2010	Kanazawa	Chess Software World Champion
2013	Yokohama	Blitz World Champion
2015	Leiden	Chess Software World Champion

== See also ==
- Computer chess
- Fischer random chess
- Universal Chess Interface
- World Computer Chess Championship
- Top Chess Engine Championship
