= Chess opening book =

Any book on chess openings

A chess opening book is a book on chess openings. This is by far the most common type of literature on chess. These books describe many major lines, like the Sicilian Defence, Ruy Lopez, and Queen's Gambit, as well as many minor variations of the main lines.

== Types ==
There are several types of opening manuals:

1. Manuals dealing with one specific opening – Often these manuals have highly optimistic titles, like Black to Play and Win with 1...g6 (Andrew Soltis), but some are more modest: Starting out: the King's Indian (Joe Gallagher). In general, these books are the most accessible to the general reader, and cover the most material for individual opening systems (though some also cover openings in general).
2. Manuals giving a system or repertoire – These manuals discuss two or more opening systems, often related by similar tactical themes, pawn structures, or strategic aims. The aim is generally to get the player to the middle game with a playable position without too much trouble, no matter what the opposing player does.
3. Manuals giving general opening advice and guidance – Possibly the most famous example of this type of manual (in English) is Reuben Fine's The Ideas Behind the Chess Openings. This type of book does not analyze any opening system to much depth, but teaches the ideas that will help its reader understand opening play.
4. Encyclopedic manuals that aim to be comprehensive – These manuals, from the five volume Encyclopedia of Chess Openings (ECO) to the single volume works like Nunn's Chess Openings (NCO) and Modern Chess Openings (MCO) by Nick de Firmian and Walter Korn aim to cover as many opening systems as possible at the expense of understanding the ideas behind the opening. Usually, at the end of a sequence of moves provided in a theory table, the reader is told that one side stands slightly better than the other. However no information is given on what that assessment is based on or how to proceed in the game. Historically, the prototype for this style of opening book was the German Handbuch des Schachspiels (also known as the "Bilguer Handbuch"), first published in 1843, which pioneered the use of theory tables. It remained a standard reference work until the emergence of MCO in the early twentieth century.
5. DVD demonstrating the openings – These DVDs are the modern idea of describing the main ideas and themes of the openings. Those are explained by strong masters, using video to explain as a teacher performs the principles.

== General chess opening books ==
These books cover a wide variety of chess openings. They are in English, except that the Encyclopedia of Chess Openings has minimal text but instead uses universal symbols to annotate moves and ideas that can be understood in many languages (see Punctuation (chess)).

- How to Play the Opening in Chess. 1993. Raymond Keene and David Levy. ISBN 0-8050-2937-0.
- The Encyclopedia of Chess Openings, five volumes, Chess Informant, Belgrade.
- Batsford Chess Openings 2. 1989, 1994. Garry Kasparov and Raymond Keene. New York, New York: Henry Holt and Company. ISBN 0-8050-3409-9.
- Nunn's Chess Openings. 1999. John Nunn (Editor), Graham Burgess, John Emms, & Joe Gallagher. ISBN 1-85744-221-0.
- Modern Chess Openings, 15th edition (MCO-15). 2008. Nick de Firmian. ISBN 978-0-8129-3682-7.
- Fundamental Chess Openings, Paul van der Sterren, 2009, Gambit, ISBN 978-1-906454-13-5.
- Mastering the Chess Openings, four volumes, John Watson, 2007, Gambit.
- Chess Opening Essentials, four volumes, Stefan Djuric, Dimitri Komarov, & Claudio Pantaleoni, 2008, New in Chess.

== See also ==
- Modern Chess Openings
- Encyclopaedia of Chess Openings
- List of chess books
- List of chess openings
- Chess endgame literature
