= Ply (game theory) =

Game theory term

In two-or-more-player sequential games, a ply is one turn taken by one of the players. The word is used to clarify what is meant when one might otherwise say "turn".

The word "turn" can be a problem since it means different things in different traditions. For example, in standard chess terminology, one move consists of a turn by each player; therefore a ply in chess is a half-move. Thus, after 20 moves in a chess game, 40 plies have been completed—20 by white and 20 by black. In the game of Go, by contrast, a ply is the normal unit of counting moves; so for example to say that a game is 250 moves long is to imply 250 plies.

In poker with n players the word "street" is used for a full betting round consisting of n plies; each dealt card may sometimes also be called a "street". For instance, in heads up Texas hold'em, a street consists of 2 plies, with possible plays being check/raise/call/fold: the first by the player at the big blind, and the second by the dealer, who posts the small blind; and there are 4 streets: preflop, flop, turn, river (the latter 3 corresponding to community cards). The terms "half-street" and "half-street game" are sometimes used to describe, respectively, a single bet in a heads up game, and a simplified heads up poker game where only a single player bets.

The word "ply" used as a synonym for "layer" goes back to the 15th century. Arthur Samuel first used the term in its game-theoretic sense in his seminal paper on machine learning in checkers in 1959, but with a slightly different meaning: the "ply", in Samuel's terminology, is actually the depth of analysis ("Certain expressions were introduced which we will find useful. These are: Ply, defined as the number of moves ahead, where a ply of two consists of one proposed move by the machine and one anticipated reply by the opponent").

In computing, the concept of a ply is important because one ply corresponds to one level of the game tree. The Deep Blue chess computer which defeated Kasparov in 1997 would typically search to a depth of between six and sixteen plies to a maximum of forty plies in some situations.

== See also ==
- Minimax algorithm
