= Clash of Blames =

Chess match between Vladimir Kramnik and José Martínez Alcántara

- Guild Esports, Shoreditch, London, United Kingdom
- 19–21 August 2024
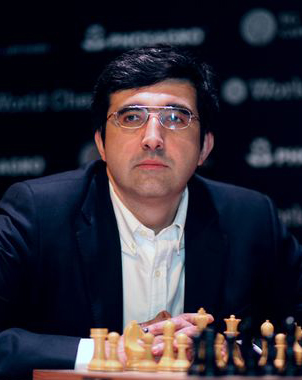
	(FIDE) Vladimir Kramnik	(Mexico) José Martínez Alcántara
19	Scores	17
	Born 25 June 1975; 49 years old	Born 31 January 1999; 25 years old
	Rating: 2691	Rating: 2676

Clash of Blames was a high-profile chess event organised by World Chess Plc (LSE: CHSS) from 19 to 21 August 2024 in London. It was a blitz chess rematch between former World Champion Vladimir Kramnik and Grandmaster José Martínez Alcántara (also known as "Jospem"), and sought to address controversies over cheating and fair play in online chess.

== Background ==
The event followed an earlier match called Clash of Claims, held in June 2024 in Madrid, where Martínez defeated Kramnik 14.5–11.5 in a hybrid format. That contest was controversial: Kramnik raised concerns about technical problems during the online portion, including clock synchronisation and software updates.

Following criticism from the chess community, World Chess renamed the rematch Clash of Blames. The title referenced the disputes over cheating and responsibility in the digital era.

== Format ==
The match lasted three days (19–21 August 2024) with a total of 36 games. Each day included six online games and six over-the-board (OTB) games. The time control was blitz: 3 minutes plus 2 seconds increment per move.

The OTB games were played at Guild Esports in Shoreditch, London, while the online games took place on the official FIDE Online Arena platform operated by World Chess.

Fair play measures included the involvement of security company Pinkerton, which oversaw anti-cheating protocols such as metal detectors and technical monitoring.

== Result ==
Clash of Blames 2024
	Rating	1	2	3	4	5	6	7	8	9	10	11	12	13	14	15	16	17	18	19	20	21	22	23	24	25	26	27	28	29	30	31	32	33	34	35	36	Score
(FIDE) Vladimir Kramnik	2691	1	0	½	0	0	1	½	1	0	1	0	0	1	½	½	1	0	1	½	½	½	½	½	0	1	1	1	½	1	0	1	1	0	0	0	1	19
(Mexico) José Martínez Alcántara	2676	0	1	½	1	1	0	½	0	1	0	1	1	0	½	½	0	1	0	½	½	½	½	½	1	0	0	0	½	0	1	0	0	1	1	1	0	17

Kramnik won the match narrowly, by 19–17. Martínez had been leading earlier but was overtaken on the final day. Reports noted that Martínez played despite the recent death of his mother, after declining an offer to postpone the match.

== Reception ==
Supporters saw the event as an important experiment in addressing online cheating, combining hybrid formats with independent fair-play oversight. Critics questioned whether the technical issues of the first match had been adequately addressed, and whether the marketing of the event overshadowed sporting considerations.

The match has been described as significant for highlighting both the possibilities and limitations of hybrid online-OTB competitions.
