= Clash of Claims =

Chess match between Vladimir Kramnik and José Martínez Alcántara

- Casino de Gran Via, Madrid, Spain
- 7–9 June 2024
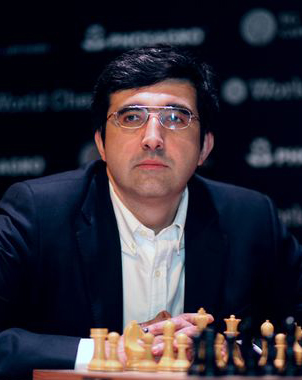
	(FIDE) Vladimir Kramnik	(Mexico) José Martínez Alcántara
11½	Scores	14½
	Born 25 June 1975; 48 years old	Born 31 January 1999; 25 years old
	Rating: 2664	Rating: 2703

Clash of Claims was a blitz chess match held from 7 to 9 June 2024 in Madrid. It was a match between former World Champion Vladimir Kramnik and Grandmaster José Martínez Alcántara (known online as "Jospem"), and sought to address controversies over cheating and fair play in online chess.

== Background ==
Kramnik had previously stated his beliefs in late 2023 that cheating in online chess was much more prevalent than what most people expected. In March 2024, he resigned against Martínez after only one move in a Titled Tuesday event, causing speculation that he believed Martínez to be cheating.

The match was organized by David Martínez, who invited Kramnik and José Martínez to play a match due to their then-identical FIDE blitz ratings of 2703 in February 2024. Commentary was provided by David Martínez and Pepe Cuenca in Spanish, and Levy Rozman in English.

== Format ==
The match was initially composed of 36 blitz games (3 minutes with a 2-second increment), with half of them being played over-the-board and half being played on laptops at the venue. Kramnik requested that new laptops were unboxed live every day for the online games, and that fair play officers were onsite during the games.

== Result ==
Clash of Claims 2024
	Rating	1	2	3	4	5	6	7	8	9	10	11	12	13	14	15	16	17	18	19	20	21	22	23	24	25	26	27	28	Score
(Mexico) José Martínez Alcántara	2703	½	1	0	0	½	1	0	0	0	0	½	½	½	0	1	1	0	½	1	1	1	0	1	½	1	½	½	1	14.5
(FIDE) Vladimir Kramnik	2664	½	0	1	1	½	0	0	0	1	1	½	½	½	1	0	0	1	½	0	0	0	1	0	½	0	½	½	0	11.5

- The results of Games 7 and 8 were annulled. Both were played online; one of these was won by Martínez and the other was a draw.

The match ended early after 28 games were played (though the results of only 26 games were counted) due to Kramnik's complaints regarding technical issues in the online games; he stated that his laptop was running Windows updates as the games were taking place and caused clock desynchronization.

Martínez won the match 14.5–11.5, losing 6.5–7.5 over the board but winning 8–4 online. Kramnik claimed that the technical issues invalidated the result, and that the lag and server issues made it hard for him to focus on chess, deeming the match as an "experiment that failed". However, he praised Martínez as "a very nice guy, a gentleman" and "a very good player".

== Reception ==
Levon Aronian stated that the match was exciting and showcased the difference between online and over-the-board chess. Hikaru Nakamura praised Martínez's performance, but expressed disappointment with Kramnik's conduct and behavior.

A rematch titled Clash of Blames would later be played in London in August 2024, with Kramnik winning the match.
