= Vladimir Belikov (chess player) =

Russian chess grandmaster (born 1971)

Personal information
- Native name: Владимир Станиславович Беликов
- Born: August 2, 1971 (age 55) Voronezh, Russian SFSR, Soviet Union

Chess career
- Country: Russia
- Title: Grandmaster (2000)
- FIDE rating: 2479 (November 2026)
- Peak rating: 2578 (October 2007)

Vladimir Stanislavovich Belikov (Russian: Владимир Станиславович Беликов; born 2 August 1971) is a Russian chess Grandmaster and coach.

== Career ==
Belikov was awarded the International Master (IM) title in 1992 and the Grandmaster (GM) title in 2000.

Representing the Soviet Union, he participated in the 3rd Telechess Olympiad, reaching the semi-finals. Playing for the CSKA Moscow team, he competed in three Russian Team Championships (1992, 1994, and 1995), winning team bronze medals in 1992 and 1994, as well as individual gold medals on board five in both 1994 and 1995.

Belikov has worked as a trainer for former World Champion Vladimir Kramnik. He resides in Voronezh.

His peak Elo rating was 2578 in October 2007.

== Tournament results ==
- 1992: Russian Team Championship in Podolsk (4½/10; team bronze)
- 1994: Russian Team Championship in Kolontayevo (6/9; individual gold on board 5, team bronze)
- 1995: Russian Team Championship in Kazan (4/7; individual gold on board 5)
