= Matvey Galchenko =

Russian chess player (born 2000)

Personal information
- Born: June 21, 2000 (age 26) Murmansk, Russia

Chess career
- Country: Russia (until 2023); FIDE (since 2023)
- Title: International Master (2020)
- FIDE rating: 2440 (November 2026)
- Peak rating: 2449 (November 2022)

Matvey Evgenievich Galchenko is a Russian chess player.

== Chess career ==
In December 2023, he drew attention to Vladimir Kramnik having played on Chess.com using Denis Khismatullin's account, resulting in Kramnik being banned from prize tournaments.

In October 2024, he won the Russian Blitz Championships, finishing a half-point ahead of grandmasters Nikita Afanasiev, Ivan Zemlyanskii, and Maxim Matlakov. Later that month, he played for the Central Park Tower team (alongside Andrey Esipenko, Haik M. Martirosyan, David Paravyan, and Rudik Makarian) in the Russian Rapid Team Championships, where the team were the champions.
