= World Chess =

Global chess organization

World Chess Plc
- Formerly: Agon Limited
- Type: Public
- Traded as: LSE: CHSS
- Industry: Chess, Media, Technology
- Founded: 2012
- Founders: Andrew Paulson, Ilya Merenzon
- Headquarters: London, United Kingdom
- Key people: Ilya Merenzon (CEO)
- Website: worldchess.com

World Chess Plc (formerly Agon Limited) is a global chess organization and media company, incorporated in the United Kingdom. It is the official commercial partner of the International Chess Federation (FIDE) and operator of the FIDE Online Arena, the only platform where players can earn official online ratings recognized by FIDE.

== History ==
The company was founded in 2012 under the name Agon Limited by Andrew Paulson and Ilya Merenzon. Agon was established to manage the commercial rights to the World Chess Championship cycle and other top FIDE events, following agreements with federation.

In its early years, Agon organized high-profile tournaments including Candidates Matches and World Championship events. In 2016, the company adopted the World Chess brand to align more closely with its global chess initiatives, including event management, merchandising, and digital services.

== Major events ==
World Chess has organized and promoted a number of top-level international chess competitions under its agreements with FIDE:

- 2012–2014: Agon took over the commercial organization of World Chess Championship events, starting with the 2013 Candidates Tournament in London.
- 2016: Organized the World Chess Championship match between Magnus Carlsen and Sergey Karjakin, held in New York City. The match introduced a new design for the playing set, developed by Pentagram.
- 2018: Hosted the World Chess Championship match between Magnus Carlsen and Fabiano Caruana in London.
- Candidates Tournaments: World Chess staged Candidates events in Moscow (2016) and Berlin (2018), bringing together the top challengers to compete for the right to face the reigning World Champion.
- In 2024, World Chess staged Clash of Blames in London, an online-offline face off between former World Champion Vladimir Kramnik and GM Jose Martinez (Jospem) after Kramnik challenged his opponent in an alleged online chess cheating dispute.

These events were broadcast online and marked a shift toward presenting chess with higher production values, new branding, and a broader media strategy.

== Public listing ==
In December 2022, World Chess Plc was admitted to trading on the London Stock Exchange with the ticker symbol CHSS, becoming one of the few chess-focused companies to be publicly listed. The listing was intended to provide funding for the expansion of its digital platform, ChessArena.com, the development of physical chess clubs, and broader chess media projects.
