= David Martínez (chess player) =

Spanish chess player (born 1981)

Personal information
- Born: June 30, 1981 (age 45) Madrid, Spain

Chess career
- Country: Spain
- Title: International Master (2006)
- Peak rating: 2454 (January 2007)

David "Divis" Martínez Martin is a Spanish chess player and coach of several Spanish players including David Anton Guijarro and Sabrina Vega. He was also director of chess24 chess platform in Spanish, and a well known Spanish chess streamer and chess commentator.

== Chess career ==
In June 2024, he organized the "Clash of Claims" event in Madrid, which was a match between former World Champion Vladimir Kramnik and grandmaster José Martínez Alcántara.

In October 2024, he teamed up with his commentary partner Pepe Cuenca in the Team Chess Battle, where they made it to the finals and defeated Eric Rosen and Nemo Zhou to win the entire event.

He is the coach of grandmaster David Antón Guijarro, Sabrina Vega (8 times Woman Spanish Chess Champion) and the Spanish women's team. He also works as Chess.com's international partnerships manager.

In the 2024 Chess Olympic Games, he was the captain of the Spanish Absolute Team.
