= Comparison of top chess players throughout history =

Comparison of the best chess players throughout the years

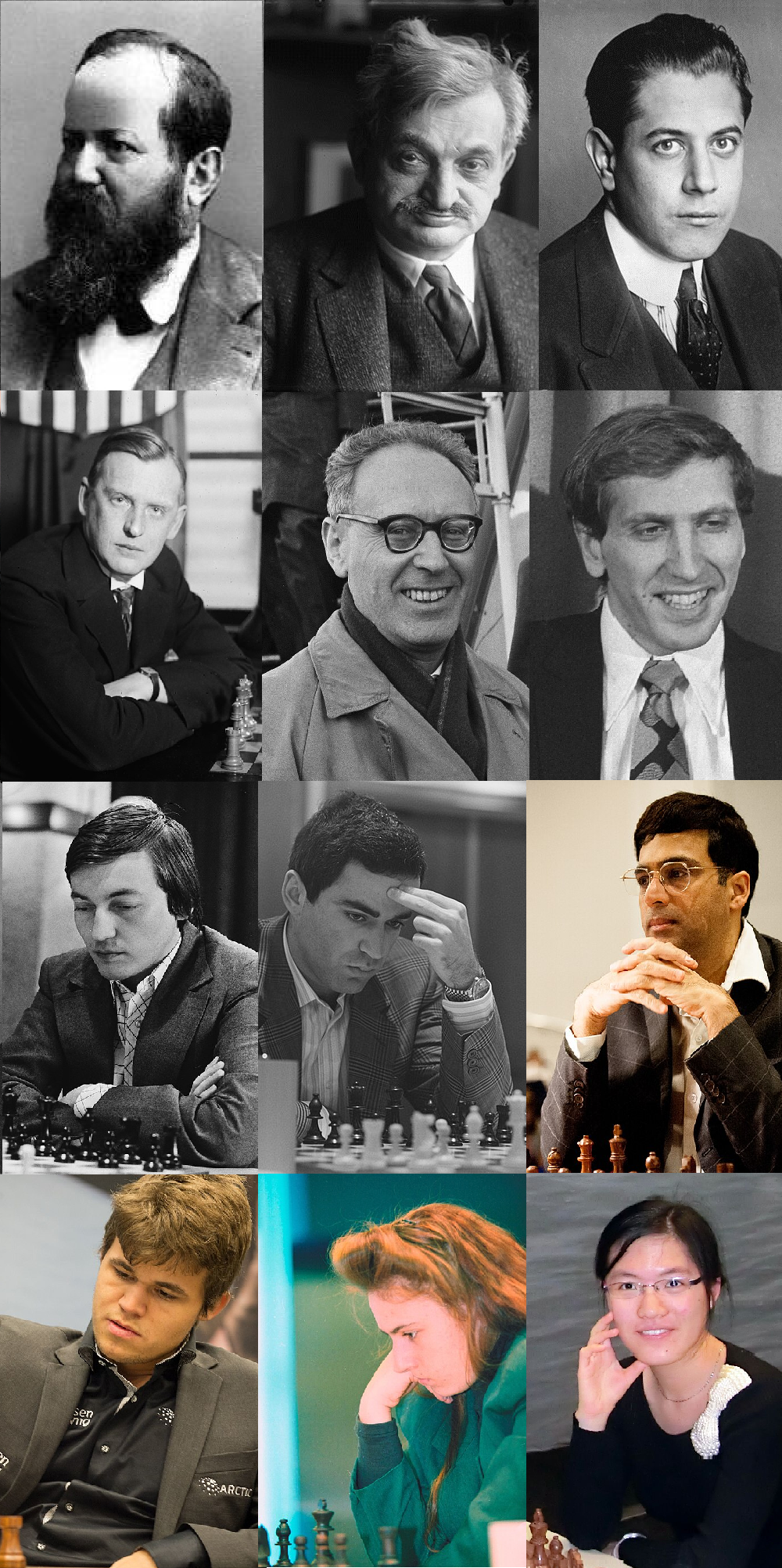
The following world champions are often ranked among the best players in chess history (from left to right and top to bottom) : Wilhelm Steinitz, Emanuel Lasker, José Raúl Capablanca, Alexandre Alekhine, Mikhail Botvinnik, Bobby Fischer, Anatoly Karpov, Garry Kasparov, Viswanathan Anand, Magnus Carlsen, Judit Polgár, Hou Yifan.

Several methods have been suggested for comparing the greatest chess players in history. There is agreement on a statistical system to rate the strengths of current players, called the Elo system, but disagreement about methods used to compare players from different generations who never competed against each other. This is because the Elo system can only compare players success-rate to their contemporaries.

== Statistical methods ==
=== Elo system ===
The most well known statistical method was devised by Arpad Elo in 1960 and elaborated on in his 1978 book The Rating of Chessplayers, Past and Present. He gave ratings to players corresponding to their performance over the best five-year span of their career. According to this system the highest ratings achieved were:

- 2725: José Raúl Capablanca
- 2720: Mikhail Botvinnik, Emanuel Lasker
- 2700: Mikhail Tal
- 2690: Alexander Alekhine, Paul Morphy, Vasily Smyslov

Though published in 1978, Elo's list did not include five-year averages for later players Bobby Fischer and Anatoly Karpov. It did list January 1978 ratings of 2780 for Fischer and 2725 for Karpov.

In 1970, FIDE adopted Elo's system for rating current players, so one way to compare players of different eras is to compare their Elo ratings. The best-ever Elo ratings are tabulated below. As of September 2023, there are 133 chess players in history who broke 2700, and 15 of them exceeded 2800.

Table of top 20 rated players of all time, with date their best ratings were first achieved
Rank	Rating	Player	Date	Age
1	2882	(Norway) Magnus Carlsen	May 2014	23 years, 5 months
2	2851	(Russia) Garry Kasparov	July 1999	36 years, 2 months
3	2844	(United States) / (Italy) Fabiano Caruana	October 2014	22 years, 2 months
4	2830	(United States) / (Armenia) Levon Aronian	March 2014	31 years, 4 months
5	2822	(United States) Wesley So	February 2017	23 years, 3 months
6	2820	(Azerbaijan) Shakhriyar Mamedyarov	September 2018	33 years, 4 months
7	2819	(France) Maxime Vachier-Lagrave	August 2016	25 years, 9 months
8 (tie)	2817	(India) Viswanathan Anand	March 2011	41 years, 2 months
8 (tie)	2817	(Russia) Vladimir Kramnik	October 2016	41 years, 3 months
10 (tie)	2816	(Bulgaria) Veselin Topalov	July 2015	40 years, 3 months
10 (tie)	2816	(United States) Hikaru Nakamura	October 2015	27 years, 9 months
10 (tie)	2816	(China) Ding Liren	November 2018	26 years
13	2810	(Russia) Alexander Grischuk	December 2014	31 years, 1 month
14	2804	(France) Alireza Firouzja	December 2021	18 years, 5 months
15	2801	(India) Arjun Erigaisi	December 2024	21 years, 2 months
16	2798	(Netherlands) Anish Giri	October 2015	21 years, 3 months
17	2795	(Russia) Ian Nepomniachtchi	March 2023	32 years, 7 months
18	2794	(India) Gukesh Dommaraju	October 2024	18 years, 4 months
19	2793	(Azerbaijan) Teimour Radjabov	November 2012	25 years, 7 months
20	2788	(Russia) Alexander Morozevich	July 2008	30 years, 11 months

=== Average rating over time ===
The average Elo rating of top players has fluctuated significantly over time. For instance, the average of the top 10 active players rose from 2751 in July 2000 to 2794 in July 2014, a 43-point increase in 14 years. The average rating of the top 100 players, meanwhile, increased from 2644 to 2703, a 59-point increase. Many people believe that this rise is mostly due to an anomaly known as ratings inflation, making it impractical to compare players of different eras. However an analysis performed by Regan and Haworth suggested that there had been little or no inflation from 1976 to 2009.

Elo said it was futile to attempt to use ratings to compare players from different eras and that they could only measure the strength of a player as compared to their contemporaries. He also stated that the process of rating players was in any case rather approximate — he compared it to "the measurement of the position of a cork bobbing up and down on the surface of agitated water with a yard stick tied to a rope and which is swaying in the wind".

=== Chessmetrics ===
Many statisticians besides Elo have devised similar methods to retrospectively rate players. Jeff Sonas' rating system is called "Chessmetrics". This system takes account of many games played after the publication of Elo's book, and claims to take account of the rating inflation that the Elo system has allegedly suffered from.

One caveat is that a Chessmetrics rating takes into account the frequency of play. According to Sonas, "As soon as you go a month without playing, your Chessmetrics rating will start to drop."

Sonas, like Elo, claims that it is impossible to compare the strength of players from different eras, saying:

Of course, a rating always indicates the level of dominance of a particular player against contemporary peers; it says nothing about whether the player is stronger/weaker in their actual technical chess skill than a player far removed from them in time. So while we cannot say that Bobby Fischer in the early 1970s or José Capablanca in the early 1920s were the "strongest" players of all time, we can say with a certain amount of confidence that they were the two most dominant players of all time. That is the extent of what these ratings can tell us.

Nevertheless, Sonas' website does compare players from different eras. Including data until December 2004, the ratings were:

Rank	1-year peak	5-year peak	10-year peak	15-year peak	20-year peak
1	Bobby Fischer, 2881	Garry Kasparov, 2875	Garry Kasparov, 2863	Garry Kasparov, 2862	Garry Kasparov, 2856
2	Garry Kasparov, 2879	Emanuel Lasker, 2854	Emanuel Lasker, 2847	Anatoly Karpov, 2820	Anatoly Karpov, 2818
3	Mikhail Botvinnik, 2871	José Capablanca, 2843	Anatoly Karpov, 2821	Emanuel Lasker, 2816	Emanuel Lasker, 2809
4	José Capablanca, 2866	Mikhail Botvinnik, 2843	José Capablanca, 2813	José Capablanca, 2798	Alexander Alekhine, 2781
5	Emanuel Lasker, 2863	Bobby Fischer, 2841	Bobby Fischer, 2810	Alexander Alekhine, 2794	Viktor Korchnoi, 2766
6	Alexander Alekhine, 2851	Anatoly Karpov, 2829	Mikhail Botvinnik, 2810	Mikhail Botvinnik, 2789	Vasily Smyslov, 2759

In 2005, Sonas used Chessmetrics to evaluate historical annual performance ratings and came to the conclusion that Kasparov was dominant for the most years, followed by Karpov and Lasker. He also published the following list of the highest ratings ever attained according to calculations done at the start of each month:

Rank	Rating	Player
1	2895	Bobby Fischer
2	2886	Garry Kasparov
3	2885	Mikhail Botvinnik
4	2878	Emanuel Lasker
5	2877	José Capablanca
6	2860	Alexander Alekhine
7	2848	Anatoly Karpov
8	2833	Viswanathan Anand
9	2826	Vladimir Kramnik
10	2826	Wilhelm Steinitz

=== Warriors of the Mind ===
In contrast to Elo and Sonas's systems, Raymond Keene and Nathan Divinsky's book Warriors of the Mind attempts to establish a rating system claiming to compare directly the strength of players active in different eras, and so determine the strongest player of all time (through December 2004). Considering games played between sixty-four of the strongest players in history, they came up with the following top ten:

1. Garry Kasparov, 3096
2. Anatoly Karpov, 2876
3. Bobby Fischer, 2690
4. Mikhail Botvinnik, 2616
5. José Raúl Capablanca, 2552
6. Emanuel Lasker, 2550
7. Viktor Korchnoi, 2535
8. Boris Spassky, 2480
9. Vasily Smyslov, 2413
10. Tigran Petrosian, 2363

These "Divinsky numbers" are not on the same scale as Elo ratings (the last person on the list, Johannes Zukertort, has a Divinsky number of 873, which would be a beginner-level Elo rating). Keene and Divinsky's system has met with limited acceptance, and Warriors of the Mind has been accused of arbitrarily selecting players and bias towards modern players.

== Moves played compared with computer choices ==
The idea of this approach is to compare the moves played by humans to top engine moves, with the rationale that players more likely to choose these moves are also stronger.

=== Early efforts ===
A computer-based process of analyzing chess abilities across history came from Matej Guid and Ivan Bratko at the University of Ljubljana, Slovenia, in 2006. A similar project was conducted for World Champions in 2007–08 using Rybka 2.3.2a (then-strongest chess program) and a modified version of Guid and Bratko's program "Crafty".

=== Computer Aggregated Precision Score (2017) ===
CAPS (Computer Aggregated Precision Score) is a system created by Chess.com that compares players from different eras by finding the percentage of moves that matches that of a chess engine. In this system, Magnus Carlsen scored the highest among world champions, with a CAPS of 98.36, a projected Elo of 2961, a top engine match of 85.26%, from 461 games and 18,850 moves. Other notable champions include Vladimir Kramnik (98.15 CAPS, 2868 projected Elo, 84.51% top engine match, 1,139 games/40,233 moves), Garry Kasparov (98.01 CAPS, 2816 projected Elo, 84.37% top engine match, 956 games/30,752 moves), Bobby Fischer (97.89 CAPS, 2775 projected Elo, 83.50% top engine match, 379 games/13,842 moves).

=== Markovian model (2017) ===
In 2017, Jean-Marc Alliot of the Toulouse Computer Science Research Institute (IRIT) presented a new method, based on a Markovian interpretation of a chess game. Starting with those of Wilhelm Steinitz, all 26,000 games played since then by chess world champions have been processed by a supercomputer using the Stockfish chess engine (rated above 3310 Elo).

These predictions have proven not only to be extremely close to the actual results when players have played concrete games against one another, but to also fare better than those based on Elo scores. The results demonstrate that the level of chess players has been steadily increasing. Magnus Carlsen (in 2013) tops the list, while Vladimir Kramnik (in 1999) is second, Bobby Fischer (in 1971) is third, and Garry Kasparov (in 2001) is fourth.

=== Larry Kaufman (2023) ===
Larry Kaufman published an article in 2023 estimating the ratings of chess players throughout history by comparing their games with the choices of top engines, using Chess.com accuracy scores. He considered only world championship matches and tournaments (official or unofficial, and including women's championships), Candidates and Interzonal events, and non-title matches between the world champion and top contenders. He ignored drawn games, because he believed that previous analyses favoured players who played cautiously, with drawn games generally having fewer inaccuracies than wins.

He estimated ratings for players at their peak years by converting their adjusted “Quality” scores (based on Chess.com engine accuracy in decisive games) to a scale corresponding to Elo ratings in 2023. He estimated ratings for 47 players, with the following top ten:

1. Magnus Carlsen, 2858 (peak years 2013–2021)
2. Garry Kasparov, 2821 (peak years 1993–2001)
3. Bobby Fischer, 2802 (peak years 1970–1972)
4. Ian Nepomniachtchi, 2786 (peak years 2020–2022)
5. Vladimir Kramnik, 2785 (peak years 2000–2007)
6. Viswanathan Anand, 2780 (peak years 2007–2014)
7. Veselin Topalov, 2773 (peak years 2005–2009)
8. Anatoly Karpov, 2746 (peak years 1974–1984)
9. Mikhail Tal, 2711 (peak years 1958–1960)
10. Vasily Smyslov, 2687 (peak years 1953–1957)

(Kaufman noted however that Fabiano Caruana could not be considered by his methodology because his World Championship match had all classical games drawn. He speculated that Caruana "might well be number two of all time".) Kaufman states that "Carlsen is clearly the GOAT in terms of actual quality of play, but of course, that is partly due to the many tools he has available that his predecessors lacked."

Kaufman concluded that the quality of play rose steadily by about 2.5 Elo points per year from 1900 to 2023, though he conceded that the rate was greater in the 19th century and thus that Paul Morphy "might have rivaled Fischer for the top spot if we could properly correct for these factors". He corrected ratings for 2.5 points per year before for 2017 (the midpoint of Carlsen's peak), to estimate players' strength relatively according to their time:

1. Bobby Fischer, 2917
2. Garry Kasparov, 2871
3. José Raúl Capablanca, 2868
4. Alexander Alekhine, 2864
5. Emanuel Lasker, 2862
6. Magnus Carlsen, 2858
7. Mikhail Tal, 2856
8. Harry Nelson Pillsbury, 2853
9. Vasily Smyslov, 2842
10. Reuben Fine, 2842

He made a third list correcting by 2 points per year before 2017, instead of 2.5 points per year. That list again had Fischer first (2894) and Kasparov second (2861); and had Carlsen third on 2858.

== Subjective lists ==
Many prominent players and chess writers have offered their own rankings of players.

=== Bobby Fischer (1964 and 1970) ===
In 1964, Bobby Fischer (World Champion from 1972 to 1975) listed his top 10 in the Chessworld magazine: Morphy, Staunton, Steinitz, Tarrasch, Chigorin, Alekhine, Capablanca, Spassky, Tal, and Reshevsky. He considered Morphy to be "perhaps the most accurate", writing: "In a set match he would beat anyone alive today."

In 1970, Fischer named Morphy, Steinitz, Capablanca, Botvinnik, Petrosian, Tal, Spassky, Reshevsky, Svetozar Gligorić, and Bent Larsen the greatest chess players in history.

=== Irving Chernev (1974) ===
In 1974, popular chess author Irving Chernev published an article titled Who were the greatest? in the English magazine CHESS. He followed this up with his 1976 book The Golden Dozen, in which he ranked his all-time top twelve: 1. Capablanca, 2. Alekhine, 3. Lasker, 4. Fischer, 5. Botvinnik, 6. Petrosian, 7. Tal, 8. Smyslov, 9. Spassky, 10. Bronstein, 11. Rubinstein, and 12. Nimzowitsch.

=== Miguel Quinteros (1992) ===
In a 1992 interview GM Miguel Quinteros gave the opinion: "I think Fischer was and still is the greatest chess player of all time. [...] During his absence other good chess players have appeared. But no one equals Fischer's talent and perfection."

=== Viswanathan Anand (2000, 2008 and 2012) ===
In 2000, when Karpov, Korchnoi and Kasparov were still active, Viswanathan Anand (World Champion from 2007 to 2012) listed his top 10 (in no particular order) as: Fischer, Morphy, Lasker, Capablanca, Steinitz, Tal, Korchnoi, Keres, Karpov and Kasparov.

When interviewed in 2008 shortly after Fischer's death, he ranked Fischer and Kasparov as the greatest, with Kasparov a little ahead by virtue of being on top for so many years.

In 2012, Anand stated that he considered Fischer the best player and also the greatest, because of the hurdles he faced.

=== Chess Informant readers (2001) ===
Svetozar Gligorić reported in his book Shall We Play Fischerandom Chess? (Batsford, 2002):

At the beginning of 2001 a large poll for the "Ten Greatest Chess Players of the 20th Century, selected by Chess Informant readers" resulted in Fischer having the highest percentage of votes and finishing as No. 1, ahead of Kasparov, Alekhine, Capablanca, Botvinnik, Karpov, Tal, Lasker, Anand and Korchnoi.

=== David Edmonds and John Eidinow (2004) ===
BBC award-winning journalists, from their book Bobby Fischer Goes to War: How the Soviets Lost the Most Extraordinary Chess Match of All Time (HarperCollins, 2004):

Fischer, some will maintain, was the outstanding player in chess history, though there are powerful advocates too for Lasker, Capablanca, Alekhine, and Kasparov. Many chess players will dismiss such comparisons as meaningless, akin to the futile attempt to grade the supreme musicians of all time. But the manner in which Fischer stormed his way to Reykjavik, his breathtaking dominance at the Palma de Majorca Interzonal, the trouncings of Taimanov, Larsen, and Petrosian—all this was unprecedented. There never has been an era in modern chess during which one player has so overshadowed all others.

=== Vladimir Kramnik (2005 and 2011) ===
In a 2005 interview, Vladimir Kramnik (World Champion from 2000 to 2007) did not name a greatest player, but stated: "The other world champions had something 'missing'. I can't say the same about Kasparov: he can do everything."

In an interview in 2011, Vladimir Kramnik said about Anand: "I always considered him to be a colossal talent, one of the greatest in the whole history of chess", "I think that in terms of play Anand is in no way weaker than Kasparov", and "In the last 5–6 years he's made a qualitative leap that's made it possible to consider him one of the great chess players".

In December 2023, after Carlsen won his 5th World Rapid Championship and 7th World Blitz Championship, Kramnik announced that he believed Carlsen to be the greatest player of all time.

=== Leonard Barden (2008 and 2025) ===
In his 2008 obituary of Bobby Fischer, Leonard Barden wrote that most experts ranked Kasparov as the best-ever player, with probably Fischer second and Karpov third: "Most experts place him [Fischer] the second or third best ever, behind Kasparov but probably ahead of Karpov. As Kasparov himself wrote in My Great Predecessors, Fischer's superiority over his contemporaries at his peak was greater than any other world champion's."

In 2025, Barden stated that Kasparov remained the greatest player in history owing to his consistently higher-class results over a quarter of a century against the strongest opposition, adding: "I might take a different view if Magnus Carlsen maintains his present level for another five years, although I won't be around to see it. I reluctantly discard Fischer, my personal hero of the three, because his absolute peak was over too brief a period."

=== Levon Aronian (2012, 2015, and 2022) ===
In a 2012 interview, Levon Aronian stated that he considers Alexander Alekhine the best player of all time. During the Sinquefield Cup 2015, Aronian stated that he considers Garry Kasparov the strongest player of all time.

During the FIDE Grand Prix 2022, Aronian stated that "I kind of feel that Magnus will be the greatest for a long long time, because for me he is probably already the greatest but it is still continuing. It will take a long time to beat his achievements."

=== Magnus Carlsen (2012 – 2026) ===
In 2012, Magnus Carlsen said that Kasparov is the greatest player of all time, adding that while Fischer may have been better at his best, Kasparov remained at the top for much longer.

In January 2020, Carlsen said, "Kasparov had 20 years uninterrupted as the world No 1. And I would say for very few of those years was there any doubt that he was the best player. He must be considered as the best in history." He made a similar claim in 2021, saying "Garry Kasparov, in my opinion, the greatest player there's ever been..."

At the centenary celebration of the International Chess Federation in 2024, Carlsen accepted the FIDE award for best player of the past century, but maintained that Kasparov was more deserving.

In August 2026, Carlsen stated in a polygraph interview that he considered himself the greatest chess player of all time. The lie detector suggested that he was telling the truth, and Carlsen confessed that he may have been lying to himself in past interviews.

=== Anatoly Karpov (2021) ===
Anatoly Karpov (World Champion from 1975 to 1985) named Capablanca, Alekhine, Fischer, himself, and Kasparov as his top five in 2021.

=== Hikaru Nakamura (2021 and 2024) ===
In 2021, Hikaru Nakamura published a YouTube video in which he reviewed a chess.com article on "The 10 Best Chess Players Of All Time." In this video, he criticized the exclusion of Anand from the list. He stated that Kasparov and Carlsen should be at number 1 and number 2 respectively due to Kasparov's time as world number one being greater than Carlsen's. At the end of the video, Nakamura listed his top 10 as: Kasparov, Carlsen, Fischer, Capablanca, Karpov, Anand, Kramnik, Botvinnik, Lasker, and Morphy.

During a polygraph interview in 2024, Nakamura answered that he believed Carlsen to be the greatest of all time. The lie detector suggested that he was telling the truth.

=== Hans Niemann (2024) ===
In 2024, on the anniversary of Bobby Fischer's birthday, Hans Niemann called Fischer the greatest player of all time.

=== Fabiano Caruana (2024) ===
During the 45th Chess Olympiad, Caruana said that Carlsen and Kasparov both have a legitimate claim to being called the GOAT, and gave slight preference to Kasparov "in terms of his level of dominance".

=== Wesley So (2026) ===
After beating Carlsen in Norway Chess 2026, American GM Wesley So called Carlsen the greatest player of all time, calling it a "hard choice" between him and Kasparov.

=== R Praggnandhaa (2026) ===
After winning Norway Chess 2026, R Praggnandhaa said that he considers Carlsen the GOAT, saying he has "dominate[d] the chess scene for the last 15 years".

== World Champions by world title reigns ==
The table below organises the world champions in order of championship wins. (For the purpose of this table, a successful defence counts as a win, even if the match was drawn.) The table is made more complicated by the split between the "Classical" and FIDE world titles between 1993 and 2006.

Champion	Total	Undisputed	FIDE	Classical	Years as Undisputed Champion	Years as FIDE/Classical Champion	Total reign
Emanuel Lasker	6	6			27		27
Garry Kasparov	6	4		2	8	7	15
Anatoly Karpov	6	3	3		10	6	16
Mikhail Botvinnik	5	5			13		13
Magnus Carlsen	5	5			9		9
Viswanathan Anand	5	4	1		6	2	8
Alexander Alekhine	4	4			17		17
Wilhelm Steinitz	4	4			8		8
Vladimir Kramnik	3	1		2	1	6	7
Tigran Petrosian	2	2			6		6
José Raúl Capablanca	1	1			6		6
Boris Spassky	1	1			3		3
Bobby Fischer	1	1			3		3
Max Euwe	1	1			2		2
Vasily Smyslov	1	1			1		1
Mikhail Tal	1	1			1		1
Ruslan Ponomariov	1		1			2	2
Alexander Khalifman	1		1			1	1
Rustam Kasimdzhanov	1		1			1	1
Veselin Topalov	1		1			1	1
Ding Liren	1	1			1		1
Gukesh Dommaraju	1	1			1		1

== Female chess players ==
Judit Polgár is widely acknowledged as the greatest and strongest female chess player of all-time, and Hou Yifan is widely acknowledged as the next-strongest. In total, three women have been ranked in the top 100 overall: Judit Polgár with a peak ranking of world No. 8, Maia Chiburdanidze with a peak ranking of world No. 43, and Hou Yifan with a peak ranking of world No. 55. Other women who have been ranked in the top 200 include Susan Polgar, Pia Cramling, Xie Jun, Alisa Galliamova, Humpy Koneru, and Anna Muzychuk. For players who were active before official ratings began, the retrospective rating site Chessmetrics also considered Vera Menchik to have been among the top 100 players in the world for several years, informally estimating her peak ranking at No. 52 in the world.

Judit Polgár is also the only woman who has been rated above 2700 – informally called the "super GM" level – with a peak rating of 2735, a wide margin ahead of anyone else. Hou Yifan has the next-highest peak rating at 2686, also by a wide margin ahead of the next-highest rated player, Humpy Koneru. In total, six women have been rated above 2600, the other three being Aleksandra Goryachkina, Anna Muzychuk, and Ju Wenjun.

== See also ==
- List of FIDE chess world number ones
