= List of FIDE chess world number ones =

A total of seven chess players have been the chess world number one on the official FIDE rating list since it was first published in July 1971.

The first world number one, in July 1971, was Bobby Fischer. In January 1976 Anatoly Karpov became the highest-rated player on the FIDE list, as FIDE had dropped Fischer (whose rating was higher than Karpov's) from the list due to inactivity. In January 1984, Garry Kasparov became the third world number one. He would dominate for 21 years and 3 months from 1984 until his retirement from professional chess on 10 March 2005, with three brief interruptions: Anatoly Karpov briefly held the world number one ranking again in July 1985, as well as during 1994 when FIDE excluded Kasparov from the list; and the fourth world number one, Vladimir Kramnik, briefly held the ranking in January 1996. In January 1990, Kasparov surpassed Fischer's peak of 2785 and became the first player ever to achieve a 2800 rating. In July 1999, he reached his peak rating, 2851. This was the highest FIDE rating in history until January 2013, when it was surpassed by Magnus Carlsen.

On Kasparov's retirement, the world number one ranking passed to Veselin Topalov, since Kasparov was removed from the rating list in April 2006 due to inactivity. In April 2007, Viswanathan Anand became the sixth player to top the rankings. Kramnik briefly returned to the number one ranking in January 2008, but was again joint number one by rating, being placed first in the list due to having played more games in the rating period in question. For most of the period April 2007 to November 2009, the top ranking was held by either Anand or Topalov. The seventh and current world number one is Magnus Carlsen, who first achieved this ranking in the January 2010 list, and has been world number one since July 2011 after having lost and reclaimed the position from Anand during 2010 and 2011.

== Publication details ==
There were unofficial lists in 1964, 1969, 1970 and January 1971, as the Elo rating system was first introduced.

From 1971 to 1980, there was one main rating list published each year (for a total of 10), initially published in July from 1971 to 1973, then once in May (1974), before switching to annual publication in January from 1975 to 1980 (in this period, some supplements and amendments were also published).

From 1981 to July 2000, two lists per year were published, in January and July (for a total of 39 lists). In July 2000, the publication schedule was increased to four times a year (January, April, July, October) operating from July 2000 to July 2009 (for a total of 36 lists). In July 2009, the publication schedule was increased again, to six times a year (January, March, May, July, September, November) operating from July 2009 to July 2012 (for a total of 18 lists). In July 2012 the publication schedule was increased again to the current monthly schedule.

Publication of the rating lists in the 1970s and 1980s was in Chess Informant and other chess publications. The number of games played by individuals during the rating period was added to the lists from July 1985 onwards. Player ID numbers were used from January 1990. From January 1999, the practice of rounding to the nearest five Elo points was discontinued, and ratings were then rounded to the nearest Elo point for publication. From July 2000 onwards, the ratings are available from the FIDE website.

In January 2010 former World Champion Boris Spassky criticized the current emphasis on ratings rather than World Champions. Although Spassky was World Champion during the inception of the FIDE rankings in 1971, he never became the number-one rated player in the world; since July 1971 he, Vladimir Kramnik, Ding Liren, and Gukesh Dommaraju (the current Champion) are the only undisputed World Champions to never become ranked world number one during their tenure as champions as of December 2024. (Kramnik has been ranked number one, but never while he was champion. Spassky and Ding have their peak ranking as World No. 2; Gukesh as World No. 3.)

== List of world number ones ==
=== Top players (list) ===
The following is a list of the players ranked number one on the FIDE rating system from the first official list in July 1971 to the present day, along with their ratings during the periods in question. A rating denoted with bold text followed by an asterisk (*) is a career high rating.

Year	January	February	March	April	May	June	July	August	September	October	November	December
1971	(before official FIDE ratings)						(United States) Fischer (2760)					
1972							(United States) Fischer (2785*)					
1973							(United States) Fischer (2780)					
1974					(United States) Fischer (2780)							
1975	(United States) Fischer (2780)											
1976	(Soviet Union) Karpov (2695)											
1977	(Soviet Union) Karpov (2690)											
1978	(Soviet Union) Karpov (2725)											
1979	(Soviet Union) Karpov (2705)											
1980	(Soviet Union) Karpov (2725)											
1981	(Soviet Union) Karpov (2690)						(2700)					
1982	(Soviet Union) Karpov (2720)						(2700)					
1983	(Soviet Union) Karpov (2710)											
1984	(Soviet Union) Kasparov (2710)						(2715)					
1985	(Soviet Union) Kasparov (2715)						(Soviet Union) Karpov (2720)					
1986	(Soviet Union) Kasparov (2720)						(2740)					
1987	(Soviet Union) Kasparov (2735)						(2740)					
1988	(Soviet Union) Kasparov (2750)						(2760)					
1989	(Soviet Union) Kasparov (2775)											
1990	(Soviet Union) Kasparov (2800)											
1991	(Soviet Union) Kasparov (2800)						(2770)					
1992	(Russia) Kasparov (2780)						(2790)					
1993	(Russia) Kasparov (2805)						(2815)					
1994	(Russia) Karpov (2740)						(Russia) Karpov (2780*)					
1995	(Russia) Kasparov (2805)						(2795)					
1996	(Russia) Kramnik (2775)						(Russia) Kasparov (2785)					
1997	(Russia) Kasparov (2795)						(2820)					
1998	(Russia) Kasparov (2825)						(2815)					
1999	(Russia) Kasparov (2812)						(2851*)					
2000	(Russia) Kasparov (2851*)						(2849)					
2001	(Russia) Kasparov (2849)			(2827)			(2838)					
2002	(Russia) Kasparov (2838)									(2836)		
2003	(Russia) Kasparov (2847)			(2830)								
2004	(Russia) Kasparov (2831)			(2817)						(2813)		
2005	(Russia) Kasparov (2804)			(2812)								
2006	(Russia) Kasparov (2812)			(Bulgaria) Topalov (2804)			(2813)					
2007	(Bulgaria) Topalov (2783)			(India) Anand (2786)			(2792)			(2801)		
2008	(Russia) Kramnik (2799)			(India) Anand (2803)			(2798)			(Bulgaria) Topalov (2791)		
2009	(Bulgaria) Topalov (2796)			(2812)			(2813)				(2810)	
2010	(Norway) Carlsen (2810)		(2813)				(2826)				(India) Anand (2804)	
2011	(Norway) Carlsen (2814)		(India) Anand (2817*)				(Norway) Carlsen (2821)		(2823)		(2826)	
2012	(Norway) Carlsen (2835)						(2837)		(2843)		(2848)	
2013	(Norway) Carlsen (2861)	(2872)			(2868)	(2864)	(2862)			(2870)		(2872)
2014	(Norway) Carlsen (2872)		(2881)		(2882*)	(2881)	(2877)		(2870)	(2863)		(2862)
2015	(Norway) Carlsen (2862)	(2865)	(2863)		(2876)		(2853)			(2850)		(2834)
2016	(Norway) Carlsen (2844)		(2851)			(2855)		(2857)		(2853)		(2840)
2017	(Norway) Carlsen (2840)	(2838)			(2832)		(2822)		(2827)	(2826)	(2837)	
2018	(Norway) Carlsen (2834)	(2843)					(2842)		(2839)		(2835)	
2019	(Norway) Carlsen (2835)	(2845)			(2861)	(2875)	(2872)	(2882*)	(2876)		(2870)	(2872)
2020	(Norway) Carlsen (2872)	(2862)		(2863)							(2862)	
2021	(Norway) Carlsen (2862)		(2847)						(2855)			(2856)
2022	(Norway) Carlsen (2865)		(2864)						(2861)	(2856)	(2859)	
2023	(Norway) Carlsen (2859)	(2852)		(2853)			(2835)		(2839)		(2829)	(2830)
2024	(Norway) Carlsen (2830)						(2832)			(2831)		
2025	(Norway) Carlsen (2831)	(2833)		(2837)			(2839)					(2840)
2026	(Norway) Carlsen (2840)					(2841)	(2823)					
Year	January	February	March	April	May	June	July	August	September	October	November	December

=== Player statistics ===
Seven players have held the world number one ranking over a period of 55 years and 5 months, encompassing 276 rating lists. These seven players include six undisputed world chess champions, with Topalov being the only player to achieve the number one ranking without becoming undisputed world champion, though he was FIDE world champion from 2005 to 2006, and is still an active player. Spassky, Kramnik, Ding, and Gukesh are the only world champions in the period in question to never have been world number one while being champion. (Of these, Kramnik has been world number one, but only when he was not champion; Spassky, Ding, and Gukesh were never world number one.)

Fischer was top of the lists successively five times over a period of 4.5 years, though he is considered to have already become the number one player in the world before the official list started, as he topped the unofficial list in 1970. Karpov topped the list 14 times, successively 11 times over a period of 8 years, once for 6 months, and twice for a year while Kasparov was excluded. Kasparov was world number one on the official list 52 times a period of 21 years and 3 months, and 31 times successively over nearly a decade from July 1996 to January 2006; he was number one 3 times successively over 1.5 years, then 16 times successively over 8 years, then twice successively for one year, and then finally 31 times over 9 years and 9 months. Kramnik was world number one 2 times (for 6 and 3 months), for a total of 9 months. Topalov was world number one successively 4 and 6 times (a total of 10 times), for 12 months and 15 months respectively (for a total of 27 months). Anand was world number one successively 2 and 3 times (a total of 5 times), for 6 months and 9 months respectively (for a total of 15 months). As of August 2026, Carlsen has been world number one 194 times, including a record 182 consecutive times since July 2011.

Time at FIDE number one and youngest age at FIDE number one
Player	Months at No. 1	Peak rating	Age at first time No. 1	Date at first time No. 1	Rating at first time No. 1
(Soviet Union) (Russia) Garry Kasparov	255	2851	20 years, 263 days	January 1, 1984	2710
(Norway) Magnus Carlsen	197	2882	19 years, 32 days	January 1, 2010	2810
(Soviet Union) (Russia) Anatoly Karpov	114	2780	24 years, 223 days	January 1, 1976	2695
(United States) Bobby Fischer	54	2785	28 years, 114 days	July 1, 1971	2760
(Bulgaria) Veselin Topalov	27	2816	31 years, 17 days	April 1, 2006	2804
(India) Viswanathan Anand	24	2817	37 years, 111 days	April 1, 2007	2786
(Russia) Vladimir Kramnik	9	2817	20 years, 190 days	January 1, 1996	2775

== Women ==
=== List of world female number ones ===
The following is a list of the players ranked number one female on the FIDE rating system from the first official list in July 1971 to the present day, along with their ratings during the periods in question. A rating denoted with bold text followed by an asterisk (*) is a career high rating.

Year	January	February	March	April	May	June	July	August	September	October	November	December
1971	(before official FIDE ratings)						(Soviet Union) Nona Gaprindashvili (2390)					
1972							(Soviet Union) Nona Gaprindashvili (2450)					
1973							(Soviet Union) Nona Gaprindashvili (2420)					
1974					(Soviet Union) Nona Gaprindashvili (2405)							
1975	(Soviet Union) Nona Gaprindashvili (2410)											
1976	(Soviet Union) Nona Gaprindashvili (2440)											
1977	(Soviet Union) Nona Gaprindashvili (2445)											
1978	(Soviet Union) Nona Gaprindashvili (2425)											
1979	(Soviet Union) Nona Gaprindashvili (2405)											
1980	(Soviet Union) Maia Chiburdanidze (2400)											
1981	(Soviet Union) Maia Chiburdanidze (2425)						(2405)					
1982	(Soviet Union) Maia Chiburdanidze (2390)						(2385)					
1983	(Sweden) Pia Cramling (2355)						(Soviet Union) Maia Chiburdanidze (2380)					
1984	(Sweden) Pia Cramling (2405)						(Hungary) Susan Polgar (2405)					
1985	(Hungary) Susan Polgar (2430)						(Soviet Union) Maia Chiburdanidze (2450)					
1986	(Soviet Union) Maia Chiburdanidze (2455)						(Hungary) Susan Polgar (2455)					
1987	(Soviet Union) Maia Chiburdanidze (2530)						(2550)					
1988	(Soviet Union) Maia Chiburdanidze (2560*)						(2555)					
1989	(Hungary) Judit Polgár (2555)											
1990	(Hungary) Judit Polgár (2550)						(2540)					
1991	(Hungary) Judit Polgár (2540)						(2550)					
1992	(Hungary) Judit Polgár (2550)						(2575)					
1993	(Hungary) Judit Polgár (2595)						(2635)					
1994	(Hungary) Judit Polgár (2630)											
1995	(Hungary) Judit Polgár (2630)						(2635)					
1996	(Hungary) Judit Polgár (2675)						(2665)					
1997	(Hungary) Judit Polgár (2645)						(2670)					
1998	(Hungary) Judit Polgár (2675)						(2665)					
1999	(Hungary) Judit Polgár (2677)						(2671)					
2000	(Hungary) Judit Polgár (2658)						(2656)					
2001	(Hungary) Judit Polgár (2676)			(2678)			(2686)					
2002	(Hungary) Judit Polgár (2677)						(2681)			(2685)		
2003	(Hungary) Judit Polgár (2700)			(2715)			(2718)			(2722)		
2004	(Hungary) Judit Polgár (2728)											
2005	(United States) Susan Polgar (2577*)			(Hungary) Judit Polgár (2732)			(Hungary) Judit Polgár (2735*)					
2006	(Hungary) Judit Polgár (2711)						(2710)					
2007	(Hungary) Judit Polgár (2727)						(2707)			(2708)		
2008	(Hungary) Judit Polgár (2707)			(2709)			(2711)					
2009	(Hungary) Judit Polgár (2693)						(2687)				(2680)	
2010	(Hungary) Judit Polgár (2682)										(2686)	
2011	(Hungary) Judit Polgár (2686)				(2699)				(2701)		(2710)	
2012	(Hungary) Judit Polgár (2710)		(2709)					(2698)		(2705)		
2013	(Hungary) Judit Polgár (2696)									(2689)		(2693)
2014	(Hungary) Judit Polgár (2693)			(2685)			(2676)		(2675)			
2015	(Hungary) Judit Polgár (2675)		(China) Hou Yifan (2686*)			(2676)		(Hungary) Judit; Polgar (2675)	(China) Hou Yifan (2671)		(2683)	
2016	(China) Hou Yifan (2673)		(2667)	(2663)				(2658)		(2649)	(2635)	(2651)
2017	(China) Hou Yifan (2651)		(2649)		(2652)	(2666)		(2652)	(2670)	(2678)	(2680)	
2018	(China) Hou Yifan (2680)	(2654)		(2657)	(2658)							(2662)
2019	(China) Hou Yifan (2662)					(2659)						(2664)
2020	(China) Hou Yifan (2664)		(2658)									
2021	(China) Hou Yifan (2658)											
2022	(China) Hou Yifan (2658)		(2650)							(2638)		
2023	(China) Hou Yifan (2638)		(2628)								(2632)	
2024	(China) Hou Yifan (2632)							(2633)				
2025	(China) Hou Yifan (2633)							(2609)		(2617)	(2620)	(2613)
2026	(China) Hou Yifan (2613)	(2596)										
Year	January	February	March	April	May	June	July	August	September	October	November	December

=== Women statistics ===
Time at FIDE number one and youngest age at FIDE number one
Player	Months at No. 1	Peak rating	Age at first time No. 1	Date at first time No. 1	Rating at first time No. 1
(Hungary) Judit Polgár	312	2735	12 years, 162 days	January 1, 1989	2555
(China) Hou Yifan	140	2686	21 years, 2 days	March 1, 2015	2686
(Soviet Union) Nona Gaprindashvili	102	2495	30 years, 59 days	July 1, 1971	2390
(Soviet Union) Maia Chiburdanidze	78	2560	18 years, 349 days	January 1, 1980	2400
(Hungary) (United States) Susan Polgar	21	2577	15 years, 73 days	July 1, 1984	2405
(Sweden) Pia Cramling	12	2550	19 years, 253 days	January 1, 1983	2355

== List of junior world number ones ==
FIDE publishes lists of highest-rated junior chess players; a "junior" is defined as being a player who is aged under 20 at the start of the year. The following is a list of the players ranked number one junior in the FIDE rating system from July 1999 to the present day, along with their ratings during the periods in question.

Year	January	February	March	April	May	June	July	August	September	October	November	December
1999	N/A						(Hungary) Peter Leko (2701)					
2000	(Ukraine) Ruslan Ponomariov (2627)						(2630)			(2624)		
2001	(Ukraine) Ruslan Ponomariov (2677)			(2673)			(2684)					
2002	(Ukraine) Ruslan Ponomariov (2727)			(2743)								
2003	(Ukraine) Ruslan Ponomariov (2734)			(2718)			(Russia) Alexander Grischuk (2732)					
2004	(Azerbaijan) Teimour Radjabov (2656)			(2670)			(2664)			(2663)		
2005	(Ukraine) Andrei Volokitin (2685)			(2679)			(Azerbaijan) Teimour Radjabov (2682)			(2704)		
2006	(Azerbaijan) Teimour Radjabov (2700)			(2717)			(2728)			(2729)		
2007	(Azerbaijan) Teimour Radjabov (2729)			(2747)			(2746)			(2742)		
2008	(Norway) Magnus Carlsen (2733)			(2765)			(2775)			(2786)		
2009	(Norway) Magnus Carlsen (2776)			(2770)			(2772)				(2801)	
2010	(Norway) Magnus Carlsen (2810)		(2813)				(2826)				(2802)	
2011	(Italy) Fabiano Caruana (2721)		(2716)		(2714)		(Vietnam) Lê Quang Liêm (2711)		(Netherlands) Anish Giri (2722)		(Italy) Fabiano Caruana (2727)	
2012	(Italy) Fabiano Caruana (2736)		(2767)		(2770)		(2775)	(2773)		(2772)	(2786)	(2782)
2013	(Netherlands) Anish Giri (2726)	(2722)	(2729)	(2727)	(2734)			(2737)		(2749)	(2732)	(2734)
2014	(Netherlands) Anish Giri (2734)	(2746)	(2745)		(2746)	(2752)	(2750)	(2745)	(2758)	(2768)	(2776)	(2768)
2015	(Hungary) Richárd Rapport (2716)	(2703)	(2709)	(2710)	(China) Wei Yi		(2724)	(2725)	(2734)		(2737)	(2730)
2015	(Hungary) Richárd Rapport (2716)	(2703)	(2709)	(2710)	(2718)	(2721)	(2724)	(2725)	(2734)		(2737)	(2730)
2016	(Hungary) Richárd Rapport (2721)		(2720)	(2717)	(2731)		(2752)			(2729)	(2730)	(2717)
2017	(China) Wei Yi (2706)	(2725)		(2727)	(2732)	(2728)	(2738)	(2753)	(2748)	(2740)	(2739)	(2743)
2018	(China) Wei Yi (2743)	(2734)					(Poland) Jan-Krzysztof Duda		(China) Wei Yi (2742)		(Poland) Jan-Krzysztof Duda	
2018	(China) Wei Yi (2743)	(2734)					(2737)	(2740)	(China) Wei Yi (2742)		(2738)	
2019	(China) Wei Yi (2733)			(2728)	(2736)	(2741)	(2737)	(2727)	(2721)		(2724)	(2725)
2020	Alireza Firouzja (FIDE)		(2728)								(2749)	
2020	(2723)	(2726)	(2728)								(2749)	
2021	Alireza Firouzja (FIDE) (2749)		(2759)				(France) Alireza Firouzja (2759)		(2754)	(2770)		(2804)
2022	(France) Alireza Firouzja (2804)					(2793)		(2778)		(2785)		
2023	(France) Alireza Firouzja (2785)					(2786)	(2777)					(2763)
2024	(Germany) Vincent Keymer (2743)	(India) R Praggnanandhaa (2747)	(Uzbekistan) N. Abdusattorov (2750)	(2765)		(2766)	(2769)	(India) Gukesh D (2766)	(Uzbekistan) N. Abdusattorov (2766)	(India) Gukesh D (2794)	(2783)	
2025	(India) Gukesh D (2783)	(2777)	(2787)			(2776)	(India) R Praggnanandhaa (2779)		(2785)	(2771)	(2768)	(2761)
2026	(India) Gukesh D (2754)		(2748)	(2732)			(2717)	(Turkey) Yağız Kaan Erdoğmuş (2716)		(2731)	(2719)	
Year	January	February	March	April	May	June	July	August	September	October	November	December

== List of girl world number ones ==
FIDE publishes lists of highest-rated girl chess players; a "girl" is defined as being a player who is aged under 20 at the start of the year, and female. The following is a list of the players ranked number one girl in the FIDE rating system from January 2000 to the present day, along with their ratings during the periods in question.

Year	January	February	March	April	May	June	July	August	September	October	November	December
2000	(Vietnam) Hoang Thanh Trang (2448)						(2489)			(2493)		
2001	(China) Xu Yuanyuan (2437)			(Lithuania) Viktorija Čmilytė (2464)			(2464)			(India) Humpy Koneru (2484)		
2002	(India) Humpy Koneru (2539)			(2486)			(2473)			(2484)		
2003	(India) Humpy Koneru (2496)			(2496)			(2468)			(Ukraine) Kateryna Lagno (2486) (Note: FIDE erroneously states that Anna Muzychuk (rated 2325) was the highest-rated girl player in October 2003, despite their official list showing sixteen girl players more highly-rated than Muzychuk.)		
2004	(India) Humpy Koneru (2498)			(2513)			(Russia) Alexandra Kosteniuk (2511)			(2508)		
2005	(India) Humpy Koneru (2512)			(2508)			(2531)			(2540)		
2006	(India) Humpy Koneru (2537)			(2548)			(2545)			(2545)		
2007	(India) Humpy Koneru (2567)			(2575)			(2572)			(2606)		
2008	(China) Hou Yifan (2527)			(2549)			(2557)			(2578)		
2009	(China) Hou Yifan (2571)			(2590)			(2584)		(2585)		(2588)	
2010	(China) Hou Yifan (2590)		(2570)		(2589)		(2577)		(2578)		(2591)	
2011	(China) Hou Yifan (2602)				(2612)		(2575)		(2578)			
2012	(China) Hou Yifan (2605)		(2639)		(2623)		(2617)	(2599)		(2605)	(2606)	
2013	(China) Hou Yifan (2603)	(2617)				(2595)	(2600)	(2609)		(2621)	(2629)	
2014	(China) Hou Yifan (2629)			(2618)	(2629)			(2661)	(2663)	(2673)		
2015	(Russia) Aleksandra Goryachkina											
2015	(2451)		(2456)	(2473)	(2474)	(2486)		(2474)	(2497)	(2480)	(2478)	(2493)
2016	(Russia) Aleksandra Goryachkina			(China) Lei Tingjie			(Russia) Aleksandra; Goryachkina (2482)	(China) Lei Tingjie				
2016	(2502)		(2509)	(2504)	(2487) (Note: FIDE did not release an official list of top girl players in May 2016, perhaps as a reference to the HTTP 404 computer error: such a list, if published, would have been numbered 404 on the FIDE website.)		(Russia) Aleksandra; Goryachkina (2482)	(2480)		(2473)		(2468)
2017	(China) Lei Tingjie (2467)		(2480)		(2471)	(2482)	(2488)	(2522)	(2514)	(2534)	(2528)	
2018	(Russia) Aleksandra Goryachkina											
2018	(2493)		(2491)	(2495)	(2496)	(2505)	(2509)	(2535)		(2536)	(2534)	(2518)
2019	(Kazakhstan) Zhansaya Abdumalik (2468)		(Russia) Polina; Shuvalova (2471)	(Kazakhstan) Zhansaya Abdumalik					(China) Zhu Jiner		(Kazakhstan) Zhansaya Abdumalik	
2019	(Kazakhstan) Zhansaya Abdumalik (2468)		(Russia) Polina; Shuvalova (2471)	(2463)	(2464)		(2458)	(2457)	(2471)	(2507)	(2472)	(2465)
2020	(Kazakhstan) Zhansaya Abdumalik (2471)		(2461)	(2478)								
2021	(Russia) Polina Shuvalova (2476)				(2484)	(2489)		(2507)	(2510)	(2509)	(2515)	(2516)
2022	(China) Zhu Jiner (2478)		(2464)							(2484)	(2486)	
2023	(Kazakhstan) Bibisara Assaubayeva (2440)				(2464)	(2469)					(2468)	(2472)
2024	(Kazakhstan) Bibisara Assaubayeva (2472)			(2481)		(2472)		(India) Divya Deshmukh (2472)	(2483)	(2501)	(2493)	(Kazakhstan) Bibisara; Assaubayeva (2492)
2025	(India) Divya Deshmukh (2490)		(2470)	(2460)	(2469)	(2463)		(2478)		(2498)	(2505)	(2497)
2026	(China) Lu Miaoyi (2431)	(2438)	Anna Shukhman (2431)	(Kazakhstan) Alua Nurman (2443)	Anna Shukhman (2456)		(Ukraine) Anastasiia Hnatyshyn (2465)		(2463)	(United States) Alice Lee (2467)	(2474)	
Year	January	February	March	April	May	June	July	August	September	October	November	December

== Rapid and blitz ratings ==
Since January 2012, FIDE has also calculated ratings for Rapid and Blitz chess, and has published top player rating lists for these time controls since May 2014.

=== Rapid chess ===
==== Top players ====
Year	January	February	March	April	May	June	July	August	September	October	November	December
2014	N/A				(United States) Hikaru Nakamura (2841)		(Italy) Fabiano Caruana (2858)					
2015	(Italy) Fabiano Caruana (2856)		(Norway) Carlsen (2855)	(United States) Hikaru Nakamura (2850)							(Norway) Magnus Carlsen (2873)	
2016	(Norway) Magnus Carlsen (2878)						(2894)					(2906)
2017	(Norway) Magnus Carlsen (2896)						(2919)	(2909)				(2908)
2018	(Norway) Magnus Carlsen (2880)											(2903)
2019	(Norway) Magnus Carlsen (2869)					(2895)			(France) Maxime Vachier-Lagrave			(Norway) Carlsen
2019	(Norway) Magnus Carlsen (2869)					(2895)			(2867)		(2873)	(2886)
2020	(Norway) Magnus Carlsen (2881)											
2021	(Norway) Magnus Carlsen (2881)								(Norway) Magnus Carlsen (2842)			
2022	(Norway) Magnus Carlsen (2847)							(United States) Hikaru Nakamura (2837)	(Norway) Magnus Carlsen (2834)			
2023	(Norway) Magnus Carlsen (2839)					(China) Ding Liren (2830)						
2024	(China) Ding Liren (2830)	(Norway) Magnus Carlsen (2823)				(2827)				(2834)	(2825)	(2838)
2025	(Norway) Magnus Carlsen (2819)							(2808)			(2824)	
2026	(Norway) Magnus Carlsen (2832)						(2803)			(2801)		

==== Top women ====
Year	January	February	March	April	May	June	July	August	September	October	November	December
2014	N/A				(Hungary) Judit Polgár (2656)		(2646)					
2015	(Hungary) Judit Polgár (2646)						(China) Hou Yifan (2614)				(2625)	
2016	(China) Hou Yifan (2625)			(2631)						(2645)		
2017	(Ukraine) Anna Muzychuk (2611)		(China) Hou Yifan (2611)					(2617)		(2618)		
2018	(China) Hou Yifan (2618)		(Ukraine) Anna Muzychuk (2611)		(2597)			(2609)				
2019	(China) Ju Wenjun (2618)		(2613)									
2020	(China) Hou Yifan (2621)											
2021	(China) Hou Yifan (2621)											
2022	(China) Ju Wenjun (2610)	(Russia) Alexandra Kosteniuk (2542)		Alexandra Kosteniuk (FIDE) (2542)					(China) Ju Wenjun (2600)	(China) Hou Yifan (2618)		
2023	(China) Hou Yifan (2618)				(China) Ju Wenjun (2592)				(2581)	(2575)		
2024	(China) Ju Wenjun (2566)					(2550)		(China) Hou Yifan (2550)	(China) Ju Wenjun (2536)		(China) Hou Yifan (2539)	
2025	(China) Ju Wenjun (2542)							(China) Hou Yifan (2536)				
2026	(China) Hou Yifan (2529)											

==== Top juniors ====
Year	January	February	March	April	May	June	July	August	September	October	November	December
2014	N/A				(Hungary) Richárd Rapport (2707)		(2717)	(2724)				
2015	(Hungary) Richárd Rapport (2724)			(2736)								
2016	(Hungary) Richárd Rapport (2729)											
2017	(Russia) Vladislav Artemiev (2706)					(2719)			(2708)	(2712)	(2687)	
2018	(Russia) Vladislav Artemiev (2767)					(2733)				(2764)	(2812)	
2019	(China) Wei Yi (2698)					(2713)					(United States) Jeffery Xiong (2730)	
2020	(United States) Jeffery Xiong (2730)											
2021	Alireza Firouzja (FIDE) (2703)						(France) Alireza Firouzja (2696)		(Russia) Andrey Esipenko (2681)		(2679)	
2022	(Russia) Andrey Esipenko (2679)			Andrey Esipenko (FIDE)				(France) Alireza Firouzja				
2022	(Russia) Andrey Esipenko (2679)			Andrey Esipenko (FIDE)				(2704)	(2732)	(2745)		
2023	(France) Alireza Firouzja (2745)							(2742)				(2737)
2024	(Uzbekistan) Nodirbek Abdusattorov (2733)					(2724)		(2732)	(2723)	(2722)	(2742)	(2740)
2025	(India) Praggnanandhaa R (2684)				(2688)		(Uzbekistan) Javokhir Sindarov (2688)	(India) Praggnanandhaa R (2691)	(India) Gukesh D (2693)		(2692)	(Uzbekistan) Javokhir Sindarov (2704)
2026	(India) Gukesh D (2692)				(2682)	(2684)		(2686)				

==== Top girls ====
Year	January	February	March	April	May	June	July	August	September	October	November	December
2014	N/A				(China) Hou Yifan (2600)							
2015	(China) Guo Qi (2426)				(Russia) Aleksandra Goryachkina							
2015	(China) Guo Qi (2426)				(2429)	(2453)						
2016	(China) Lei Tingjie (2445)					(2446)					(Russia) Aleksandra Goryachkina	
2016	(China) Lei Tingjie (2445)					(2446)					(2456)	(2466)
2017	(Russia) Aleksandra Goryachkina (2462)										(2487)	(2460)
2018	(Russia) Aleksandra Goryachkina (2476)				(2477)							
2019	(Kazakhstan) Zhansaya Abdumalik (2490)					(2484)						
2020	(Kazakhstan) Zhansaya Abdumalik (2462)											
2021	(Russia) Polina Shuvalova (2394)								(United States) Carissa Yip (2393)		(Russia) Polina Shuvalova (2400)	
2022	(Kazakhstan) Bibisara Assaubayeva (2396)											
2023	(United States) Carissa Yip (2393)	(Kazakhstan) Bibisara Assaubayeva (2359)			(2432)				(2439)		(2436)	
2024	(Kazakhstan) Bibisara Assaubayeva (2425)							(2434)	(2439)		(2444)	
2025	(United States) Alice Lee (2412)							(India) Divya Deshmukh (2419)				
2026	(Uzbekistan) Afruza Khamdamova (2367)			(United States) Alice Lee (2415)				(2410)				

=== Blitz chess ===
==== Top players (blitz) ====
Year	January	February	March	April	May	June	July	August	September	October	November	December
2014	N/A				(United States) Hikaru Nakamura (2879)		(Norway) Magnus Carlsen (2948)					
2015	(Norway) Magnus Carlsen (2948)			(2933)			(2914)				(United States) Hikaru Nakamura (2884)	
2016	(Norway) Magnus Carlsen (2890)				(2915)		(China) Ding Liren (2875)					
2017	(Norway) Magnus Carlsen 2914)						(2899)	(2948)				(2986)
2018	(Norway) Magnus Carlsen (2965)					(2939)						
2019	(Norway) Magnus Carlsen (2954)					(2923)	(France) Maxime Vachier-Lagrave		(United States) Hikaru Nakamura			
2019	(Norway) Magnus Carlsen (2954)					(2923)	(2948)	(2939)	(2871)			(2885)
2020	(United States) Hikaru Nakamura (2900)											
2021	(United States) Hikaru Nakamura (2900)								(Norway) Magnus Carlsen (2892)			
2022	(United States) Hikaru Nakamura (2850)					(United States) Levon Aronian (2850)				(United States) Hikaru Nakamura (2909)		
2023	(France) Alireza Firouzja (2904)					(2896)						(Norway) Magnus Carlsen (2887)
2024	(Norway) Magnus Carlsen (2886)					(2888)					(2893)	(2890)
2025	(Norway) Magnus Carlsen (2889)	(2883)						(2881)				
2026	(Norway) Magnus Carlsen (2869)						(2860)					

==== Top women (blitz) ====
Year	January	February	March	April	May	June	July	August	September	October	November	December
2014	N/A				(Hungary) Judit Polgár (2673)		(Hungary) Judit Polgár (2736)					
2015	(Hungary) Judit Polgár (2736)						(China) Hou Yifan (2704)					
2016	(Russia) Valentina Gunina (2598)		(Russia) Kateryna Lagno				(China) Hou Yifan (2676)					
2016	(Russia) Valentina Gunina (2598)		(2594)	(2641)			(China) Hou Yifan (2676)					
2017	(Ukraine) Anna Muzychuk (2663)										(China) Hou Yifan (2659)	
2018	(Georgia (country)) Nana Dzagnidze (2580)							(China) Hou Yifan (2627)				
2019	(China) Hou Yifan (2627)							(Russia) Kateryna Lagno (2587)			(2606)	
2020	(Russia) Kateryna Lagno (2608)											
2021	(Russia) Kateryna Lagno (2608)								(China) Hou Yifan (2601)			
2022	(Russia) Kateryna Lagno (2522)											
2023	(China) Tan Zhongyi (2519)				(China) Hou Yifan (2561)							
2024	(China) Hou Yifan (2561)				(China) Ju Wenjun (2500)		(Russia) Kateryna Lagno (2500)	(China) Hou Yifan (2529)	(2522)			
2025	(China) Hou Yifan (2522)						(2500)	(2519)				(2521)
2026	(China) Hou Yifan (2521)											

==== Top juniors (blitz) ====
Year	January	February	March	April	May	June	July	August	September	October	November	December
2014	N/A				(China) Yu Yangyi (2771)		(Netherlands) Anish Giri (2757)					
2015	(Ukraine) Olexandr Bortnyk				(Russia) Vladimir Fedoseev (2798)			(China) Lu Shanglei (2780)				
2015	(2761)	(2762)	(2764)		(Russia) Vladimir Fedoseev (2798)			(China) Lu Shanglei (2780)				
2016	(Russia) Daniil Dubov (2713)		(Russia) Vladislav Artemiev (2724)	(Ukraine) Olexandr Bortnyk (2769)			(2784)			(Russia) Vladislav Artemiev		
2016	(Russia) Daniil Dubov (2713)		(Russia) Vladislav Artemiev (2724)	(Ukraine) Olexandr Bortnyk (2769)			(2784)			(2781)	(2847)	
2017	(Russia) Vladislav Artemiev (2777)		(2785)	(2746)					(China) Wei Yi (2740)	(Russia) Vladislav Artemiev		
2017	(Russia) Vladislav Artemiev (2777)		(2785)	(2746)					(China) Wei Yi (2740)	(2729)	(2798)	
2018	(Russia) Vladislav Artemiev (2834)			(2824)	(2849)						(2825)	
2019	(Iran) Alireza Firouzja (2724)			(Iran) Parham Maghsoodloo (2719)				(2729)	(2735)			
2020	Alireza Firouzja (FIDE) (2750)				(2770)							
2021	Alireza Firouzja (FIDE) (2770)						(France) Alireza Firouzja (2810)					
2022	(France) Alireza Firouzja (2791)							(2795)		(2904)		
2023	(France) Alireza Firouzja (2904)					(2896)						(2863)
2024	(India) Nihal Sarin (2704)								(2711)	(Uzbekistan) Nodirbek Abdusattorov (2715)		(India) Praggnanandhaa R (2716)
2025	(India) Praggnanandhaa R (2717)					(2734)		(2705)	(2707)		(2699)	(2703)
2026	(FIDE) Volodar Murzin (2652)	(India) Gukesh D (2646)			(FIDE) Volodar Murzin (2662)		(2670)					

==== Top girls (blitz) ====
Year	January	February	March	April	May	June	July	August	September	October	November	December
2014	N/A				(China) Hou Yifan (2662)							
2015	(China) Guo Qi (2396)						(Russia) Aleksandra Goryachkina		(China) Wang Jue (2505)			
2015	(China) Guo Qi (2396)						(2363)	(2377)	(China) Wang Jue (2505)			
2016	(China) Zhai Mo (2398)			(China) Lei Tingjie								
2016	(China) Zhai Mo (2398)			(2415)	(2434)					(2446)		
2017	(China) Lei Tingjie (2446)					(2451)				(2461)		
2018	(Kazakhstan) Zhansaya Abdumalik (2457)			(Russia) Aleksandra Goryachkina								
2018	(Kazakhstan) Zhansaya Abdumalik (2457)			(2449)	(2448)	(2422)						
2019	(Kazakhstan) Zhansaya Abdumalik (2368)					(2415)						
2020	(Kazakhstan) Zhansaya Abdumalik (2409)									(Russia) Aleksandra Maltsevskaya (2411)	(Kazakhstan) Zhansaya Abdumalik (2409)	
2021	(India) Vaishali Rameshbabu (2313)									(Russia) Polina Shuvalova (2341)		(India) R Vaishali (2313)
2022	(Kazakhstan) Bibisara Assaubayeva (2404)											
2023	(Kazakhstan) Bibisara Assaubayeva (2440)				(2461)	(2478)				(2476)		
2024	(Kazakhstan) Bibisara Assaubayeva (2469)							(2457)	(2443)			
2025	(India) Divya Deshmukh (2343)	(Netherlands) Eline Roebers (2360)		(2349)	(China) Song Yuxin (2361)	(2373)	(India) Divya Deshmukh (2388)					
2026	(Netherlands) Eline Roebers (2413)	(2414)	(2425)					(2431)	(2428)			

== See also ==
- Comparison of top chess players throughout history
- Chess rating systems
- List of chess players by peak FIDE rating
