= Pepe Cuenca =

Spanish chess grandmaster (born 1987)

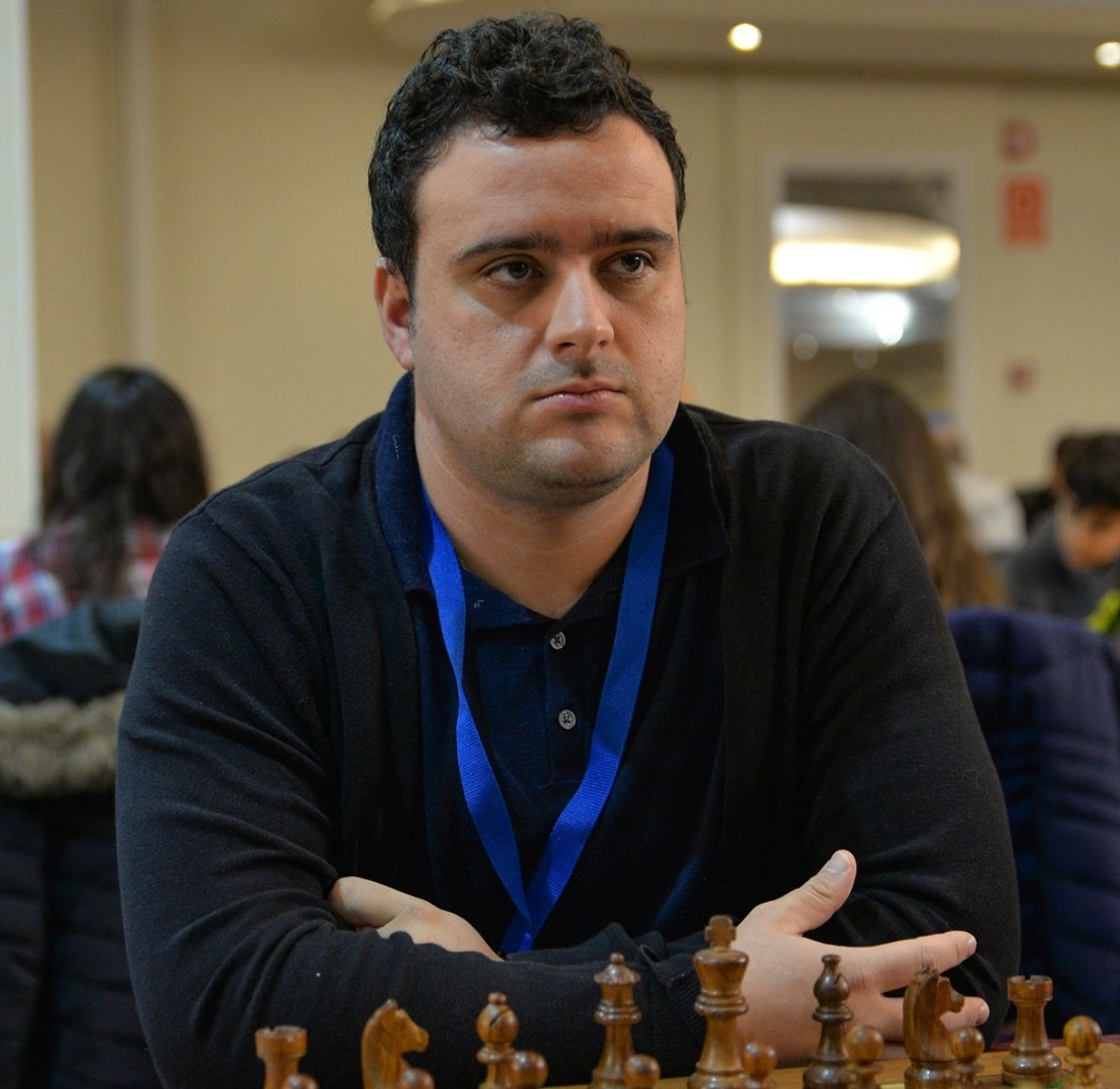
- Pepe Cuenca in the Spanish Senior Chess Championship 2019
- Born: 17 March 1987 (age 39); Granada, Spain
- Education: University of Granada; University of Hamburg
- Occupations: Civil engineer, doctor of applied mathematics
- Chess career
- Country: Spain
- Title: Grandmaster (2015)
- FIDE rating: 2471 (October 2026)
- Peak rating: 2558 (March 2022)

YouTube information
- Channel: @ajedrezconpepecuenca
- Years active: 2022–present
- Genre: Online chess
- Subscribers: 95.3 thousand
- Views: 13 million

José Fernando Cuenca Jiménez, better known as Pepe Cuenca (born March 17, 1987, in Granada), is a Spanish chess grandmaster and commentator.

At the age of 19 he got his International Master title from FIDE at the Motril International Open in December 2006 and in 2015 he got his International Grandmaster title, currently the highest title of chess master that can be achieved. In March 2022 he had his highest Elo rating system: 2558 points.

He started as a chess commentator on the chess24.com platform, with his partner, David Martínez (Divis), broadcasting to the Spanish speaking community. He is also a chess commentator on YouTube.

== Biography ==
He won several Spanish junior championships in youth chess tournaments, including the under-16 title in 2003 and the under-18 title in 2005, both in Mondariz.

He competed in four World Age Group Chess Championship events, where he placed between 30th and 40th. His international appearances include the U-12 event at Oropesa in 1999, the U-14 event at Oropesa in 2001, the U-16 event at Halkidiki in 2003, and the U-18 event at Belfort in 2005.

Regionally, he won the Andalusian championship in 2005. In earlier age categories, he was the Andalusian champion in the U-12 category in 1999; in the U-14 category in 2000 and 2001; in the U-16 category in 2002 and 2003; and in the U-18 category in 2000 and 2005. He also won the U-16 Andalusia Cup in 2000.

Representing the Andalusian Chess Federation, he won the Spanish Autonomic Selections championship in 2001 and was runner-up in the Andalusian Team Chess Division of Honour in 2005 with the Caja Granada Chess Club. During his tenure with the federation, he also met chess commentators Carlos Matamoros Franco and Luis Fernández Siles.

At 19, he earned his FIDE International Master title, and in 2015 he achieved the International Grandmaster title by completing his final norm in the German Bundesliga. By March 2022, his Elo rating had peaked at 2558.

In national competition, he was runner-up at the 2018 Spanish Chess Championship in Linares (Jaén) and finished eighth in the 2019 absolute championship, with both finals featuring decisive last-round results.

In 2024, he placed among the top competitors in the Honor Division of the Spanish Club Chess Championship, particularly during the final rounds.

As a trainer, Cuenca holds the title of FIDE Trainer.

He won the La Roda International Open in 2011 and has competed in various European leagues, including those in Spain, Germany, France, Italy, England, Sweden, Denmark, and Portugal.

In September 2020 he was proclaimed champion of Spain by teams of Division of Honour with Club de Ajedrez Silla - Bosch Serinsys, a club that belongs to the Chess Federation of the Valencian Community, in Linares (Jaén).

== Academic career ==
Cuenca is a civil engineering graduate from the University of Granada (2005–2010). His final degree project was a research project, and he developed a new type of more effective and cheaper concrete from ash from the combustion of olive biomass. This work was published in the journal Construction and Building Materials in 2013 and has reached 144 citations in 2024 according to ResearchGate. This study can have a positive impact in the local-sustainable economy as olive-biomass is a main product of the region but further research is going on to ensure the high quality of this manufacture of concrete.

After finishing his degree, Cuenca obtained several scholarships to study for a master's degree, some of them as a chess sportsman in the United States. He finally decided to accept an Erasmus Mundus Scholarship to study the MSc Mathmods: Mathematical Modelling in Engineering: Theory, Numeric, Applications from 2011 to 2013, graduating from the Universities of L'Aquila, Italy, Hamburg, Germany and Gdansk, Poland.

He wrote his Master thesis at the Institute for Computational Physics in Stuttgart, Germany with the following title: ‘Molecular dynamics coupled to a thermal lattice Boltzmann code in order to model particle agglomeration in flow’.

In 2013, Cuenca was hired as a Research Fellow at the Faculty of Mathematics of the University of Hamburg in Germany, where in 2017 he completed his PhD in applied mathematics, entitled PhD in applied mathematics to engineering and Ultrasonic NDT: Persistent and Tangential homology for defect classification in Time of Flight Diffraction (TOFD). His work has been also published at international journals and conferences.

== Professional chess commentator ==
At the end of 2013 Cuenca joined the chess online platform chess24.com, together with his colleague IM David Martínez. He has been compared for his style with the Spanish streamer Ibai Llanos. He has been the official commentator at tournaments in several countries. Currently, Cuenca combines competition with broadcasting. He has also traveled around Europe and Latin America promoting chess through exhibitions, talks and other events. Although he is best known for his chess commentary in Spanish, he has also been a commentator in English in main events, sharing events with Judith Polgar.

== Chess training materials ==
Cuenca has also a number of chess online courses in several platforms for players of different levels, being his course to Philidor Defense one of his favorites. He has also given chess courses in English in the Saint Louis Chess Club both online and presential. In his YouTube channel he continues his work, started on chess24, summarising and explaining high level for an amateur level.

== Notable games ==
- Roeland Pruijssers vs Cuenca Jimenez, Bundesliga (2014/15), Bremen GER, Round 2, Oct-19 Giuoco Pianissimo (C53),0-1.

Cuenca considered himself a positional player with resilience to play long strategical games where a good endgame technique is needed. However, in this game he leads an opposing castling attack where the g-column is used thematically for a direct attack on the opposite king.

Pruijssers vs Cuenca, Bremen 2014

Position: g1 white king, f1 white rook, d1 white queen, c1 white bishop, a1 white rook, g2 white pawn, f2 white pawn, b2 white pawn, a2 white pawn, f3 white knight, e3 white knight, d3 white pawn, c3 white pawn, b3 white bishop, g4 black bishop, e4 white pawn, e5 black pawn, h6 black pawn, f6 black knight, d6 black pawn, c6 black knight, a6 black pawn, f7 black pawn, d7 black queen, c7 black pawn, b7 black pawn, a7 black bishop, g8 black rook, d8 black rook, c8 black king

Position after 14...0-0-0
1.e4 e5 2.Nf3 Nc6 3.Bc4 Bc5 4.c3 Nf6 5.d3 a6 6.Bb3 Ba7 7.O-O d6 8.h3 h6 9.Nbd2 g5 10.Nh2 g4 11.hxg4 Rg8 12.Nc4 Bxg4 13.Nf3 Qd7 14.Ne3 O-O-O 15.Nxg4 Rxg4 16.Ne1 Nh5 17.Be3 Rdg8 18.Qf3 Nf4 19.Bxf4 exf4 20.d4 Bxd4 21.Ba4 b5 22.e5 Rg3 23.Qh5 Rh3 24.Qd1 f3 25.cxd4 Qg4 0-1

== Selected bibliography ==
=== Academic publications ===
- Cuenca, J. F., & Iske, A. (2016). Persistent homology for defect detection in non-destructive evaluation of materials. The e-Journal of Nondestructive Testing, 21(01). ISSN 1435-4934.
- Cuenca, J. F., Iske, A., Labud, P. A., & Nemitz, O. (2016). Tangential Homology for Defect Detection in the Time of Flight Diffraction Method (TOFD). Proceedings in Applied Mathematics and Mechanics.
- Cuenca, J. F., & Iske, A. (2016). Persistent Homology for Defect Detection in Non-Destructive Evaluation of Materials. Hamburger Beiträge.
- Cuenca, J. F. (2013). Particle agglomeration in flow modelled with molecular dynamics coupled to a thermal Lattice Boltzmann code. TASK QUARTERLY, 17(3–4), 181–213.
- J. Cuenca, J. Rodríguez, M. Martín-Morales, Z. Sánchez-Roldán, M. Zamorano (2013) "Effects of olive residue biomass fly ash as filler in self-compacting concrete". Construction and Building Materials, 40: 702–709.
- M.Martín-Morales, J.Cuenca, P.López; "Characterization of the biomass ashes- Application in Mortars" in Spanish national congress of civil engineering: Society, Economy and Environment (2011) -. ISBN 978-84-380-0452-4.
- Martin-Morales, M., Cuenca, J., Lopez, P., Rodriguez, J., Zamorano, M., & Valverde, P. I. (2011, October). Self-compacting concrete with biomass fly ash: Preliminary results. In Proceeding of the Thirteenth International Waste Management and Landfill Symposium, Cagliari, Italy (pp. 3–7).

=== Conferences ===
- Conference at the University of Valencia

== See also ==
- Chess
- Miguel Santos Ruiz
