= World Chess Arena =

Internet chess server

World Chess / FIDE Online Arena
- Website type: Internet chess server
- Available in: Multilingual
- Owner: World Chess
- Website: worldchess.com
- Commercial: Yes
- Registration: Required
- Launched: 4 April 2014
- Current status: Active

World Chess Arena (formerly FIDE Online Arena) is the official Internet chess server of the International Chess Federation (FIDE), operated by World Chess Plc (LSE: CHSS). It is the only online platform where players can obtain official FIDE-recognized ratings and online titles. As of 2025, the platform is hosted on worldchess.com and marketed under the unified World Chess brand.

== History ==
The Arena was first announced by FIDE in 2013, with a test version going live in August and a full launch on 4 April 2014, inaugurated by then-FIDE President Kirsan Ilyumzhinov.

In its early years the platform offered official online ratings and a new set of internet-only FIDE titles: Arena Grandmaster (AGM), Arena International Master (AIM), Arena FIDE Master (AFM), and Arena Candidate Master (ACM). These titles were designed for the online environment but are listed on players' official FIDE profiles.

In 2019 the operation of the Arena was transferred to World Chess, the company which had previously organised the 2014, 2016, and 2018 World Chess Championships. Since then the service has been gradually integrated into the broader World Chess ecosystem of events, merchandise, and media.

== Development ==
A new version of the iOS app was released in 2021, followed by an Android release in 2024. In September 2021, FIDE and World Chess jointly announced that Arena ratings and titles would be directly integrated into official player profiles on the FIDE website.

In 2024 the site added coaching and personalised lesson features, allowing players to apply for a coach and follow structured training.

In 2025 the Arena was fully rebranded under the domain worldchess.com, positioning the service as the central hub for online play, events, and membership of World Chess.

== Membership ==
An internal FIDE report in 2015 recorded 4,805 registered members, of whom 2,078 were paying subscribers, with India as the largest national group.

By 2023 the platform reported over 730,000 registered accounts. In 2025 World Chess announced the milestone of one million registered users across worldchess.com, including the Arena.

== Arena titles ==
FIDE Online Arena awards four titles for reaching a required online rating and playing a minimum number of rated games: Arena Grandmaster (AGM), Arena International Master (AIM), Arena FIDE Master (AFM) and Arena Candidate Master (ACM). Unlike the classical titles of the same names, Arena titles do not require over-the-board norms.

In the FIDE rating list of 5 November 2026, 19,581 players were recorded with an Arena title: 965 AGM, 3,704 AIM, 8,140 AFM and 6,772 ACM. The same list recorded 20,084 classical open titles. Of the Arena title holders, 9,093 had no FIDE standard rating.

== Experiment to Convert Online Rating to OTB Rapid and Blitz Rating ==
FIDE and World Chess announced that they intend to run an experiment to potentially allow conversion of the online rating obtained on World Chess to OTB Rapid and Blitz rating, marking the first time players can obtain the official rating via online path. The experiment, expected to run for two years, subject to confirmation, is aimed, according to FIDE, to countries and regions where there are no rated tournaments. Players will be able to convert the rating once per year. Technical details are in discussion.

== Features ==
- Official FIDE-recognised online ratings in standard, rapid, blitz and bullet chess.
- Exclusive Arena titles (AGM, AIM, AFM, ACM).
- Integration with FIDE player profiles.
- Coaching marketplace and structured lessons.
- Mobile apps for iOS and Android.
- Access to official World Chess tournaments and broadcasts.
- Potential conversion of online rating to OTB Rapid and Blitz rating

== See also ==
- World Chess
- List of Internet chess servers
