= Vladimir Kramnik =

Russian chess grandmaster (born 1975)

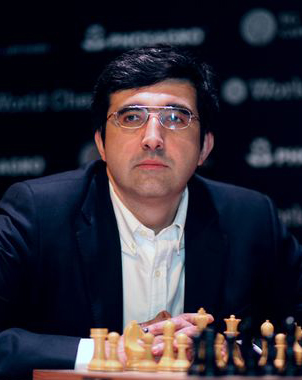
- Kramnik at the Candidates Tournament 2018

Personal information
- Born: Vladimir Borisovich Kramnik; 25 June 1975 (age 51) Tuapse, Russian SFSR, Soviet Union
- Spouse: Marie-Laure Germon (m. 2006)
- Children: 2

Chess career
- Country: Soviet Union (until 1991); Russia (since 1991)
- Title: Grandmaster (1992)
- World Champion: 2000–2006 (Classical); 2006–2007 (undisputed)
- FIDE rating: 2753 (November 2026)
- Peak rating: 2817 (October 2016)
- Peak ranking: No. 1 (January 1996)

Vladimir Borisovich Kramnik (Russian: Влади́мир Бори́сович Кра́мник; born 25 June 1975) is a Russian chess grandmaster. He was the Classical World Chess Champion from 2000 to 2006, and the 14th undisputed World Chess Champion from 2006 to 2007.

In 2000, Kramnik defeated Garry Kasparov and became the Classical World Chess Champion. He defended his title in 2004 against Peter Leko, and defeated the reigning FIDE World Champion Veselin Topalov in a unification match in 2006. As a result, Kramnik became the first undisputed World Champion, holding both the FIDE and Classical titles, since Kasparov split from FIDE in 1993.

In 2007, Kramnik lost the title to Viswanathan Anand, who won the World Chess Championship 2007 tournament ahead of Kramnik. He challenged Anand at the World Chess Championship 2008 to regain his title, but lost. He played in four more Candidates tournaments between 2012 and 2018. Kramnik publicly announced his retirement as a professional chess player in January 2019 to focus on projects relating to chess for children and education.

Kramnik reached a peak rating of 2817 in October 2016, which makes him the joint-eighth-highest-rated player of all time. He is widely recognized for his contributions to opening theory.

In recent years, Kramnik has been widely criticized by other professional chess players and the media for accusing fellow players of cheating without substantial evidence. Comments that he made before and after the death of Daniel Naroditsky, an American grandmaster that he repeatedly accused of cheating, prompted an investigation by the FIDE Ethics & Disciplinary Commission, which in July 2026 issued him a two-year worldwide ban, with the second year suspended for a three-year probationary period.

== Early career ==
Kramnik was born in the town of Tuapse, on the shores of the Black Sea. His father's birth name was Boris Sokolov, but he took his stepfather's surname when his mother (Vladimir's grandmother) remarried. His mother Irina Fedorovna is Ukrainian and is a music teacher; his biological father Boris Sokolov is a Russian painter and sculptor. As a child, Kramnik studied in the chess school established by Mikhail Botvinnik. His first notable result in a major tournament was his gold medal win as first reserve for the Russian team in the 1992 Chess Olympiad in Manila. His selection for the team caused some controversy in Russia at the time, as he was only a FIDE Master, but Garry Kasparov supported it. He scored eight wins, one draw, and no losses, a performance of 2958, which won a gold medal for best rating performance.

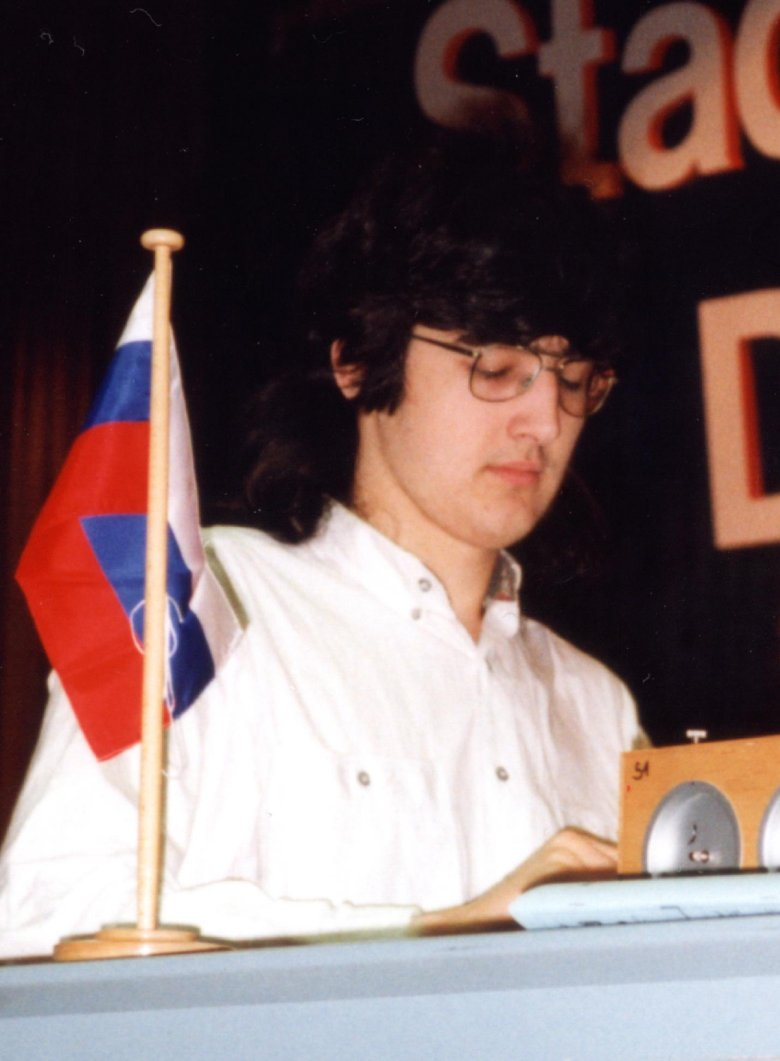
Kramnik in 1993

In 1993, Kramnik played in the very strong tournament in Linares. He finished fifth, beating the then world number three, Vasyl Ivanchuk, along the way. He followed this with a string of good results, but had to wait until 1995 for his first major tournament win at normal time controls, when he won the strong Dortmund tournament, finishing it unbeaten.

In 1995, Kramnik served as a second for Kasparov in the Classical World Chess Championship 1995 match against challenger Viswanathan Anand. Kasparov won the match 10½–7½.

In January 1996, Kramnik became the world number-one rated player; he had the same FIDE rating as Kasparov (2775), but was number one because he played more games during the rating period in question. This was the first time since 1985 that Kasparov was not world number one, and Kramnik's six-month stretch (January through June 1996) as world number one was the only time from January 1986 to March 2006 when Kasparov was not world number one. Kramnik was the youngest ever to reach world number one, breaking Kasparov's record; this record stood until Magnus Carlsen broke it in 2010.

Kramnik continued to produce good results, including winning at Dortmund (outright or tied) ten times from 1995 to 2011. He is the second of only 15 chess players to have reached a rating of 2800 (Kasparov was the first).

During his reign as world champion, Kramnik never regained the world number-one ranking, doing so only in January 2008 after he had lost the title to Viswanathan Anand; as in 1996, Kramnik had the same FIDE rating as Anand (2799) but was number one due to more games played within the rating period. Kramnik's 12 years between world number-one rankings is the longest since the 1971 inception of the FIDE ranking system.

== Chess career ==
=== Early attempts ===
In the mid- and late 1990s, Kramnik, although considered one of the strongest players in the world, suffered several setbacks in his attempts to qualify for a World Championship match. In 1994, he lost a quarterfinal candidates match for the PCA championship to Gata Kamsky 1½–4½, and later that year, lost a semifinal candidates match for the FIDE championship to Boris Gelfand with the score 3½–4½. In 1998, Kramnik faced Alexei Shirov in a Candidates match for the right to play Garry Kasparov for the Classical World Chess Championship, and lost 3½–5½. In 1999, Kramnik participated in the FIDE knockout championship in Las Vegas, and lost in the quarterfinals to Michael Adams 2–4.

=== 2000 World Championship ===
Suitable sponsorship was not found for a Kasparov–Shirov match, and it never took place. It appears Shirov refused to play for what he considered too small a prize fund. Kasparov decided to try to arrange a match with the highest rated-player according to FIDE's rating list. At the time Anand was the highest-rated player, but Anand refused the match. Therefore, in March 2000 Kasparov announced he would play a match against Kramnik, who at the time was third in the rating list behind Kasparov and Anand (Shirov was fourth). This was somewhat controversial, especially since he had lost the qualifier to Shirov. It made Kramnik the first player since 1935 to play a world championship match without qualifying.

In 2000, Kramnik played a 16-game match against Garry Kasparov in London, for the Classical Chess World Championship. Kramnik began the match as the underdog, but his adoption of the Berlin Defence to Kasparov's Ruy Lopez opening was very effective. With the white pieces, Kramnik pressed Kasparov hard, winning Games 2 and 10 and overlooking winning continuations in Games 4 and 6. Kasparov put up little fight thereafter, agreeing to short draws with the white pieces in Games 9 and 13. Kramnik won the match 8½–6½ without losing a game. This was only the second time in history that a World Champion had lost a match without winning a single game, the other time being Lasker in 1921. It also marked the first time Kasparov had lost a World Championship match.

Kramnik's performance won him the Chess Oscar for 2000; this was the first time he had received the award.

=== After London ===
In October 2002, Kramnik competed in Brains in Bahrain, an eight-game match against the chess computer Deep Fritz. Kramnik started well, taking a 3–1 lead after four games. But in game five, he made what was called the worst blunder of his career, losing a knight in a position that was probably drawn. He quickly resigned. He also resigned game six after making a speculative sacrifice, although subsequent analysis showed he had drawing chances in the final position. The last two games were drawn, and the match ended at 4–4.

In February 2004, Kramnik won the Tournament of Linares outright for the first time (he had tied for first with Garry Kasparov in 2000), finishing undefeated with a +2 score, ahead of Kasparov, the world's highest-rated player at the time.

=== 2004 title defense ===
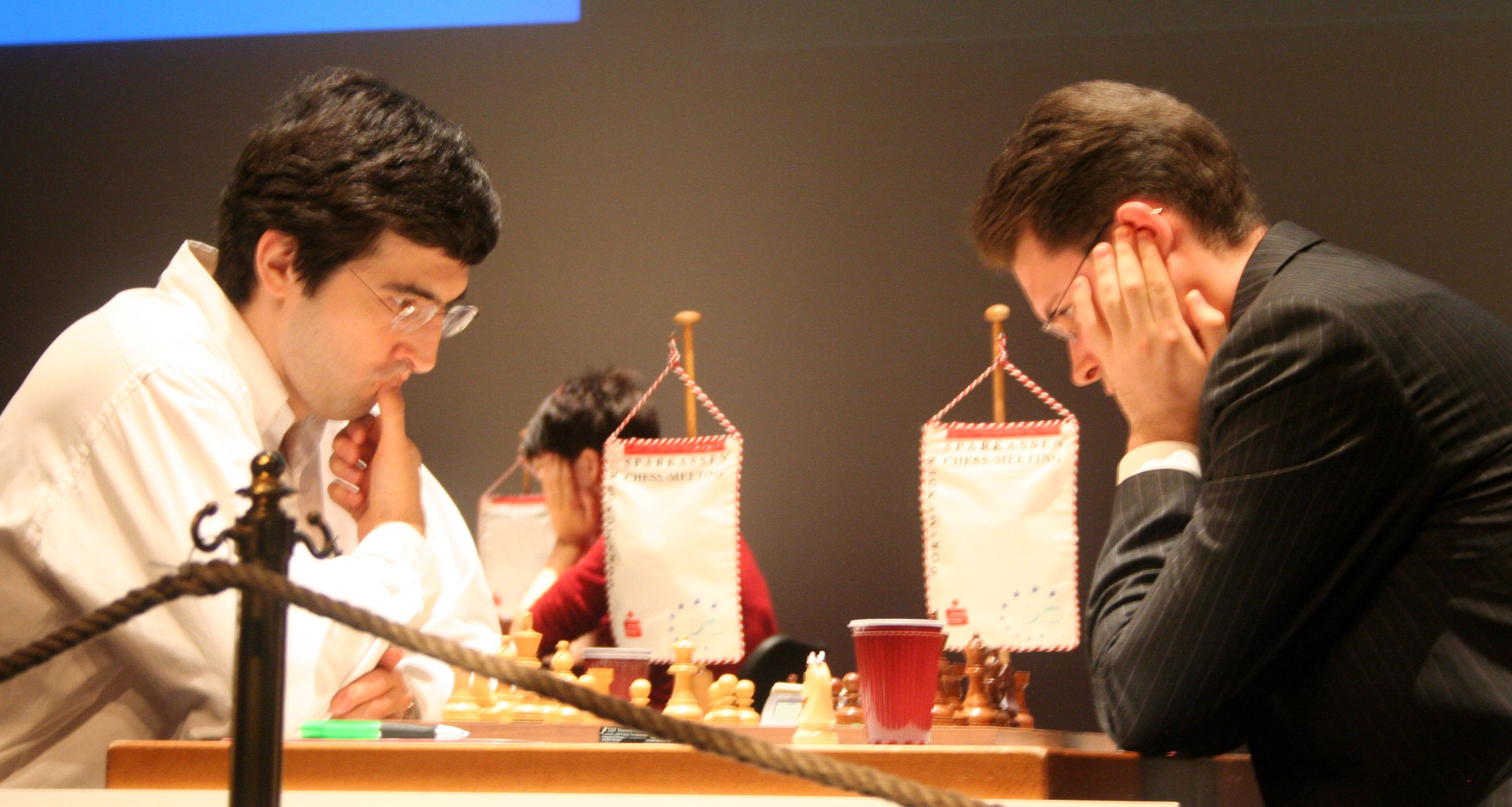
Kramnik playing against Leko in 2006

From 25 September 2004 until 18 October 2004, Kramnik retained his title as Classical World Chess Champion against challenger Péter Lékó at Brissago, Switzerland, by barely drawing the match in the last game. The 14-game match was poised in favor of Lékó right up until Kramnik won the final game, thus forcing a 7–7 draw and ensuring that Kramnik remained world champion. The prize fund was 1 million Swiss francs, which was about USD $770,000 at the time. Because of the drawn result, the prize was split between the two players.

=== 2006 Reunification match ===
When Garry Kasparov broke with FIDE, the federation governing professional chess, to play the 1993 World Championship with Nigel Short, he created a rift in the chess world. In response, FIDE sanctioned a match between Anatoly Karpov and Jan Timman for the FIDE World Championship, which Karpov won. Subsequently, the chess world had seen two "champions": the "classical" championship, claiming lineage dating back to Steinitz; and the FIDE-endorsed champion.

In April 2006, FIDE announced a reunification match between Kramnik and Topalov—the FIDE World Chess Championship 2006. The match took place in Elista, Kalmykia. After the first four games, Kramnik led 3–1 (out of a maximum of 12). After the fourth game, however, Topalov's coach/manager Silvio Danailov protested that Kramnik was using the toilet suspiciously frequently, implying that he was somehow receiving outside assistance whilst doing so. Topalov said that he would refuse to shake hands with Kramnik in the remaining games. The Appeals committee decided that the players' toilets be locked and that they be forced to use a shared toilet, accompanied by an assistant arbiter.

Kramnik refused to play the fifth game unless the original conditions agreed for the match were adhered to. As a result, the point was awarded to Topalov, reducing Kramnik's lead to 3–2. Kramnik stated that the appeals committee was biased and demanded that it be replaced. As a condition to continue the match, Kramnik insisted on playing the remaining games under the original conditions of the match contract, which allows use of the bathroom at the players' discretion.

The controversy resulted in a heavy volume of correspondence to Chessbase and other publications. The balance of views from fans was in support of Kramnik. Prominent figures in the chess world, such as John Nunn, Yasser Seirawan, and Bessel Kok also sided with Kramnik. The Russian and Bulgarian Chess Federations supported their respective players.

After twelve regular games the match was tied 6–6, although Kramnik continued to dispute the result of the unplayed fifth game until the end of the match. On 13 October 2006 the result of this disputed game became irrelevant as Kramnik won the rapid tie-break by a score of 2½–1½.

Kramnik's victory helped him win the Chess Oscar for 2006, the second of his career.

=== 2006 Deep Fritz match ===
Kramnik played a six-game match against the computer program Deep Fritz in Bonn, Germany, from 25 November to 5 December 2006, losing 2–4, with 2 losses and 4 draws. He received 500,000 Euros for playing and would have received twice as much had he won the match. Deep Fritz version 10 ran on a computer containing two Intel Core 2 Duo CPUs. Kramnik received a copy of the program in mid-October for testing, but the final version included an updated opening book. Except for limited updates to the opening book, the program was not allowed to be modified during the match. The endgame tablebases the program used were restricted to five pieces even though a complete six-piece tablebase was widely available.

The first game ended in a draw. A number of commentators claimed that Kramnik missed a win. Deep Fritz won game 2 due to a mistake by Kramnik, who failed to defend against a threatened mate-in-one. Susan Polgar called it the "blunder of the century". Games 3, 4, and 5 were draws. In game 6, Kramnik played the aggressive Sicilian Defense in an attempt to win with black and even the match, but was outplayed. Kramnik resigned.

This match turned out to be the last major human–computer match. According to one expert at the time, "I don't know what one could get out of [a further match] at this point. The science is done."

=== 2007 World Championship tournament in Mexico ===
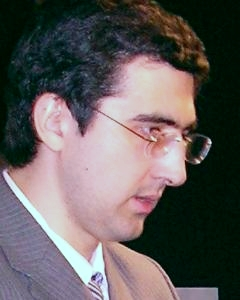
Kramnik, winner at Dortmund 2007

When Kramnik won the 2006 unification match, he also won Topalov's berth in the 2007 World Championship as the incumbent FIDE champion. Although the rationale behind his (and Garry Kasparov's) "classical" title is that the title should change hands by challenge match rather than by tournament, Kramnik stated that he would recognize the winner of this tournament as being the world champion.

In the tournament, held in September 2007, Kramnik and Anand drew both of their games but Kramnik finished second. The tournament, and the world championship, was won by Viswanathan Anand.

=== 2008 match ===
Pursuant to the agreement reached before the 2007 tournament, Kramnik and Anand played a match of the World Championship title in 2008 in Bonn. He fell victim to Anand's superior preparation, and lost three of the first six games (two with the white pieces). Kramnik's play gradually improved, and although he managed a 29-move victory in game 10, he did not win any other game, and lost the match to Anand by a score of 6½ to 4½ (three wins to Anand, one win to Kramnik, seven draws).

=== 2009 ===
Kramnik had exceptionally good results in 2009, winning once again in Dortmund and then winning the Category 21 (average Elo = 2763) Tal Memorial in Moscow with 6/9 and a 2883 rating performance ahead of world champion Anand, Vasyl Ivanchuk, Magnus Carlsen, Levon Aronian, Boris Gelfand, former FIDE world champion Ruslan Ponomariov, Peter Leko, Peter Svidler and Alexander Morozevich. At the time, the average Elo rating of the field made it the strongest tournament in history. Following this result, Kramnik stated that his goal was to regain the World Championship title.

He also participated in the London Chess Classic in December, finishing second to Magnus Carlsen, losing their head-to-head encounter on the Black side of the English Opening. Kramnik's performance in 2009 allowed his rating (average of July 2009 and January 2010 ratings) to be high enough to qualify for the Candidates Tournament to determine the challenger for the World Chess Championship 2012.

=== 2010 ===
Kramnik began 2010 at the Corus chess tournament in the Netherlands, during which he defeated new world number one Carlsen with the black pieces in their head-to-head encounter, ending Carlsen's 36-game unbeaten streak. A late loss to Viswanathan Anand knocked him out of first place, and Kramnik finished with 8/13, tying for second place with Alexei Shirov behind Carlsen's 8½ points.

In May 2010 it was revealed that Kramnik had aided Viswanathan Anand in preparation for the World Chess Championship 2010 against challenger Veselin Topalov. Anand won the match 6½–5½ to retain the title.

In April–May 2010 he tied for 1st–3rd with Shakhriyar Mamedyarov and Gata Kamsky in the President's Cup in Baku and won the event on tie-break after all finished on 5/7.

Kramnik also participated in Dortmund, but had a subpar showing, losing to eventual champion Ruslan Ponomariov and finishing in joint third place with 5/10.

He then participated in the Grand Slam Chess Masters preliminary tournament in Shanghai from 3 to 8 September, where he faced world number four Levon Aronian, Alexei Shirov, and Wang Hao; the top two scorers qualified for the Grand Slam final supertournament from 9 to 15 October in Bilbao against Carlsen and Anand. Scoring 3/6, Kramnik tied for second place with Aronian behind the winner Shirov's 4½/6. In the blitz playoff, Kramnik defeated Aronian to qualify along with Shirov for the Grand Slam final.

Shortly after qualifying for the last stage of the Grand Slam, Kramnik played on board one for the Russian team in the 2010 Olympiad. He scored +2–0=7.

Following the Olympiad, Kramnik participated in the Grand Slam Chess Masters final in Bilbao where he competed against Anand, Carlsen and Shirov. The average rating of the field was 2789, the highest in history. After defeating world number one Carlsen for the second consecutive time, and then Shirov in his first two games, Kramnik drew his final four games to finish in clear first with 4/6. This gave Kramnik the distinction of having won the two strongest tournaments in chess history.

Kramnik's attempt to defend his 2009 title at the Tal Memorial in Moscow ended with a 7th place, while he finished 5th in the London Chess Classic in England.

=== 2011 ===
2011 brought varied results. In Wijk aan Zee Kramnik shared fifth with Maxime Vachier-Lagrave, and in the Candidates he was eliminated by Alexander Grischuk. He won Dortmund for the tenth time, with Lê Quang Liêm in second place, and shared third behind Peter Svidler and Alexander Morozevich in the Russian Superfinal. Kramnik won the third London Chess Classic with four wins and four draws, and a rating performance over 2900 Elo. Hikaru Nakamura came second. However, in the earlier 6th Tal Memorial 2011 Moscow he came 8th out of 10, with 2 losses (to Nepomniachtchi and Svidler) and 7 draws.

=== 2012 ===
Kramnik played a friendly match against Levon Aronian, which finished 3–3 (with a win for Aronian in a rapid game that didn't count as tiebreak). In Tal Memorial he shared fourth place behind Magnus Carlsen, Fabiano Caruana and Teimour Radjabov. He finished second in the London Chess Classic behind Carlsen.

=== 2013 ===
Kramnik played in the 2013 Candidates Tournament, which took place in London, from 15 March to 1 April. He finished with 8½ points, sharing the first place with Magnus Carlsen, who won due to having better tiebreaks.

In the 2013 Alekhine Memorial tournament, held from 20 April to 1 May, Kramnik finished seventh, with +2−2=5.

In the 2013 Tal Memorial tournament, held from 13 to 23 June, Kramnik finished tenth out of ten, with +0−3=6.

In the Chess World Cup 2013, held in Norway from 11 August to 2 September, Kramnik finished in first place, defeating Dmitry Andreikin in the four-game final match 2½–1½.

=== 2014 ===
Kramnik's win at the Chess World Cup 2013 qualified him for the Candidates Tournament 2014. He finished equal third on 7 out of 14, and took third place on tie breaks.

=== 2015 ===
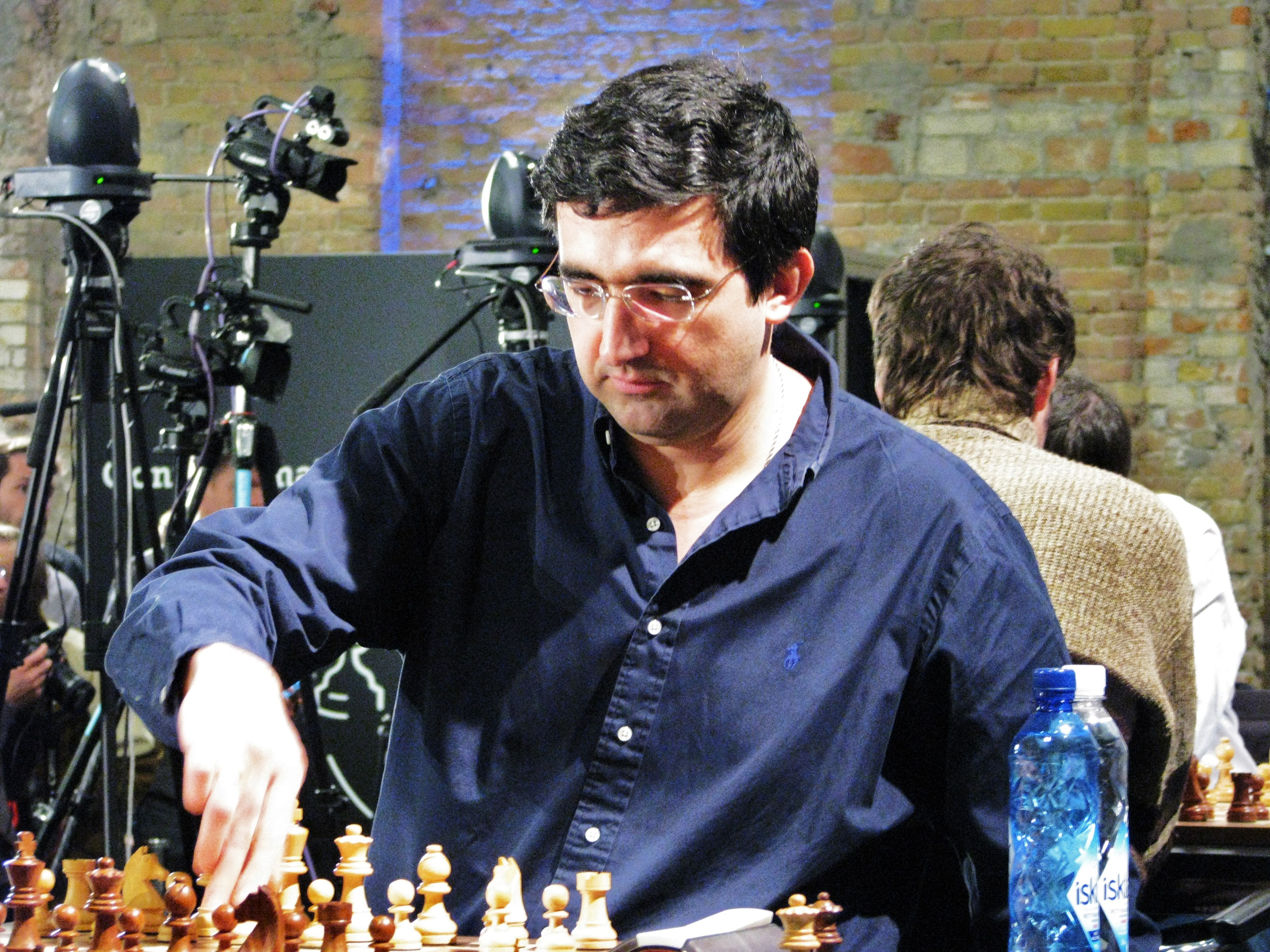
Kramnik in the 18th round of the World Blitz Championship 2015 (winning against Levon Aronian)

Kramnik did not succeed in defending his title in the Chess World Cup. In the third round he was defeated by Andreikin. He narrowly missed out on qualifying by rating for the Candidates Tournament 2016. This was the first Candidates Tournament Kramnik had missed, since their re-introduction in the 2012 World Championship cycle.

He participated as one of 130 grandmasters at the combined World Rapid and Blitz Championships in Berlin that was organized by FIDE from 10 to 14 October. In the World Rapid Championship he remained unbeaten, winning five games of 15 and reaching the 6th place.

Kramnik finished third in the World Blitz Championship in Berlin with 15 / 21. He was a half-point behind the winner Alexander Grischuk and lost second place on tiebreak to Maxime Vachier-Lagrave.

=== 2016 ===
Kramnik competed in the Dortmund Sparkassen Chess Meeting, held from 9 – 17 July and finished joint second with 4/7.

He played in the Tal Memorial (a ten-player round-robin tournament) in Moscow from 26 September – 6 October. He finished sixth with 4.5/9 in the opening blitz round-robin on 25 September, meaning that he was given one more game to play with the black pieces than with the white in the classical tournament. He finished joint fifth in the classical tournament, again with 4.5/9.

He participated in three of the four events of the Grand Chess Tour (he withdrew from the Sinquefield Cup due to health issues and was replaced by Svidler): Kramnik played the Paris Grand Chess Tour speed chess tournament, the Your Next Move Grand Chess Tour speed chess tournament, and the London Chess Classic classical chess tournament. All the events of the Grand Chess Tour were 10-player round robin tournaments.

The Paris Grand Chess Tour tournament was held from 9 – 12 June and was composed of a mixture of rapid and blitz games. Kramnik finished ninth with 5.5/18, above only comparatively low-rated wildcard player Laurent Fressinet.

The Your Next Move Grand Chess Tour tournament was held from 17 – 20 June in Leuven, Belgium. Like the Paris GCT, it was composed of a combination of rapid and blitz games. Kramnik finished joint eighth with 2.5/9.

The London Chess Classic was held from 9 – 18 December. Kramnik finished joint third with 5/9.

=== 2017 ===
Kramnik was still a 2800+ player for most of 2017 and therefore still competing at the highest levels. He finished second in the Gashimov Memorial tournament (5/9) behind Shakriyar Mamedyarov (5.5/9), third in Norway Chess behind Nakamura and Aronian. He finished fourth in the Dortmund Sparkassen. He was knocked out by Vasyl Ivanchuk in the World Cup of 2017 in the third round. In December he performed in a simultaneous exhibition on 30 chessboards in Geneva, winning by 29,5-0,5.

=== 2018 ===
Kramnik seemed set to again narrowly miss qualifying for the Candidates on rating, but in late 2017 he was awarded the wild-card entry to the Candidates Tournament 2018. Kramnik started the Candidates tournament well, including a brilliant win with black against Levon Aronian in Round 3. But he faded and finished equal fifth out of eight, on 6.5 points of 14.

=== 2019 ===
Kramnik competed in the 81st Tata Steel Chess Tournament in January, where he finished last with a score of 4½/13 (+2–6=5). He subsequently announced his retirement from professional chess: "I already decided to finish my professional chess career a couple of months ago and now, after having played my last tournament, I would like to announce it publicly." He said he might still participate in rapid and blitz events and hold simultaneous exhibitions. He stated that he intends to focus on chess for children and education.

=== Online chess ===
Kramnik was previously active on the online chess platform Chess.com, where he played blitz games and regularly participated in tournaments, including Titled Tuesday. He closed his account on June 24, 2025.

== Anti-cheating campaigns and controversies ==
In September 2023, Kramnik was defeated by Hans Niemann in an online game on Chess.com. In a second game, Kramnik deliberately played into a Fool's Mate as black which was seen as a protest and an unspoken cheating accusation. Niemann resigned the game in response. Kramnik then announced he would no longer play on Chess.com stating that there were too many cheaters. Niemann then publicly addressed Kramnik, stating he would like an opportunity to work with him in a training camp so he could evaluate his play, and also praised Kramnik's contributions to chess. Kramnik accepted the offer which led to a reconciliation, with the pair then developing a working relationship.

In November 2023, Kramnik posted on his Chess.com profile that an unnamed high-level player (later identified as GM Hikaru Nakamura) had scored 45.5 points from 46 consecutive blitz games against opposition with an average rating of approximately 2950. Nakamura interpreted Kramnik's statement as a cheating accusation and criticized Kramnik for "trying to sow the seeds of doubt." Kramnik later claimed he was not accusing Nakamura of cheating, but reporting a statistical anomaly that he felt merited investigation. He launched a petition on Change.org calling for Chess.com to perform a detailed examination of Nakamura's numerous streaks.

In response to Kramnik's accusations, Chess.com asked Canadian statistician Jeff Rosenthal to analyse Nakamura's winning streaks. In August 2024, Rosenthal published a report concluding that Nakamura's streaks were firmly within statistical expectation. Kramnik criticized various aspects of the report's methodology, namely possible bias in the type and scope of data analysed by Rosenthal, and the manner in which he determined probabilites of game outcomes. Rosenthal updated his study to address Kramnik's criticisms, but Kramnik maintained his critiques.

In December 2023, after Kramnik had implicated several other players, Chess.com closed Kramnik's blog and muted his account on their platform. Later, Kramnik was found to be violating Chess.com's terms of service by playing on Denis Khismatullin's account. Chess.com responded by banning Kramnik from their prize money tournaments. Kramnik then blamed the whistleblower, IM Matvey Galchenko, for the fact he could no longer stream Titled Tuesday.

In May 2024, Kramnik published a list of the players who were most accurate with less than 10 seconds on their clock in Titled Tuesdays. Players on the list with lower FIDE blitz ratings were highlighted in red. The list included Czech GM David Navara, though he was not highlighted. Navara submitted a formal complaint to FIDE detailing 4 instances in which Kramnik possibly violated FIDE's conduct standards: Kramnik's own prior violation of fair-play rules by playing on someone else's account; a pattern of poorly substantiated public accusations against other players, including minors; flawed statistical methodology; and the offensive nature of the tweet. A year later, Navara recounted in a blog post the severe psychological impact Kramnik's accusations had on him, saying they "induced my suicidal thoughts and caused me a lot of pain." Kramnik announced his intention to sue Navara, Chess.com, and Chessdom.com for defamation, demanding a public retraction and apology, and said a criminal case was forthcoming.

After Kramnik had insinuated that Peruvian GM José Martínez Alcántara was cheating in online tournaments, Spanish commentator David Martínez invited Kramnik and José Martínez to a match in Madrid titled Clash of Claims. The match would consist of 36 blitz games, with half of them being played over-the-board and half being played online. Martínez won the match 14.5-11.5, but Kramnik was disadvantaged by several technical difficulties. In August, World Chess organized a rematch titled Clash of Blames to be held in London with the same format. Kramnik won this match 19-17 and concluded that there is no substantial difference between a player's over-the-board and online playing strength, a finding substantiated by American statistician Kenneth W. Regan.

During October and November 2024, Kramnik published several videos accusing Daniel Naroditsky of cheating. These accusations contributed to a severe decline in Naroditsky's mental health during this period. Several top players, including Nakamura, Fabiano Caruana, and Levon Aronian, came to Naroditsky's defense and criticized Kramnik for making unsubstantiated cheating accusations. After Naroditsky's death from probable cardiac arrhythmia due to systemic sarcoidosis on 19 October 2025, the chess community vociferously condemned Kramnik, with Indian GM Nihal Sarin writing that Kramnik had "taken a life" in a statement to The Indian Express. A petition to FIDE to revoke Kramnik's GM title gained over 52,000 signatures. Kramnik expressed condolences to Naroditsky's family, but denied having made personal insults towards him and claimed to be the victim of "a cynical smear campaign [...] linking me—without any factual basis—to Daniel's untimely death."

FIDE began reviewing Kramnik’s public statements two days after Naroditsky's death. British IM Jovanka Houska expressed support for the FIDE inquiry, saying that players "should not be allowed to accuse others of cheating without consequences". In July 2026, the FIDE Ethics & Disciplinary Commission issued Kramnik a two-year worldwide ban from participating in FIDE competitions and being involved in chess-related activities for unsubstantiated accusations against Navara and Naroditsky. The final 12 months of the ban are suspended for a three-year probationary period. Kramnik plans to appeal the verdict.

== Personal life ==
On 31 December 2006, Kramnik married the French journalist Marie-Laure Germon in a civil ceremony in Paris. A religious ceremony was held at the Alexander Nevsky Cathedral on 4 February 2007. They have two children and reside in Geneva.

Kramnik has been diagnosed with ankylosing spondylitis, an uncommon form of arthritis. It caused him great physical discomfort while playing before being treated.

== Notable tournament victories ==
- 1990 Russian Championship, Kuibyshev (classical) I
- 1991 World Championship (U18), Guarapuava (classical) I
- 1992 Chalkidiki (classical) 7½/11 I
- 1994 Overall result PCA Intel Grand Prix'94 I
- 1995 Dortmund (classical) 7/9 I
- 1995 Horgen (classical) 7/10 I–II
- 1995 Belgrade (classical) 8/11 I–II
- 1996 Monaco 16/22 I
- 1996 Dos Hermanas (classical) 6/9 I–II
- 1996 Dortmund (classical) 7/9 I–II
- 1997 Dos Hermanas (classical) 6/9 I–II
- 1997 Dortmund (classical) 6½/9 I
- 1997 Tilburg (classical) 8/11 I–III
- 1998 Wijk aan Zee (classical) 8½/13 I–II
- 1998 Dortmund (classical) 6/9 I–III
- 1998 Monaco (blindfold and rapidplay) 15/22 I
- 1999 Monaco (blindfold and rapidplay) 14½/22 I
- 2000 Linares (classical) 6/10 I–II
- 2000 Dortmund (classical) 6/9 I–II
- 2001 Match Kramnik vs. Leko (rapidplay) 7–5
- 2001 Match Botvinnik memorial Kramnik vs. Kasparov (classical) 2–2
- 2001 Match Botvinnik memorial Kramnik vs Kasparov (rapidplay) 3–3
- 2001 Monaco (blindfold and rapidplay) 15/22 I–II
- 2001 Match Kramnik vs. Anand (rapidplay) 5–5
- 2001 Dortmund (classical) 6½/10 I–II
- 2002 Match Advanced Chess Kramnik vs. Anand (León) 3½–2½
- 2003 Linares (classical) 7/12 I–II
- 2003 Cap d'Agde (France)
- 2004 Handicap Simul (classical)
- 2004 Kramnik vs. National Team of Germany 2½–1½
- 2004 Linares (classical) 7/12 I
- 2004 Monaco (overall result) 14½/22 I–II
- 2006 Gold medal at Turin Olympiad with overall best performance (2847) 7/10
- 2006 Dortmund (classical) 4½/7 I
- 2007 Monaco (blindfold and rapidplay) 15½/22 I
- 2007 Dortmund (classical) 5/7 I
- 2007 Tal Memorial 6½/9 I
- 2009 Dortmund 6½/9 I
- 2009 Zürich (rapidplay) 5/7 I
- 2009 Tal Memorial 6/9 I
- 2010 President's Cup in Baku (rapidplay) 5/7 I–III
- 2010 Bilbao Grand Slam final 4/6 I
- 2011 Dortmund 7/10 I
- 2011 Hoogeveen 4½/6 I
- 2011 London Chess Classic 6/8 I
- 2013 Chess World Cup 2013

He has won three team gold medals and three individual medals at Chess Olympiads.

== World championship matches and qualifiers ==
- PCA Quarterfinals, June 1994, New York, Kramnik–Gata Kamsky (1½–4½).
- FIDE Semifinals, August 1994 Sanghi Nagar, Kramnik–Boris Gelfand (3½–4½).
- Classical WCC Candidates Match, 1998, Cazorla, Kramnik–Alexei Shirov (3½–5½).
- FIDE WCC Knockout Quarterfinals, July 1999, Las Vegas, Kramnik–Michael Adams (2–4, including rapid playoff).
- Classical World Chess Championship 2000, London, Kramnik–Garry Kasparov (8½–6½), Kramnik wins the Classical title.
- Classical World Chess Championship 2004, Brissago, Kramnik–Péter Lékó (7–7), Kramnik retains the Classical title.
- FIDE World Chess Championship 2006, Elista, Kramnik–Topalov (6–6, 2½–1½ rapid playoff), Kramnik unifies the title.
- FIDE World Chess Championship 2007 Runner up, Mexico City (loses the title to Anand, joint second with Gelfand).
- World Chess Championship 2008, Bonn, Kramnik–Anand (4½–6½), Anand retains.
- World Chess Championship 2012 Candidates Match Quarterfinals, April 2011, Kazan, Kramnik–Radjabov (2–2, 2–2 rapid playoff, 2½–1½ blitz playoff), Kramnik advances.
- World Chess Championship 2012 Candidates Match Semifinals, April 2011, Kazan, Kramnik–Grischuk (2–2, 2–2 rapid playoff, ½–1½ blitz playoff), Kramnik eliminated.
- World Chess Championship 2013 Runner-up, Candidates Tournament, March–April 2013, London, +4−1=9.
- World Chess Championship 2014 Third place, Candidates Tournament, Khanty-Mansiysk, +3−3=8.
- He failed to qualify for the Candidates Tournament 2016, after narrowly missing a qualifying place on rating, and being eliminated in the third round of the Chess World Cup 2015.
- He played in the Candidates Tournament 2018 as the organizer's nominee, placing fifth with +3−4=7.

== Assessment and legacy ==
=== Playing style ===
Kasparov has described Kramnik's style as pragmatic and tenacious, in the latter similar to Anatoly Karpov. He is one of the toughest opponents to defeat, losing only one game in over 100 leading up to his match with Kasparov, including 80 consecutive games without a loss. Kasparov did not defeat Kramnik during their 2000 World Championship match, partly due to Kramnik's use of the Berlin Defence of the Ruy Lopez. Kramnik is renowned for his endgame skills.

=== Contributions to chess ===
Kramnik has significantly shaped opening theory in chess. Anand said of him in 2012: "I don't know exactly how many lines he's established, but you get the impression that for the last 10 years we've only been using his ideas [...] His stamp on opening theory is much more significant than mine." Kramnik's results with the white pieces against the King's Indian Defence made Kasparov drop the opening from his repertoire, and caused the opening to drop in popularity from top-level play for many years. His use of the Berlin Defense in his 2000 match against Kasparov led to a massive increase in its popularity. Kramnik was the world's leading exponent of Petrov's Defence for much of his career and also revived the Catalan Opening.

=== Makruk ===
Kramnik also plays makruk. On 1 May 2004, while visiting the Federal Exhibition Hall, he immediately learned the rules and beat Dr. René Gralla. In his opinion, Thai chess is more strategic than Indian (international); players need to plan combinations with care, since Thai chess can be compared to the endgame in international chess. As the reigning world chess champion, he expressed his wish to play a mixed match of makruk and chess with the reigning makruk champion Tor Pagnaam.

=== Other chess variants ===
In 2020, Kramnik collaborated with Deep Mind to study several chess variants, by playing against a version of AlphaZero that had self-trained on those variants. The variants included No Castling Chess, a variant where players were allowed to capture their own pieces as well as those of their opponent, and a few others. Kramnik and the Deep Mind researchers released a joint paper in September 2020 about the study results.

== Notable games ==
Aronian vs. Kramnik, Berlin 2018

Position: h1 white king, d1 white rook, c1 white queen, a1 white rook, e2 black queen, b2 white pawn, a2 white pawn, g3 black pawn, f3 black pawn, d3 black rook, c3 white pawn, a3 white knight, h5 black knight, g5 white pawn, d5 white pawn, c5 black pawn, c6 black pawn, b7 black pawn, a7 black pawn, e8 black king

Position after 26...Qe2
- Levon Aronian vs. Kramnik, Candidates Tournament 2018, Berlin, Round 3; Ruy Lopez, Berlin Defense (C65)
  Using an opening novelty discovered years earlier, Kramnik overwhelms Aronian on the board, foregoing castling in favor of the attack, culminating in a rook sacrifice followed by imminent checkmate against the white king.
1.e4 e5 2.Nf3 Nc6 3.Bb5 Nf6 4.d3 Bc5 5.Bxc6 dxc6 6.0-0 Qe7 7.h3 Rg8 8.Kh1 Nh5 9.c3 g5 10.Nxe5 g4 11.d4 Bd6 12.g3 Bxe5 13.dxe5 Qxe5 14.Qd4 Qe7 15.h4 c5 16.Qc4 Be6 17.Qb5+ c6 18.Qa4 f5 19.Bg5 Rxg5 20.hxg5 f4 21.Qd1 Rd8 22.Qc1 fxg3 23.Na3 Rd3 24.Rd1 Bd5 25.f3 gxf3 26.exd5 Qe2 (diagram) 27.Re1 g2+ 0–1

== Chess books ==
- Vladimir Kramnik (1994). Mikhail Tal I-III (2017 Games) 3 Chess Books. Chess Stars.
- S.W. Gordon, T. Taylor (1994). Young Lions: Vladimir Kramnik. 3 Girls Publishing.
- Eduard E. Gufeld (1994). Führende Schachmeister der Gegenwart Wladimir Kramnik. Rochade Europa.
- Vladimir Kramnik, Mark Dvoretsky; et al. (1996). Positional Play. Batsford Ltd. ISBN 978-0-7134-7879-2.
- Vladimir Kramnik, Iakov Damsky (2000). My Life and Games. Everyman Chess. ISBN 978-1-85744-270-0.
- Vladimir Kramnik; et al. (2000). Proryv. МАИК. ISBN 978-5-7846-0032-5.
- Evgeny Bareev, Ilya Levitov (2007). From London to Elista: The Inside Story of the World Chess Championship Matches that Vladimir Kramnik Won Against Garry Kasparov, Peter Leko, and Veselin Topalov. New In Chess. ISBN 978-9056912192.
- D. Barlov, P. Ostojic (2006). Vladimir Kramnik. Chess Emperors.
- Igor Sukhin, Vladimir Kramnik (2007). Chess Gems: 1,000 Combinations You Should Know. Mongoose Press. ISBN 978-0-9791482-5-5.
- Daniel Lovas (2007). Vladmir Kramnik (The Chess Greats of the World). Caissa Chess Books. ISBN 978-963-87141-5-2.
- Alexander Kalinin (2011). Vladimir Kramnik. Great Chess Combinations. Russian Chess House. ISBN 978-5-94693-171-7.
- Richard Forster, Vladimir Kramnik (2011). The Zurich Chess Club, 1809–2009. McFarland & Co Inc. ISBN 978-0-7864-6064-9.
- Cyrus Lakdawala (2012). Kramnik: Move by Move. Everyman Chess. ISBN 978-1-85744-991-4.

== Videos by Kramnik ==
- Kramnik, Vladimir. 2007. My Path to the Top DVD. Chessbase. ISBN 9783866810433

== See also ==
- List of chess games between Anand and Kramnik
- List of chess games between Kasparov and Kramnik

Awards
| Preceded by Garry Kasparov | Classical World Chess Champion; 2000–2007 | Succeeded by Viswanathan Anand |
| Preceded by Veselin Topalov | FIDE World Chess Champion; 2006–2007 | Succeeded by Viswanathan Anand |
Achievements
| Preceded by Garry Kasparov; Viswanathan Anand | World No. 1; 1 January 1996 – 30 June 1996; 1 January 2008 – 31 March 2008 | Succeeded by Garry Kasparov; Viswanathan Anand |
