= Index of DOS games (C) =

This is an index of DOS games.

This list has been split into multiple pages. Please use the Table of Contents to browse it.

Title	Released	Developer(s)	Publisher(s)
Cabal	1988	Tad Corporation	Capcom
Cadaver	1990	Bitmap Brothers	Image Works
Cadaver: The Payoff	1990	Bitmap Brothers	Image Works
Cadillacs and Dinosaurs: The Second Cataclysm	1994	Rocket Science Games	Sega, BMG Interactive
Caesar	1992	Impressions Games	Sierra Entertainment
Caesar II	1995	Impressions Games	Sierra Entertainment
California Games	1987	Epyx	Epyx
California Games 2	1990	Epyx	Epyx
Campaign	1992	Empire Interactive	Empire Interactive
Campaign II	1993	Empire Interactive	Empire Interactive
Cannon Fodder	1993	Sensible Software	Virgin Interactive
Cannon Fodder 2	1994	Sensible Software	Virgin Interactive
Capitalism	1995	Enlight	Interactive Magic
Capitalism Plus	1996	Enlight	Interactive Magic
Captain Bible in Dome of Darkness	1994	Bridgestone Multimedia Group	Bridgestone Multimedia Group
Captain Blood	1988	Exxos	Infogrames
Captain Comic II: Fractured Reality	1990	Michael Denio	ComputerEasy
Captain Dynamo	1993	Codemasters	Codemasters
Captain Power and the Soldiers of the Future	1988	Box Office Software	Box Office Software
Captive	1990	Mindscape	Mindscape
Cardinal of the Kremlin, The	1990	Capstone Software	IntraCorp
Car & Driver	1992	Looking Glass Studios	Electronic Arts
Card Sharks	1988	Softie	ShareData
Carmageddon	1997	Stainless Software Ltd.	SCi
Carmageddon Max Pack	1997	Stainless Software Ltd.	SCi
Carmageddon Splat Pack	1997	Stainless Software Ltd.	SCi
Carrier Command	1989	Realtime Games	Rainbird Software
Carriers at War	1992	Strategic Studies Group	Strategic Studies Group
Carriers at War II	1993	Strategic Studies Group	Strategic Studies Group
Carrier Strike	1992	Strategic Simulations	Strategic Simulations
CART Racing	1997	Papyrus Design Group	Sierra On-Line
Case of the Cautious Condor, The	1992	Tiger Media	Airwave Adventure
Castaway - The Ordeal Begins	1995	John Gallon	John Gallon
Castle Adventure	1984	Kevin Bales	
Castle Master	1990	Teque Software Development	Incentive Software, Domark
Castle of Dr. Brain	1991	Sierra Online	Sierra Online
Castles	1991	Quicksilver Software	Interplay Productions
Castles: The Northern Campaign	1992	Quicksilver Software	Interplay Productions
Castles II: Siege and Conquest	1995	Quicksilver Software	Interplay Entertainment
Castlevania	1990	Distinctive Software	Konami
Castle Wolfenstein	1984	Muse Software	Muse Software
Catacomb	1991	Softdisk	Softdisk
Catacomb II	1990	PC Arcade	Verbatim PC disk
Catacomb 3-D	1991	id Software	Gamer's Edge, Softdisk
Catacomb Abyss	1992	Gamer's Edge	Softdisk
Catacomb Armageddon	1992	Softdisk	Froggman
Catacomb Apocalypse	1993	Softdisk	Froggman
Catfight	1996	Phantom Card	Atlantean Interactive
Caveman Ughlympics	1988	Dynamix	Electronic Arts
Caverns of Kroz	1987	Scott Miller	Apogee Software
Caverns of Xaskazien	1995	Jeff Sinasac	Little Devils
CD-Man	1992	Scandinavian PC Systems	Creative Dimensions
C-Dogs	1997	Ronny Wester	Ronny Wester
Celtic Tales - Balor of the Evil Eye	1995	Koei	Koei
Centerfold Squares	1988	Artworx Software Company	Artworx Software Company
Centipede	1983	Atari	Atari
Centurion: Defender of Rome	1990	Bits of Magic	Electronic Arts
C.E.O.	1995	Artdink Corporation	Infogrames
Challenge of the Ancient Empires	1990	The Learning Company	The Learning Company
Challenge of the Five Realms	1992	MicroProse	MicroProse
Championship Baseball	1986	Gamestar	Activision
Championship Lode Runner	1984	Broderbund	Broderbund
Championship Manager	1992	Intelek	Domark
Championship Manager 93/94	1993	Sports Interactive	Domark
Championship Manager 2	1995	Sports Interactive	Eidos Interactive
Championship Manager 96/97	1996	Sports Interactive, Eidos Interactive	Eidos Interactive
Championship Manager: Season 97/98	1997	Sports Interactive	Eidos Interactive
Champions of Krynn	1990	Strategic Simulations	Strategic Simulations
Chaos Control	1995	Philips Interactive Media	Philips Interactive Media
Chaos Engine, The	1993	Bitmap Brothers	Renegade Software
Chaos Strikes Back	1989	FTL Games	FTL Games
Charlie II	2001	Wiering Software	Wiering Software
Chess	1981	International PC Owners	International PC Owners
Chess Champion 2175	1990	Oxford Softworks	Oxford Softworks
Chess Player 2150	1989	Oxford Softworks	Oxford Softworks
Chess Simulator	1990	Oxford Softworks	Infogrames
Chessbase 1.0	1987	Matthias Wullenweber, Mathias Feist	Chessbase
Chessmaster 2000	1986	David Kittinger	Software Country
Chessmaster 3000	1991	David Kittinger	Software Toolworks
Chewy: Esc from F5	1995	New Generation Software	Play Byte
Chex Quest	1996	Digital Café	Digital Café
Chex Quest 2	1997	Digital Café	Digital Café
Chicago 90	1989	Microïds	Microïds
Chip 'N Dale Rescue Rangers: The Adventure in Nimnul's Castle	1990	Riedel Software Productions	Hi-Tech Expressions
Chip's Challenge	1991	Epyx	Epyx
Christmas Lemmings	1991	DMA Design	Psygnosis
Chronicles of the Sword	1996	Synthetic Dimensions	Psygnosis
Chronomaster	1995	DreamForge Intertainment	IntraCorp, Capstone Software
Chrono Quest	1988	Infomedia	Psygnosis
Chuckie Egg	1985	A&F Software	A&F Software
Chuck Yeager's Advanced Flight Trainer	1987	Ned Lerner	Electronic Arts
Chuck Yeager's Air Combat	1991	Brent Iverson	Electronic Arts
Chub Gam 3D: Director's Cut	1998	ChubGamSoft	ChubGamSoft
Circuit's Edge	1996	Westwood Studios	Infocom
Cisco Heat	1991	Image Works	Image Works
The City of Lost Children	1997	Psygnosis	Psygnosis
Civil War	1983	International PC Owners	International PC Owners
Civil War, The	1995	Empire Interactive	Dagger Interactive Technologies
Clash of Steel: World War II, Europe 1939-1945	1993	Strategic Simulations	Strategic Simulations
Classic Text Adventure Masterpieces	1996	Infocom	Infocom
Clive Barker's Nightbreed: The Action Game	1990	Impact Software Development	Ocean Software
Clive Barker's Nightbreed: The Interactive Movie	1990	Impact Software Development	Ocean Software
Clockwiser: Time is Running Out	1994	Team Hoi Games	Rasputin Software
Cloud Kingdoms	1990	Electralyte	Millennium Interactive
The Clue!	1994	Neo Software	Kompart UK
Clyde's Adventure	1992	Moonlite Software	Moonlite Software
Clyde's Revenge	1995	Moonlite Software	Moonlite Software
Coaster	1993	Code To Go	Walt Disney Computer Software
Cobra Mission: Panic in Cobra City	1991	Inos	Megatech Software
Codename: ICEMAN	1990	Sierra On-Line	Sierra On-Line
Colonel's Bequest, The	1989	Sierra On-Line	Sierra On-Line
Colony 28	1997	5th Interactive	Napoleon Games
The Colony	1988	David Alan Smith	Mindscape
Comanche: Maximum Overkill	1992	NovaLogic	Softgold Computerspiele
Comanche: Global Challenge	1993	NovaLogic	Softgold Computerspiele
Comanche: Over the Edge	1993	NovaLogic	NovaLogic
Comanche CD	1994	NovaLogic	NovaLogic
Comanche 2	1995	NovaLogic	NovaLogic
Comanche 3	1997	NovaLogic	NovaLogic
Combat Air Patrol	1995	Psygnosis, Maverick Simulation	Psygnosis
Command & Conquer	1995-09	Westwood Studios	Virgin Interactive
Command & Conquer: Red Alert	1996-11-22	Westwood Studios	Virgin Interactive
Command HQ	1990	Ozark Softscape	Microplay Software
Commander Blood	1994	Cryo Interactive	Microfolie's, Mindscape
Commander Keen - Invasion of the Vorticons	1990-12-14	id Software	Apogee Software
Commander Keen - Goodbye, Galaxy!	1991-12-15	id Software	Apogee Software
Commander Keen - Aliens Ate My Babysitter!	1991	id Software	FormGen
Commando	1987	Quicksilver Software	Data East
Companions of Xanth	1993	Legend Entertainment	Legend Entertainment
Complete Onside Soccer	1996	Telstar Electronic Studios	Telstar Electronic Studios
Computer Edition of Risk, The - The World Conquest Game	1989	Virgin Mastertronic	Virgin Interactive
Computer Edition of Scrabble Brand Crossword Game, The	1988	Leisure Games	Virgin Interactive
Conflict: Europe	1989	Personal Software Services	Personal Software Services
Conflict: Middle East	1990	David J Eastman	Virgin Interactive
Congo Bongo	1984	Sega	Sega
Conquered Kingdoms	1992	Quantum Quality Productions	Quantum Quality Productions
Conqueror	1990	Rainbow Arts	Rainbow Arts
Conqueror A.D. 1086	1995	Software Sorcery	Sierra On-Line
Conquests of Camelot: The Search for the Grail	1990	Sierra On-Line	Sierra On-Line
Conquest Earth	1997	Data Design Interactive	Eidos Interactive
Conquests of the Longbow: The Legend of Robin Hood	1991	Sierra On-Line	Sierra On-Line
Conquest of the New World	1996	Quicksilver Software	Interplay Entertainment
Cosmic Crusader	1982	Michael Abrash	Funtastic
Constructor	1997	System 3 Software	Acclaim Entertainment
Contra	1988	Banana Development Corporation	Konami
Cool Croc Twins	1992	Arcade Masters	Empire Interactive
Cool Spot	1994	Virgin Interactive	Virgin Interactive
Cool World	1992	Twilight Software	Ocean Software
Corncob Deluxe	1992	Pie in the Sky Software	Pie in the Sky Software
Corporation	1991	Core Design, Dementia Productions	Virgin Games
Corridor 7: Alien Invasion	1994	Capstone Software	Intracorp, GameTek
Corruption	1988	Magnetic Scrolls	Rainbird Software
Cosmo's Cosmic Adventure: Forbidden Planet	1992	Todd Replogle	Apogee Software
Countdown	1990	Access Software	Access Software
Countdown to Doom	1987	Topologika	Topologika
Counter Action	1997	NashiIgry Llc.	Mindscape
Cover Girl Strip Poker	1991	Emotional Pictures	Emotional Pictures
Covert Action	1990	MicroProse	MicroProse
Crazy Cars III	1993	Titus Interactive	Titus Interactive
Creature Shock	1994	Argonaut Games	Virgin Interactive
Creepers	1992	Destiny Software Productions	Psygnosis
Cricket 96	1996	Beam Software	Electronic Arts
Cricket 97	1997	Beam Software	Electronic Arts
Crime and Punishment	1984	Mindscape	Mindscape
Crime Patrol	1994	American Laser Games	American Laser Games
Crisis in the Kremlin	1991	Spectrum Holobyte	Spectrum Holobyte
Crossfire	1983	Jay Sullivan	Sierra On-Line
Cruise for a Corpse	1991	Delphine Software International	Erbe Software, Interplay Entertainment, U.S. Gold
Crusade in Europe	1985	MicroProse	MicroProse
Crusader: No Remorse	1995	Origin Systems	Origin Systems
Crusader: No Regret	1996	Origin Systems	Origin Systems
Crush, Crumble and Chomp!	1983	Epyx	Epyx
Crystal Caves	1991	Apogee Software	Apogee Software
The Crystal Maze	1994	Digital Jellyfish Design	Sherston Software
Crystals of Arborea	1991	Silmarils	Silmarils
Cube	1991	Doug Cox	
Curse of Enchantia	1992	Core Design	Core Design
Curse of the Azure Bonds	1989	Strategic Simulations	Strategic Simulations
Curses	1993	Graham Nelson	
Cutthroats	1984	Infocom	Infocom
Cyberball	1990	Atari	Domark
Cyber Empires	1992	Silicon Knights	Strategic Simulations
Cybergenic Ranger: Secret of the Seventh Planet	1990	Symtus	Symtus
Cyberia	1994	Xatrix Entertainment	Interplay Entertainment
Cyberia 2: Resurrection	1995	Xatrix Entertainment	Virgin Interactive
CyberJudas	1994	D.C. True	Empire Interactive
CyberMage: Darklight Awakening	1995	Origin Systems	Electronic Arts
CyberRace	1993	Cyberdreams	Cyberdreams
CyberStrike	1994	Simutronics Corporation	MicroProse
Cyberwar	1994	SCi	Interplay Entertainment
Cyclemania	1994	Compro Games	Accolade
Cycles - International Grand Prix Racing	1989	Accolade	Accolade
CyClones	1994	Raven Software	Strategic Simulations
