= Chessmaster 4000 Turbo =

1993 video game

The Chessmaster 4000 Turbo
- Cover art featuring Will Hare
- Developer: The Software Toolworks
- Publishers: NA: The Software Toolworks; EU: Mindscape
- Series: Chessmaster
- Platforms: Windows, Mac OS
- Release: 1993
- Genre: Strategy
- Modes: Single-player, multiplayer

The Chessmaster 4000 Turbo (Note: also known as The Chessmaster 4000) is a 1993 chess video game developed and published by The Software Toolworks. It is part of the Chessmaster series. An enhanced CD-ROM version was released in 1994.

== Gameplay ==
The game supports SVGA graphics and the player can choose between 2D and 3D game view. Multiplayer supports modem and LAN play. Tournaments can be set up for up to eight players.

== Reception ==
Reception

Review scores
Publication	Score
Génération 4	88%
Joystick	85% 82% (CD-ROM)
Tilt	91%
Electronic Entertainment	10/10
Mikrobitti	93/100
PC Joker	77%
PC Player	82/100

The Chessmaster 4000 Turbo received universally positive reviews. Computer Gaming World compared the game to Kasparov's Gambit and said that Chessmaster 4000 has a less accurate rating system but better game analysis system and opponents have more variety in playstyle. The game was called a solid, flexible, and easy-to-use chess program. Mikrobitti said it is "more in-depth chess program than its predecessors, suitable for all skill levels." Génération 4 called the game "an indispensable purchase". Electronic Entertainment wrote: "Stunning visuals, extensive artificial personalities, remarkable playing strength, and excellent natural language advice—you get it all in Chessmaster 4000 Turbo." PC Joker said that compared to Chessmaster 3000 the playing strength is only slightly improved, and it does not quite reach the level of Mephisto Genius 2.0 or Mephisto Gideon but should still be enough for most players. In a 1995 comparison between 11 chess programs, Computer Gaming World rated Chessmaster 4000 the second highest after a pre-release version of Chessmaster 5000.
