= Virtua Chess =

1995 video game

- Developer: Titus France SA
- Publisher: Titus France SA
- Designers: Marc-François Baudot; Jean-Christophe Weill
- Platforms: MS-DOS, Windows
- Release: 1995
- Genre: Computer chess
- Modes: Single-player, multiplayer

Virtua Chess (also known as Virtual Chess) is a 1995 chess video game developed and published by Titus France SA for the MS-DOS. It was later ported to Windows. Two sequels were released: Virtual Chess 2 for the Windows in 1997 and Virtual Chess 64 for the Nintendo 64 in 1998.

== Gameplay ==
The 3D graphics were modeled using a Silicon Graphics computer. The interface can be customised by having up to nine windows simultaneously on the screen, the 2D and 3D boards can be viewed at the same time. The 3D view can be rotated and zoomed in and out of. A 386SX is require to run the game. Virtua Chess supports multiplayer via IPX and Saitek's magnetic PC Auto Chessboard.

== Development ==
In 1989, when Jean-Christophe Weill was studying for a DEA degree in artificial intelligence, he began programming the chess engine, which would be the basis for Virtua Chess. He decided to register for a chess engine tournament with another programmer, Marc-François Baudot. The engine finished second to last but drew against Mephisto, one of the stronger engines of the time. According to Weill, the poor result was due to bugs, in particular one involving the en passant rule. Following that, the engine continued to evolve with constant tweaks. It gets entirely rewritten in assembly language, whereas previous versions had parts in C. During a tournament, they met Eric Caen from Titus and got signed up to do a commercial program with Titus handling the graphics and sound. In January 1995, a beta version of Virtua Chess participated in a European chess engine tournament. It was ranked 36th out of 796 participants. Virtua Chess' Elo rating was estimated at 2300.

== Reception ==
Reception

Review scores
Publication	Score
Computer Gaming World	C
Joystick	90%
PC Gamer (US)	86%
Génération 4	80% (DOS); 4/6 (Win)
PC Joker	56%
PC Team	85%
Power Play	66%

PC Gamer criticized the game for lacking a tutorial but concluded that "[...] the strong gameplay and smooth interface does position Virtua Chess within striking distance of the elite chess sims." Joystick called Virtua Chess the best program of its kind. They liked the multi-windowing, 3D board view and "the many levels of play that are perfectly suited to beginners". The game was criticized for not supporting multiplayer via null modem. Génération 4 liked the interface and the number of game options but called the graphics and sound "austere". The game was said to be not friendly to beginners due to lack of tutorials and the difficulty of the AI. The Windows version was said to have an improved interface. Computer Gaming World said Kasparov's Gambit's has a better interface and Chessmaster 4000 and 5000 have the stronger opponents. The game was called "strictly bargain-bin material". PC Joker said the interface is awkward to use.

== Sequels ==
A sequel, Virtual Chess 2, was released in 1997 for the Windows. Génération 4 gave a positive review, praising the wealth of game options and help systems. PC Player gave a more negative review, they liked the level of playing strength and the tutorial but disliked the interface and the overall presentation.

Another sequel was released in 1998: Virtual Chess 64 for the Nintendo 64. It features animated chess pieces similar to Battle Chess. The game received mixed reviews from critics.
