= Chessmaster 7000 =

1999 video game

- Cover art with Will Hare
- Developer: Mindscape
- Publisher: Mindscape
- Series: Chessmaster
- Platform: Windows
- Release: 1999
- Genre: Computer chess
- Modes: Single-player, multiplayer

Chessmaster 7000 is a 1999 chess video game developed and published by Mindscape for the Windows. It is part of the Chessmaster series.

== Gameplay ==
Chessmaster 7000 has a new interface. The game's features are organized into "rooms". The Classroom has quizzes and tutorials with audio game commentary from Josh Waitzkin. In the Game Room or Tournament Room, you can play against personalities. The Game Room offers options like coaching modes and watching the computer's thought process. The Tournament Room has single rated games and tournaments with no hints or other help features allowed, and games affect your rating. New to Chessmaster 7000 is the Kid's Room that has features tailored to children like chess sets, tutorials, and personalities. The game's database includes over 500,000 matches, 200,000 more than Chessmaster 6000. The chess engine, King, is the same as the one in Chessmaster 6000. Network multiplayer options are LAN, modem, and TCP/IP. Internet play, Chessmaster Live, is through MPlayer.com service.

== Reception ==
Reception

Aggregate score
| Aggregator | Score |
|---|---|
| GameRankings | 82% |

Review scores
| Publication | Score |
|---|---|
| Computer Games Magazine | 4/5 |
| GameSpot | 8.1/10 (US); 8/10 (UK) |
| IGN | 8.1/10 |
| PC Gamer (US) | 78% |
| PC Games (DE) | 75% |
| PC Action | 91% |
| PC Joker | 80% |
| PC Player (DE) | 80% |

Chessmaster 7000 received generally positive reviews from critics. The game was said to be mostly a minor upgrade from the previous title. GameSpot thought the new interface was worse than in Chessmaster 6000. In conclusion it was said that "If you already have Chessmaster 6000 and don't have a kid who wants to learn the intricate game of chess using dinosaur pieces, I can't really recommend spending money for what's little more than a cosmetic overhaul to an already classic product." GameSpot UK said that "If you're a big fan of Chessmaster 6000 then this new game, despite having more to it, may seem to be just a fussy reworking of an already great game." and "[...] you may even find that you prefer Chessmaster 6000's interface to this update." IGN was very impressed with the game: "What makes this game different is the degree to which you can customize the play options. But when stacked up against a title with the same flexibility, it's the usefulness of CM7000 as a reference tool that brings the most value to the game." Computer Games Magazine commented: "If you already own Chessmaster 6000, there's not a lot new here unless you have children who would enjoy the Kid's Room. In fact, the new interface leaves less room on the screen for the board and windows. If you're an accomplished chess player looking for serious tournament preparation software, something like Fritz 6 may be more appropriate." PC Action gave a positive review and said the only drawback was that the game is only in English. PC Joker said Fritz is the stronger chess program and recommended Chessmaster 7000 for more casual players.
