= Ancient Evil =

- Developer: Silver Lightning Software
- Publisher: Silver Lightning Software
- Platform: Windows
- Release: 1998
- Genres: Adventure; Role-Playing

Ancient Evil is a 1998 video game developed and published by Silver Lightning Software. It was one of several games developed by Silver Lightning, the others being Rally Challenge.

== Gameplay ==
Ancient Evil is a dungeon challenge in which adventurers enter the Crypt of the Ancients, a vast underground complex overseen by the arch‑mage Alaric, who built it thousands of years ago as a burial site for the demigod Ancients. Participants descend into the Crypt seeking the reward of 50,000 gold coins offered to anyone who survives the ordeal and returns to tell their story, though only Alaric and the hero Jetraal have ever emerged alive. Jetraal, believed dead for three centuries, has now reappeared as a ghost to warn of impending danger tied to Alaric's actions, setting the stage for the player's journey into the Crypt to uncover what threatens the world.

== Development ==
Ancient Evil was developed in 12 months by Perth, Australia-based studio Silver Lightning Software. It was distributed in Australia and South East Asia by Roadshow Entertainment.

== Reception ==
Reception

Review scores
Publication	Score
GameStar	65%
PC PowerPlay	72%
Power Play	50%
PC Joker	58%
PC Player	53%
PC Games	62%

PC PowerPlay liked the graphics and animations in Ancient Evil.
