= Chessmaster =

- Genre: Computer chess
- Developers: David Kittinger; Kathe Spracklen; Dan Spracklen; Johan de Köning
- Publishers: The Software Toolworks (1986–1994); Mindscape (1993–1999); Mattel Interactive (2000); Ubisoft (2001–2008); Feral Interactive (OS X)
- Platform: List: Apple II, Atari 8-bit, Commodore 64, DOS, Amiga, Atari ST, Amstrad CPC, ZX Spectrum, MSX, Mac, Game Boy, Game Boy Color, Game Boy Advance, Game Gear, NES, Super NES, Windows, PlayStation, PlayStation 2, PlayStation Portable, Nintendo DS, Android, BlackBerry, Windows Mobile, Xbox, Xbox 360
- Original release: 1986–2008

Chessmaster (originally The Chessmaster) is a chess video game series, currently owned and developed by Ubisoft. It is the best-selling chess video game series, with more than five million units sold. The same cover art image featuring Will Hare was used from Chessmaster 2000 to Chessmaster 9000.

== Timeline ==
Chessmaster 10th Edition

- 1986: The Chessmaster 2000. First published by Software Country, and soon after by The Software Toolworks. It was published for Amiga, Apple II, Atari 8-bit computers, Atari ST, ZX Spectrum, Commodore 64, Amstrad CPC, MSX, Mac, and MS-DOS. The game had a chess engine (without mouse control) written by David Kittinger and the manufacturer rated the game at 2000 Elo. USCF rated it over 2000; in reality, it is unknown at what strength it plays because the testings were done on slow 1980s computers. In July 1986, CM became the first commercially available software to win the Personal Computer class of the United States Open Computer Chess Championship in Mobile, Alabama.
- 1988: The Fidelity Chessmaster 2100 was published for Apple II/Apple IIGS and Commodore 64. In 1989 for MS-DOS and in 1990 for Amiga.
- 1990: The Chessmaster was published for NES, in 1991 for Game Gear and Game Boy and in 1992 for Super NES and Genesis.
- 1991: The Chessmaster 3000 was published for DOS, Windows 3.x and Mac. Moves are now explained with voice output.
- 1993: The Chessmaster 4000 Turbo, first published by Mindscape for Windows 3.x and Mac. Modem and LAN play was available for the first time. A CD-ROM version was released in 1994.
- 1996: The Chessmaster 3-D for PlayStation (uses the Chessmaster 4000 engine).
- 1996: Chessmaster 5000 for Windows 95.
- 1997: Chessmaster 5500 for Windows 95.
- 1998: Chessmaster 6000 for Windows 95/Windows 98 and Mac.
- 1999: Chessmaster II was published for PlayStation.
- 1999: Chessmaster 7000 was published for Windows 98
- 1999: Chessmaster for Game Boy Color
- 2000: Chessmaster 8000 was published for Windows 98. In addition to the English version, a Russian translation was created.
- 2002: Chessmaster 9000, first published by Ubisoft for Windows 98/ME/XP and in 2004 for Mac OS X. Compared to the previous title, a French translation was added.
- 2002: Chessmaster for Game Boy Advance
- 2002: Chessmaster for Palm OS.
- 2003: Chessmaster for PlayStation 2.
- 2004: Chessmaster, the mobile Java version was published. In 2007 released also for Android, BlackBerry and Windows Mobile.
- 2004: Chessmaster 10th Edition was published for Windows XP and Xbox. The Xbox version is titled Chessmaster.
- 2005: Chessmaster Challenge, a simplified version of the game was published for Windows as a downloadable game by PlayFirst.
- 2007: Chessmaster: Grandmaster Edition (also Chessmaster 11: Grandmaster Edition) was released for Windows XP/Vista. Portable version for Nintendo DS and PlayStation Portable is known as Chessmaster: The Art of Learning. It includes numerous tutorials by International Master Joshua Waitzkin and Grandmaster Larry Christiansen for players of all skill levels, 900 most important chess games in history, 190 personalities of opponents, children puzzles with Raving Rabbids and other minigames. A Polish translation has been added.
- 2008: Chessmaster Live for Xbox 360.

== Chess engine ==
The Chessmaster chess engine is called The King, written by Johan de Koning of the Netherlands and introduced in the Chessmaster 4000 Turbo. It became the Chessmaster engine until the present, while the last engine version The King 3.50 was incorporated in the Chessmaster 11.

The first edition Chessmaster 2000 featured a chess engine written by David Kittinger, who went on to develop the engines for Interplay's USCF Chess, WChess for the German company Millennium 2000, and Sierra Entertainment's Power Chess, Majestic Chess and Disney's Aladdin Chess Adventures. The second edition Chessmaster 2100 had an engine designed by Kate and Dan Spracklen of Sargon family chess programs.

According to the September 2009 Swedish Chess Computer Association (SSDF) rating list, Chessmaster 9000 had an estimated Elo rating of 2718 on an Athlon-1200 PC. If multiple versions of other engines are stripped out of this list, Chessmaster 9000 ranked 14th among all engines tested. As of May 2008, Chessmaster 9000 remained the most recent version rated by the SSDF.

The latest version, Chessmaster 11, was released in 2007, and has lagged behind more current chess engines. CCRL placed it 121st on its August 2020 list (15th among engines only available via purchase).

The King engine allows users to create new playing styles, called "personalities", by manipulating several dozen different settings, such as King Safety, Pawn Weakness, Randomness, Mobility and others. Individual piece values can also be adjusted. Chessmaster 9000, for example, features over 150 different personalities ranging from International Grandmaster strength down to Stanley, a chimpanzee who, in most situations, plays completely random moves. The Stanley chimpanzee personality inspired the Stanley Random Chess Variant.

=== Branding ===
The Chessmaster 2000 developers aimed to anthropomorphize the game's chess engine with a mascot character to give players the feeling of a human opponent. The "Chessmaster" character on the game's packaging and title screens was a photo of actor Will Hare costumed to look like "a person, a wizard, a chessmaster!" rather than a "black box" The image became iconic, and the original photo remained part of the series' branding for 17 years.

=== Notable games ===
- Larry Christiansen vs. Chessmaster 9000 (September 2002), annotated at GameKnot: Game 1, Game 2, Game 3, Game 4

Chessmaster won the four-game match against Christiansen held in September 2002, by a score of 2½–1½. The Chessmaster program was operated by John Merlino, the Project Manager of Chessmaster at the time of the match. Four different personalities were used in the match, the first three of which were based on famous human Grandmasters: Alexander Alekhine, Bobby Fischer, and Mikhail Botvinnik. The final game of the match used the default "Chessmaster" personality. Christiansen won the first game, lost the second and third games, and the fourth game resulted in a draw.

== Platforms ==
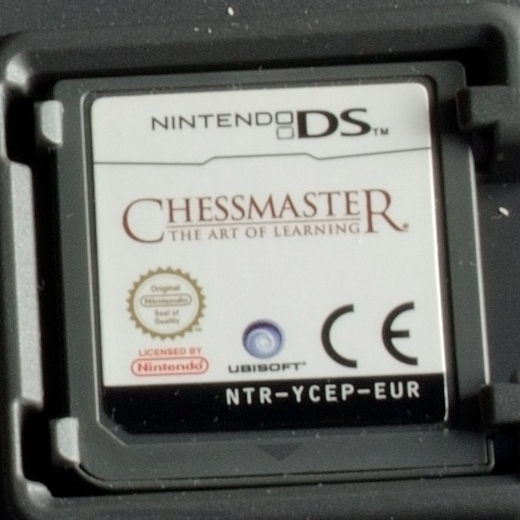
Cartridge Chessmaster: The Art of Learning for Nintendo DS

To date, various versions of Chessmaster have appeared on Amiga, Apple II, Apple IIGS, Atari 8-bit, Atari ST, Amstrad CPC, ZX Spectrum, MSX, Commodore 64, IBM compatibles, Macintosh, Nintendo Entertainment System, Super NES, Game Boy, Game Boy Color, Game Boy Advance, Nintendo DS, Genesis (as a Sega Channel exclusive), Game Gear, PlayStation, PlayStation 2, Xbox, and mobile phones.

Early Mac versions Chessmaster 3000 and 4000 were developed by Sebastian Rapport and Troy Heere that leveraged the Kittinger and de Koning engines respectively. Later Mac versions were ported by Feral Interactive, and the latest Mac version available is Chessmaster 9000. Ubisoft also offers a downloadable version of the game, Chessmaster Challenge, which differs from Chessmaster 10th Edition in its simplified interface and scaled-down tutorials.

The more recent editions of Chessmaster include both 2D and 3D designs, and a large number of different boards and themed chess piece designs. The interface was revised for Chessmaster 10th Edition and features animated 3D sets in which the pieces "walk" between squares and have simulated battles when a piece is taken, reminiscent of Battle Chess or the Wizard's chess set from Harry Potter. Chessmaster 10th Edition also comes packed with a pair of red and blue glasses to view the set in "enhanced 3D".

An Xbox Live Arcade version with Xbox Live multiplayer and Xbox Live Vision camera support for the Xbox 360 called Chessmaster Live was released on 30 January 2008, but is no longer available.

== Reception ==
The combined sales of the Chessmaster series had reached 1 million copies by September 1996. The series surpassed 5 million units in sales by 2002, making it the highest-selling computer chess series ever at the time.

In 1989, Computer Gaming World found Chessmaster 2100's features "the clear winners" over Sargon 4, in 1992 reported that Chessmaster 3000 had added "a lot" to its predecessors, with new tutorial features and a variety of computer opponents making the game "a truly impressive sequel", and in 1994 approved of Chessmaster 4000 Turbo's new AI "personalities" based on historical chess players. 4000 Turbo received a perfect 10 out of 10 score from Electronic Entertainment.

In Japan, Famitsu magazine scored the 1991 Super Famicom version of the game a 23 out of 40, and the 1994 Game Boy version a 21 out of 40.

Critical reaction to the Chessmaster series has been mostly positive. GameSpot commented that "Chessmaster has remained the consummate standard in console chess games since the '80s." IGN said that "the series itself remains the best way to play and learn about chess on the PC."

Chessmaster: Grandmaster Edition scored positive reviews, with PC Gamer saying: "this one-stop shop for an entire chess-playing and learning family should last until you're all grandmasters." Chessmaster 10th Edition holds an 84% rating on review aggregator site GameRankings. IGN gave Chessmaster 10th Edition a score of 8.4/10, calling it "the best chess game in town." GameSpot's review of Chessmaster 10th Edition said, "If you're looking for a good chess program that's packed with a plethora of features and all the bells and whistles, you'll be very happy with Chessmaster 10th Edition.

The mobile phone version of Chessmaster received a score of 9/10 from IGN, who called it "an absolutely superlative product that will be enjoyed for week after week by fans of the mental contest." IGN criticized the Nintendo DS version of Chessmaster: The Art of Learning for its lack of multiplayer, but gave it an overall positive review, with a score of 7.8/10. IGN criticized the "boring" presentation of the PlayStation Portable version of Chessmaster: The Art of Learning, but added that "there's no doubt that the information is valuable and can teach you the finer points of the game."

Although the Chessmaster engine is generally not as strong as the engines of other commercially available chess programs such as Fritz, critics have praised the Chessmaster series for its comprehensive tutorials aimed at players of amateur and moderate skill levels. In its review of Chessmaster 9000, IGN said that "the series has always distinguished itself with first-rate chess teaching tools", and welcomed the game's "appeal towards inexperienced and mid-level players. With all manner of tutorials, detailed analysis and exercises, the game helps ease newbies into the experience." GameSpot's review of Chessmaster 10th Edition commented positively on the game's "huge bundle of features aimed at everyone from the neophyte who's looking to learn the basics to the advanced wood pusher who may need practice for tournament play."

A common criticism of the series has been the lack of new features in successive installments. IGN's review of Chessmaster 10th Edition commented, "it simply doesn't add enough over any of the last two versions to make it a necessary upgrade."

=== Awards ===
The editors of Computer Games Strategy Plus named Chessmaster Online the best online game of 1997.

In 1994, PC Gamer UK named Chessmaster 4000 Turbo the 20th best computer game of all time, calling it the best of the series so far and accessible to all skill levels. The editors wrote, "A chess game? In the Top 50? Well, why not?" In June 1994 Chessmaster 4000 was a finalist for Computer Gaming World's Strategy Game of the Year award, losing to Master of Orion The editors wrote that "Software Toolworks still has the capacity and the will to improve their best-selling chess engine".

In 1997 Chessmaster 5000 was a finalist for Computer Gaming World's Classic/Puzzle Game of the Year award, losing to Baku Baku Animal.

== See also ==
- Computer chess
- List of chess software
