= Don Dailey =

American researcher and game programmer

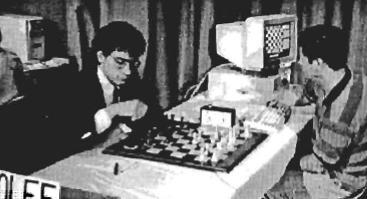
- Dailey (right) in 1992
- Born: March 10, 1956; Kalamazoo, Michigan, U.S.
- Died: November 22, 2013 (aged 57); Roanoke, Virginia, U.S.
- Occupation: Game programmer

Don Dailey (March 10, 1956 – November 22, 2013) was an American researcher in computer chess and a game programmer. (Note: Not to be confused with Alabama journalist Don Dailey who hosted Capitol Journal on Alabama Public Television for 24 years.) Along with collaborator Larry Kaufman, he was the author of the chess engine Komodo. Dailey started chess programming in the 1980s, and was the author and co-author of multiple commercial as well as academic chess programs.

== Chess programs ==
=== Rex ===
Rex was Dailey's first chess program in the 1980s, in collaboration with Sam Sloan and Larry Kaufman. It competed at various ACM North American Computer Chess Championships and World Computer Chess Championships. Rex was improved further and marketed as RexChess.

=== Heuristic software ===
In the early 1990s, Dailey started to work with chess master and computer chess programmer Julio Kaplan within his company Heuristic Software. The program they developed was called Heuristic Alpha, which later evolved into Socrates, Socrates II and the mass market entry Kasparov's Gambit.

=== MIT connection ===
At the ACM 1993 computer chess tournament, which was won by Dailey's program Socrates II on an IBM PC ahead of Cray Blitz, he met Bradley Kuszmaul and Charles Leiserson from MIT competing with StarTech, and they asked him to help develop a new parallel chess program. Some time later when Heuristic went out of business, he began working part-time for Leiserson at the lab at MIT on the new parallel program Star Socrates, beside his duty as official systems administrator. Star Socrates played a strong World Computer Chess Championship 1995 in Shatin, Hong Kong, finally losing the playoff versus Fritz. Dailey continued his cooperation with Charles Leiserson on the massively parallel chess program Cilkchess, written in Cilk.

=== Corel and Mini ===
Additionally, in the 1990s, Dailey further worked with Larry Kaufman on the commercial mass market entry Corel Chess. Beside competing with CilkChess, their serial chess program Mini played the World Computer Chess Championship 1999 in Paderborn.

=== Doch and Komodo ===
After a break from computer chess and a few years focusing on other domains, Dailey developed the 2009/2010 chess program Doch and its successor Komodo, which were again joint efforts with Larry Kaufman. In Fall 2013, the developmental version of Komodo won stage 3, and already after Don's death, the final of the Thoresen Chess Engines Competition, the latter in a 48-game match versus stage 4 winner Stockfish by a margin of 25–23. Finalist Stockfish DD, dedicated to Don Dailey, was officially released during the final, the commercial Komodo-TCEC a few days later.

== Personal life ==
Dailey was an active poster in computer chess forums and computer Go newsgroups. He was raised as a Jehovah's Witness and served in recent years as an elder in the church of Roanoke.

=== Death ===
In October 2013, Dailey announced the release of Komodo 6, but also news concerning the future status of Komodo due to his fatal illness of an acute form of leukemia, and introduced Mark Lefler as new member of the Komodo team. Dailey died of leukemia at the age of 57 on November 22, 2013.
