= Chessmaster 6000 =

1998 video game

- Cover art featuring Will Hare
- Developer: Mindscape
- Publishers: Mindscape; Mattel Interactive (Mac)
- Series: Chessmaster
- Platforms: Windows, Classic Mac OS
- Release: 1998 (Win); 2000 (Mac)
- Genre: Computer chess
- Modes: Single-player, multiplayer

Chessmaster 6000 is a 1998 chess video game developed and published by Mindscape for the Windows operating system. It is part of the Chessmaster series. The Classic Mac OS port was published by Mattel Interactive in 2000.

== Gameplay ==
The game's database includes over 300,000 matches. Chessmaster 6000 expands the tutorials from previous game, adding more topics. All the tutorials feature voice commentary. International Master Joshua Waitzkin, voice-annotates 14 chess matches. For computer opponents, there are 64 "personalities" that simulate a human opponent by having a biography, photo, rating, and playing style. By playing against computer opponents, players are rated similarly to real-life tournament chess. Other features include the natural-language advice option, which analyzes the position and suggests moves; auto-annotate, which builds an analysis of a game or position; Opening Book, a database coach that identifies openings and demonstrates how the game can proceed. The internet multiplayer component, Chessmaster Live, is again included but was done this time through MPlayer.com service instead of Mindscape's own servers. Internet play is not included in the Macintosh version.

== Reception ==
Reception

Review scores
Publication	Score
Computer Games Strategy Plus	3.5/5
GameSpot	8.6/10
Joystick	80%
Macworld	3.5/5
Génération 4	4/6
PC Gaming World	8/10
PC Player (DE)	71%

PC Gaming World said: "Mindscape has produced an extremely confident new version of its flagship chess title. Visually polished and feature-wise comprehensive. Very nice." GameSpot recommended Chessmaster 6000 slightly over Sierra's Power Chess. Major criticism was the long waiting times on the MPlayer service. Computer Games Strategy Plus concluded: "if you don't plan to use the tutorials, this is a great chess program for the mainstream player. If you plan on using Chessmaster 6000 to learn to play, you may want to wait to see if Mindscape fixes the tutorial errors." Joystick recommended Titus Interactive's Virtua Chess over Chessmaster 6000. Macworld summarized: "If you're looking for a fun way to learn the game or for a tough sparring partner, Chessmaster 6000 is a wonderful tool. If you want heavy analysis of moves and strategies, you won't find it here."
