= Chessmaster Live =

2008 video game

- Developer: Ubisoft Sofia
- Publisher: Ubisoft
- Series: Chessmaster
- Platform: Xbox 360 (XBLA)
- Release: January 30, 2008
- Genre: Computer chess
- Modes: Single-player, multiplayer

Chessmaster Live is a 2008 chess video game developed and published by Ubisoft for the Xbox 360, on the Xbox Live Arcade service. It is the final game in the Chessmaster series, released just three months after The Art of Learning. The game was announced on November 28, 2007. Chessmaster Live was historically the name used for the multiplayer mode in the series starting with Chessmaster 5500.

== Gameplay ==
Chessmaster Live is based on the 2003 Chessmaster game for the PlayStation 2. The game replaces Josh Waitzkin's tutorials with a generic scaled down practice mode. Also the library of historic games and classic opening moves have been cut compared to the PC games. The single player features over 100 AI "personalities." New to the game is the message chess system where players swap moves via the in-game message service, similar to a play-by-mail game. The game features puzzle modes like "find the fork" or "mate in one." Four multiplayer modes return from The Art of Learning: "dark chess", "losing chess", "progressive chess", and "extinction chess". Multiplayer can be played either locally or on Xbox Live. The board view can be either in 2D or in true 3D. The game supports the Xbox Live Vision webcam and allows to save replays of matches. In April 2008, a chess set based on Rayman Raving Rabbids was released as downloadable content. Chessmaster Live has since been removed from Xbox Live Arcade.

== Reception ==
Reception

Aggregate score
Aggregator	Score
Metacritic	76%

Review scores
Publication	Score
1Up.com	B+
Eurogamer	8/10
GamesRadar+	8/10
IGN	6.4/10
Official Xbox Magazine (UK)	7.0/10
Official Xbox Magazine (US)	8.5/10
TeamXbox	8.0/10

Chessmaster Live received generally positive reviews from critics. GamesRadar+ said: "Chessmaster Live doesn't look like much. But it delivers exactly what it promises, and there's not really much to complain about because of it." Eurogamer concluded: "[...] this is about as solid a Chess package as one could hope for on the service." IGN said "[...] the feature set doesn't quite live up to the rest of the series". 1UP.com said the game has "[...] nearly everything you'd want in a competitive simulator while including all the necessary tools for engrossing offline and online matches". TeamXbox called it "a solid enough game to impress most players, even if the Xbox Live Arcade market was flooded with chess titles." Official Xbox Magazine UK said the game is "a graphically functional, perfectly playable plug-in for those who want a quick game of chess." Official Xbox Magazine US gave a positive review but criticized the coach system or the fact that AI can't play any of the chess variants.
