= Chess Simulator =

1990 video game

- Developer: Oxford Softworks
- Publisher: Infogrames
- Platforms: Amiga, Atari ST, MS-DOS
- Release: 1990
- Genre: Computer chess
- Modes: Single-player, multiplayer

Chess Simulator is a 1990 chess video game developed by Oxfordshire-based Oxford Softworks and published by Infogrames for the Amiga, Atari ST, and MS-DOS. Oxford Softworks' previous chess program, Chess Champion 2175, was released only a few months before Chess Simulator. Chess Simulator is part of Infogrames' Simulator series, which includes Dames Simulator, Bridge Simulator, Billiards Simulator, and an unreleased Pinballs Simulator.

== Gameplay ==
The board can be viewed in 2D or 3D perspective. The game includes a mode where the player's Elo rating is determined after solving 24 chess puzzles. Other modes include a supervisor mode, where a two-player match is supervised by the computer. The DOS version features EGA graphics.

== Reception ==
Reception

Review scores
Publication	Score
Aktueller Software Markt	48/50 (DOS)
Amiga Action	60%
Joystick	86% (Amiga); 83% (DOS)
ST Action	59%
ST Format	62%
Tilt	18/20 (Amiga, ST); 17/20 (DOS)
Datormagazin	7/10 (Amiga)
Pelit	85/100 (Amiga)

Datormagazin said the game is almost identical to Chess Champion 2175. The only added feature in Chess Simulator was a voice synthesized opponent but the voice was noted as "irritating". Chess Champion 2175 was said to have a better manual and the ability to move pieces more smoothly during play. Aktueller Software Markt said it's "a strong representative of its kind, which is difficult to fool". Joystick said that if you like chess and don't already have a chess program, Chess Simulator is a game that you should absolutely own. Tilt said the game is identical to Chess Player 2150 except it's in French and the chess pieces have been redesigned beautifully. In summary, it was said to be the best chess program alongside Chess Champion 2175. ST Action said "This Chess game doesn't offer anything that we haven't seen before and even the special features aren't especially different in comparison with others." ST Format pitted the game against Colossus Chess X and it was determined to be equal to it. In conclusion, the program was said to be easy to use, solid, fast, and powerful but lacks originality. Pelit said the game is almost identical to Chess Champion 2175, noting that Chess Champion is more user friendly. Chessmaster 2100 was recommended over either game.
