= Big job =

Big job may refer to:

- One last big job, a movie cliché in which a team of criminals are gathered together for a final caper that will make their fortunes.
- Big Job, a slang term for feces or defecation.
- Any job that is big.
- The Big Job (film), a 1965 British crime comedy film.
- Big Job (video game)
