= Genesia =

Genesia might refer to:

- An Ancient Greek festival of the dead
- An expert system developed by Électricité de France in the 1980s
- The European title of Ultimate Domain, a 1992 computer game from Microïds
- Genesia, a planet from the Star Wars expanded universe
- Genesia, a planet from Buck Rogers in the 25th Century (TV series).
