= Magic Boy (video game) =

1993 video game

- Super NES cover art
- Developer: Blue Turtle
- Publishers: Empire Interactive; JVC Musical Industries (SNES)
- Designer: John Dale
- Composer: John Dale
- Platforms: Amiga, Atari ST, MS-DOS, Super NES
- Release: Amiga: EU: 1993; SNES: NA: August 1996; EU: 1996
- Genre: Platform
- Mode: Single-player

Magic Boy is a platform game developed by Blue Turtle and published for the Amiga, Atari ST, and MS-DOS by Empire Interactive in 1993. A Super Nintendo Entertainment System version was published in 1996 in North America and Europe by JVC Musical Industries.

For the Amiga and Atari ST, Magic Boy was bundled with a bonus game Cool Croc Twins.

== Plot ==
Hewlett, a wizard's apprentice, has accidentally caused havoc which he must undo. Hewlett was working late one night and accidentally tripped over a hidden trapdoor and released his master's collection of crazy animals out of the basement. Hewlett's goal is to correct his mistakes by capturing and imprisoning the monsters/crazy animals and returning everything to normal.

=== Super NES ===
The Super NES has a different plot on the back of the box, but it does not affect the game itself. Hewlett accidentally added mercury to a potion despite his master telling him to use parsley. The result is that his master is turned into an elephant and every creature in a 100-mile radius turned into a monster.

== Gameplay ==
Magic Boy is a 2D platform game taking place over 4 worlds; Sand Land, Wet World, Plastic Place and Future World. Each of these worlds feature 8 levels, bringing the total standard levels to 32. The game also features another 32 bonus levels, bringing the total to 64. The first four levels of any world can be completed in any order, which unlocks levels 5 to 8 for that world. The levels themselves are vertically scrolling.

The player starts with 3 lives and 3 continues. Touching an enemy that is not stunned will result in a lost life, as does falling into water or onto spikes. However simply walking over spikes does not harm Hewlett.

Hewlett is armed with a magic wand that he can use to stun enemies. Once stunned he can pick them up by walking into them, and then by pressing the "down button" they are sent back to the basement which is represented in the information panel/icon by two rows of initially empty rooms that fill once you drop the enemies down. This capturing mechanic is the main goal of the game and a requirement to complete each level, but there is also a points/score system. When a creature is captured, a bonus is released. There are also blocks with exclamation marks that once destroyed release a bonus. When collected these bonuses reward the player with points.

Laurie Yates stated in Electronic Games magazine that the background music is upbeat and of a Caribbean styling reminiscent of calypso.

=== Objects and obstacles ===
In addition to enemies, spikes, exclamation mark boxes and water there are other platforming objects and obstacles to help or hinder Hewlett. Springs act as trampolines when jumped on and pistons automatically move up and down allowing the player to reach otherwise unreachable areas. Trap squares have one of three outcomes - red ball traps result in a lost life, big spikes allow Hewlett to shoot monsters he couldn't normally reach, or the previously mentioned spikes that kill when jumped on but can be safely walked on. There are also ice blocks that speed up Hewlett and enable him to make longer jumps, blue dissolving squares disappear once stood on, and sticky squares slow Hewlett down and prevent him from jumping.

=== Power-ups and collectables ===
Various power-ups are available throughout the game including extra lives and continues. Once an enemy is captured and sent to the basement, the bonus it drops can be one of several items: points to add to your score, new abilities such as shooting through walls, shooting up, or down, double shots and triple shots. "E-X-T-R-A" letters are scattered around levels and collecting them all rewards the player with an extra life. There are also level warps, which send the player to a random level and the magic book which reveals hidden rooms.

== Reception ==
Reception

Aggregate score
Aggregator	Score
GameRankings	58.80%(SNES)

ST Format gave the Atari ST version a rating of 84%

PC Zone Magazine gave the MS-DOS version a 60/100, stating that it was "Not very 'magic' at all"

Amiga Game Zone magazine gave the Amiga version a "B" rating

Electronic Games magazine gave the SNES version 80%
