= Chessmaster 8000 =

2000 video game

- Cover art featuring Will Hare
- Developer: Mattel Interactive
- Publisher: Mattel Interactive
- Series: Chessmaster
- Platform: Windows
- Release: November 14, 2000
- Genre: Computer chess
- Modes: Single-player, multiplayer

Chessmaster 8000 is a 2000 chess video game developed and published by Mattel Interactive for the Windows. It is part of the Chessmaster series.

== Gameplay ==
Chessmaster 8000 runs on a new chess engine. It is compatible with any publicly available XBoard engine which can be imported to the game to customize the engine. A new interface change is the addition of Natural Language. It gives verbal cues and text instructions when for example making an illegal move. Josh Waitzkin returns to the game and narrates a new endgame course. Bruce Pandolfini designed a new feature for the game called Match the Masters where the game asks a multiple choice question to predict a move in a historic Grandmaster game. The graphics have been upgraded to 16-bit color. The game's tutorials and database have been updated and expanded, and new personalities added to the game. Network multiplayer options are LAN, modem, and TCP/IP. Internet play, Chessmaster Live, is through MPlayer.com service. Matchmaking was removed from internet play.

== Reception ==
Reception

Aggregate score
| Aggregator | Score |
|---|---|
| Metacritic | 80% |

Review scores
| Publication | Score |
|---|---|
| AllGame | 4/5 |
| Computer Games Magazine | 3/5 |
| GameSpot | 7.4/10 |
| IGN | 8.4/10 |
| PC Gamer (US) | 78% |
| PC Games (DE) | 87% |
| Gry-Online | 80% |
| PC Action | 91% |
| PC Player (DE) | 80% |
| Level | 71% |

Chessmaster 8000 received an aggregated score of 80 out of 100 on Metacritic based on 11 reviews, indicating "generally favorable reviews". GameSpot said the internet play is worse than in previous installments. They concluded that "[i]f you're looking to improve your chess game, Chessmaster 8000 is hands-down the best choice out there. But once you sharpen your skills, you'll probably wind up turning to some other outlet for competing with human players." IGN said: "I loved the last game and I love this one. But if you've already got the last game, the few additions you get in 8000 might not be worth it." Computer Games Magazine summarized: "[...] overall you get the feeling that the game was rushed to market. It's still the best mass market chess game you can buy at your local software shop, but with a few bugs squashed and the fuller featured online features of last years' version revived, it could be a much better program." AllGame concluded: "Due to its incredible content and easy interface, the game is one of the best of its kind on the market for both casual and professional players." Gry-Online gave a positive review but recommended to those with a limited budget the free Crafty, or to those who are more serious Fritz 6 supplemented with ChessBase 8.0.
