= Chessmaster 9000 =

2002 video game

- Cover art with Will Hare
- Developers: Ubi Soft; Zonic (Mac)
- Publishers: Ubi Soft; Feral Interactive (Mac)
- Series: Chessmaster
- Platforms: Windows, Mac OS X
- Release: NA: August 27, 2002 (Win); EU: November 2002 (Win); NA/EU: 2004 (Mac)
- Genre: Computer chess
- Modes: Single-player, multiplayer

Chessmaster 9000 is a 2002 chess video game developed and published by Ubi Soft for the Windows. It is part of the Chessmaster series. The game was announced on July 12, 2002. Grandmaster Larry Christiansen played four matches against the game in September 2002. He won the first match, lost the next two, and match four was a draw.

== Gameplay ==
The game comes with a downloadable endgame database generator that uses a proprietary database format, called FEG (Final Endgame Generator). The series on the PC features for the first time true 3D boards that can be rotated and zoomed in and out. Over 60 chess sets and boards have been added to the game. Josh Waitzkin returns with a new eight-part course, "The Psychology of Competition". There's several new tutorials: "follow the game", "memorize the position", a "blunder alert" feature, and an endgame quiz authored by Grandmaster Larry Evans. It consists of 50 endgame positions where the player is asked to provide the next best move for a given side by a multiple-choice question. Other new features added are blindfold chess, hidden opponents and random opponent. Network multiplayer is either through the internet or LAN. The internet play, Chessmaster Live, is using ubi.com instead of MPlayer.com.

== Reception ==
Reception

Aggregate score
Aggregator	Score
GameRankings	80%

Review scores
Publication	Score
Computer Gaming World	3.5/5
GameSpot	7.6/10
GameSpy	4.5/5
GameZone	8.0/10
IGN	8.2/10
Jeuxvideo.com	16/20
Joystick	8/10
Macworld	4.5/5
PC Gamer (US)	78%
Level	80%

Chessmaster 9000 received generally positive reviews from critics. GameSpot said that "no other product delivers the ease of use and instructional value of Chessmaster 9000." IGN concluded: "In short, if you've got 8000 and can do without the in-game multiplayer modes, then you can just as easily do without 9000. If you don't own 8000 and have a love for chess, there's no reason not to own the latest version of the greatest series." GameSpy said that "[...] Chessmaster 9000 is the perfect product for new players and veterans alike." Computer Gaming World called the game "[a] powerful learning tool for sure, but the AI's lack of subtlety is geared more toward the already-accomplished player." Macworld called it "the best chess game you can buy for the Mac".
