= Julio Kaplan =

Argentine-American chess player

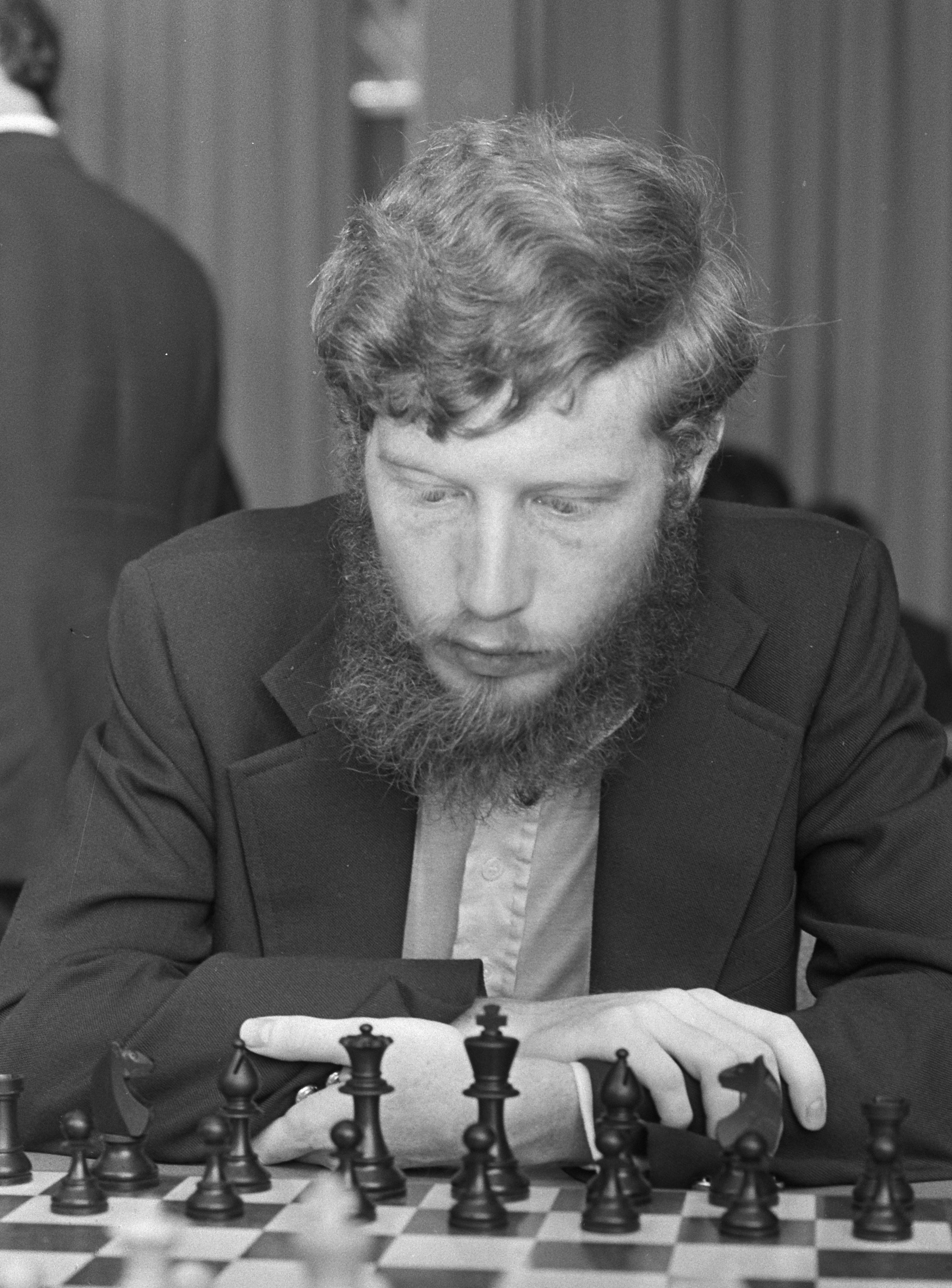
- Kaplan in 1974

Personal information
- Born: 25 July 1950 (age 76) Buenos Aires, Argentina

Chess career
- Country: Puerto Rico (before 1976); United States (after 1976)
- Title: International Master (1967)
- FIDE rating: 2480 (November 2026)
- Peak rating: 2480 (January 1981)

Julio Argentino Kaplan Pera (born 25 July 1950 in Argentina) is an Argentine-born chess player, former world junior chess champion, as well as a software developer and founder of Heuristic Software.

Born in Argentina, he emigrated in 1964 to Puerto Rico, where he was raised and studied. Later in his life, he emigrated to the United States, where he resides to this day and works for Autodesk. Earlier in his career, in the 1980s, he programmed dedicated chess computers for SciSys and Saitek. In the early 1990s he collaborated on the chess program Socrates.

== Chessplayer ==
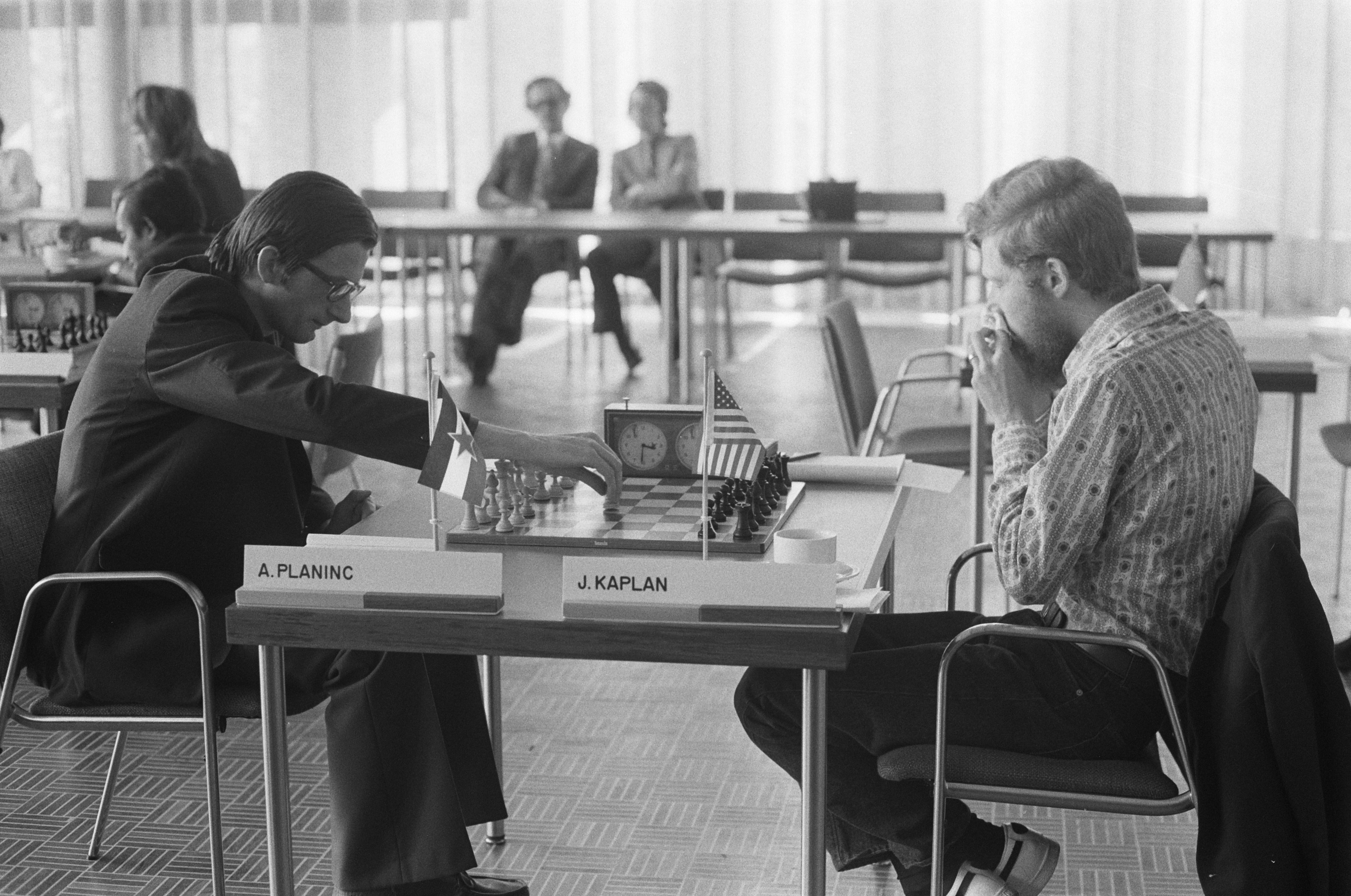
Albin Planinc playing Kaplan (right), 18 July 1974

Kaplan was born in Argentina. His first memory of chess was when his older brother gifted him a book, My System by Aron Nimzovich, at the age of 9. In 1964, when he was 13, his family moved to Puerto Rico. Chess was less popular in Puerto Rico than Argentina, and Kaplan remembered getting oppotunies to participate in many small-scale competitions like the 1966 Student Olympiad and the 1966 Havana World Olympiad. His chess coach was Jacobo Bolbochán.

In 1967, he was the Puerto Rico National Chess Champion and, in addition, he won the World Junior Chess Championship in Jerusalem, followed by the well-known Raymond Keene, Jan Timman, Robert Hübner, among others. This victory earned Kaplan the International Master title. In the same year, he was admitted to the University of Berkeley, and Kaplan began to play chess less and focus on computer science more.

In 1968, he tied for 6–9th in Málaga. In 1969, he took 4th in Stockholm (World Junior Championship, Anatoly Karpov won). In 1969, he tied for 8–9th in San Juan (Boris Spassky won). In 1970, he won the 6th El Segundo Open, the 6th Monterey International Open, and the 2nd Central California Championship, held in Hayward. In 1971, he won the 22nd Annual California Open, held in Fresno. In 1973, he took 8th in São Paulo (Ostojic won). In 1973, he tied for 12–14th in Madrid (Karpov won). In 1974, he tied for 2nd–3rd with Florin Gheorghiu, behind Svetozar Gligorić, in Los Angeles.

Kaplan played for the Puerto Rico National Chess Team in four Chess Olympiads.

- In 1966, at second reserve board in 17th Olympiad in Havana (+6 –4 =4)
- In 1968, at first board in 18th Chess Olympiad in Lugano (+1 –1 =4)
- In 1970, at first board in 19th Chess Olympiad in Siegen (+5 –1 =7)
- In 1972, at first board in 20th Chess Olympiad in Skopje (+7 –1 =9).

He played for the Puerto Rico National Chess Team (1966, 1971) and for the USA (1976) in the World Student Team Chess Championships.

- In 1966, at third board in 13th WSTCC in Örebro (+7 –1 =3)
- In 1971, at first board in 18th WSTCC in Mayagüez (+4 –2 =6)
- In 1976, at first board in 21st WSTCC in Caracas (+3 –0 =5).

He won the individual gold medal at Örebro 1966, and the team silver medal at Caracas 1976.

Kaplan said that his technique was to memorize Rubinstein's and Lasker's games and take notes on their strategies.

== Software developer ==
Kaplan had always been interested in computer chess throughout his career, and this led him to found Heuristic Software Corporation, whose first development was Heuristic Alpha in 1990–91, which eventually evolved into Socrates and later Socrates II.

Socrates II was one of the corporation's most successful programs, winning the 1993 ACM International Chess Championship after defeating opponents with special-purposed hardware and software for playing chess, like HiTech and Cray Blitz, even though Socrates II ran on a stock 486 PC.

These achievements drew Electronic Arts's attention, and the company proceeded to hire Kaplan's development team to develop Kasparov's Gambit, incorporating former world chess champion Garry Kasparov as brand name and adviser. Kasparov's Gambit was the first and sole effort of Electronic Arts to enter the chess market.

== See also ==
- List of Puerto Ricans
- Kasparov's Gambit
- List of Jewish chess players
