= Kasparov's Gambit =

1993 video game

- Developer: Heuristic Software
- Publisher: Electronic Arts
- Engine: Socrates II
- Platform: MS-DOS
- Release: NA: November 1993
- Genre: Chess
- Mode: Single player

Kasparov's Gambit, or simply Gambit, is a chess playing computer program created by Heuristic Software and published by Electronic Arts in 1993 based on Socrates II, the only winner of the North American Computer Chess Championship running on a common microcomputer. It was designed for MS-DOS while Garry Kasparov reigned as world champion, whose involvement and support was its key allure. A Macintosh version was planned to be released in 1995.

== History ==
Julio Kaplan, chessplayer, computer programmer, and owner of the company Heuristic Software, first developed Heuristic Alpha in 1990–91. The original version evolved into Socrates with the help of other chess players and programmers including Larry Kaufman and Don Dailey, who, later, were also developers of Kasparov's Gambit.

Improvements to Socrates were reflected in a version called Titan, renamed for competition as Socrates II, the most successful of the series winning the 1993 ACM International Chess Championship. During the course of the championship, Socrates II, which was running on a stock 486 PC, defeated opponents with purpose-built hardware and software for playing chess, including HiTech and Cray Blitz.

Electronic Arts purchased Socrates II and hired its creators to build a new product, Kasparov's Gambit, including Kasparov as consultant and brand. It was the company's effort to enter the chess programs market, dominated at the time by Chessmaster 3000 and Blitz. In 1993 it went on sale, but contained a number of bugs, so was patched at the end of that year. The patched version ran at about 75% of the speed of Socrates II which was quite an achievement considering the whole functionality of the software was sharing the same computer resources.

In 1993, it competed in the Harvard Cup (six humans versus six programs), facing grandmasters who had ratings ranging from 2515 to 2625 Elo. It finished the competition in 12th and last place. Grandmasters took the first five places and another Socrates derivation – Socrates Exp – was the best program finishing in 6th place.

According to team developer Eric Schiller, a Windows version was planned by Electronic Arts, but was never finished. Electronic Arts had earlier produced the chess variant Archon: The Light and the Dark (1983), and later followed up with Battle Chess II: Chinese Chess (2002) and Jamdat Mobile's Kasparov Chessmate (2003).

== Reception ==
Computer Gaming World in 1993 approved of Kasparov's Gambit's "stunning" SVGA graphics, Socrates II engine, and coaching features, concluding that it was "above any PC game on the market". It was a runner-up for the magazine's Strategy Game of the Year award in June 1994, losing to Master of Orion. The editors called Kasparov's Gambit "beautifully crafted", a "great teacher" and "a chess game for the 'rest of us.'" It holds the 145th place in Computer Gaming World's 1996 list of 150 Best Games of All Time.

== Features ==
Gambit was intended to have the capabilities of a champion level software and a teaching tool for a wide range of player levels. It was Electronic Arts' first use of windowed video showing digitized images, video and voice of champ Garry Kasparov giving advice and commenting on player moves.

Primary features include:

- Interactive tutorial with video-help by Garry Kasparov
- An inline glossary of chess terms
- A library of 500 famous games played by past world champions
- An auxiliary graphical chessboard showing the computer's analysis while playing or reviewing moves
- An interactive move list
- An analysis text box, showing move's elapsed time, depth, score of the best evaluated line and number of positions seek
- Multiple computer playing styles allowing creation and customization of computer opponents
- A coach window including the moves played and comments about openings and advice, sometimes showing videos of Kasparov

=== Rating ===
The human strength rating is calculated using Elo formula with the included personalities and the player's own performance, going from 800 to 2800 points. New players get a customizable 800 Elo, which changes according to the total number of games played, opponents' relative strength, and game results.

Creation of personalities enables five adjustable characteristics in percentage (0-100%) – strength, orthodoxy, creativity, focus and aggressiveness – which define, besides its style, its Elo rating. User Elo is calculated according to Gambit's universe of electronic players and the user, and so do not match rankings in the real world. Instead this feature was designed to provide a useful way to measure the player's strength and progress against Gambit.

=== Teaching tools ===
Besides 125 tutorials, written by renowned chess author and developer Eric Schiller, classified in openings, middle game, endgames (checkmates), tactics and strategy also include a Famous Games database, a list of all-time world champions games commented by Kasparov with a quiz option where user must choose the next move.

== Technical information ==
It was designed for 386SX IBM AT compatible systems. Even when it was possible to read commands from a keyboard or mouse, the use of a mouse was recommended. When it was released, Kasparov's Gambit offered a nice look & feel experience using SVGA mode with a 640x480 resolution, 256 colors, and voice/video recordings of world champion Garry Kasparov. A lack of sound card support was reported by users.

It is playable on DOSBox since version 0.61 on Linux and other Unix-like operating systems, Windows XP and subsequent versions, and Mac OS X.

=== Development ===
First intention was using Heuristic Alpha as Gambit's base, but unexpected good performance of Socrates II in tournaments made of it the final choice. According to developer and tester Larry Kauffman "first released included important bugs, that Knowledge of bishop mobility appears to be missing, as does some other chess knowledge, and Gambit appears to run only about 50-60% of the speed of the ACM program in positions (without bishops) where the two do play and evaluate identically. There are also bugs in the features and the time controls, and the program is rather difficult to use (perhaps because it has so many features). One good thing I can say is that the 3d graphics are superb... I have tested the patched version, and have confirmed that most or all of the bugs have been corrected. The new version does play identically to the ACM program and runs at 70-75% of the speed, so it should rate just 30 points below the ACM program."

Socrates II engine was fully programmed in assembly language, but rewritten just in C language for Kasparov's Gambit engine. Instead, assembly language was used for sound and video capabilities, as for other functionalities.

== See also ==
- Computer chess
- List of Electronic Arts games
