= 20th Century Video Almanac =

- Developer: The Software Toolworks
- Release: 1993
- Operating system: Classic Mac OS; MS-DOS; Windows

20th Century Video Almanac is a software CD-ROM developed by The Software Toolworks. The CD-ROM contains thousands of front-page articles and videos documenting the tumultuous events of the 20th Century.

== Development ==
20th Century Video Almanac was developed with a budget of $500,000.

== Reception ==
CNET said "If you want to experience the world events that have shaped this century--from Marilyn Monroe's mysterious death to the modern-day plight of Somalian refugees--you won't find a better guide than 20th Century Video Almanac".

Computer Gaming World called it an excellent reference for kids and parents alike and fun to boot.

CD-ROM Today said "20th Century Video Almanac: Best of the Century is an excellent vehicle to pique the historical interest of young and old alike".
