= Chessmaster: Grandmaster Edition =

2007 video game

- Developers: Ubisoft Bucharest (Win); Ubisoft Sofia (DS, PSP)
- Publisher: Ubisoft
- Series: Chessmaster
- Platforms: Windows, Nintendo DS, PlayStation Portable
- Release: October 23, 2007 (DS); October 30, 2007 (Win); February 15, 2008 (PSP)
- Genre: Computer chess
- Modes: Single-player, multiplayer

Chessmaster: Grandmaster Edition (portable version as Chessmaster: The Art of Learning, alternatively Chessmaster 11: Grandmaster Edition) is a chess video game developed and published by Ubisoft for the Windows, Nintendo DS and PlayStation Portable. It is part of the Chessmaster series. The game was announced in August 2007 and released in October 2007.

== Gameplay ==
The game is narrated and contains detailed tutorials suitable for beginners and advanced users by Josh Waitzkin, using principles from his book The Art of Learning. The game uses an updated version of the King chess engine. The game database includes 600,000 matches and 190 personalities of computer opponents. The PSP version supports Wi−Fi multiplayer. It also offers 3D animated chess sets, including children's Raving Rabbids set.

The game includes six minigames: "fork my fruit" where the goal is to fork two fruits using any of the given pieces, "masterpiece" where the objective is to paint a picture by making as few moves as possible, "breaking the lines" where the aim is to capture pawns using only knights and "chain reaction" where the target is to link three or more pieces by placing them within opponent's attack range, "pawn charge" where the goal is to reach the eighth rank without being captured, and "minefield" where the objective is to defeat an invisible enemy. Multiplayer modes include "progressive chess", where opponents gain moves each turn, "dark chess" in which opponent's pieces are invisible unless under attack, "losing chess" where the objective is to lose pieces, and "extinction chess" which replaces checkmate with the win condition of capturing all of opponent's pieces.

The portable version Chessmaster: The Art of Learning contains fewer tutorials and lacks, for example, a strategy chapter, classic grandmaster games, or an offensive chapter by Larry Christansen. The DS version supports multi-card wireless play but doesn't support Wi-Fi. The PC network multiplayer is either via the internet or LAN.

== Reception ==
Reception

Review scores
Publication	Score
GamesRadar+	5/10 (PC); 6/10 (PSP)
GameZone	7.8/10 (DS)
IGN	7.8/10 (DS); 6.6/10 (PSP)
Jeuxvideo.com	16/20 (PC)
PALGN	7.0/10 (DS)
PC Gamer (US)	85% (PC)
Pocket Gamer	3.5/5 (PSP)
Game	78% (DS)
576 Konzol	8/10 (DS); 6/10 (PSP)
Strana Igr	7.0/10 (PC)

=== Windows ===
Jeuxvideo.com concluded that "Chessmaster undoubtedly remains the reference title for the general public. [...] A completely dispensable purchase, however, if one already has the tenth edition. PC Gamer and Jeuxvideo.com said that the online lounges were deserted. Strana Igr said the game is not too different from the previous one. GamesRadar+ summarized: "Even though most gameplay and options tend to be predictably consistent, The Art of Learning is a great tool for skill building and is put together in a simple easy to use package with something to offer everyone."

=== Nintendo DS and PSP ===
IGN reviewed the DS version and said: "The only thing missing is Wi-Fi multiplayer. [...] for anyone who remotely enjoys chess, this is the definitive handheld release." Later they reviewed the PSP version and concluded: "There are a lot of modes and games to get into [...]. However, the presentation is completely phoned-in and will make you wonder why the hell this budget-looking title is priced at $30. GameZone said "the presentation sucks" in the DS version but still called it a great game for chess fans. Pocket Gamer criticized the tuition tools in the PSP version as inadequate for intermediate players. They summarized the game as a "perfect place to start" for new players. Game said the DS version is "a title suitable for everyone, young and old".
