= Cribbage King / Gin King =

1989 video game

- Publisher: The Software Toolworks
- Platforms: Amiga, Apple IIGS, MS-DOS, Mac
- Release: 1989

Cribbage King / Gin King is a 1989 video game published by The Software Toolworks.

== Gameplay ==
Cribbage King / Gin King is a game in which the customizable card game package can be played using either a keyboard or mouse.

== Reception ==
Michael S. Lasky reviewed the game for Computer Gaming World, and stated that "Cribbage King is well worth its price. To have Gin King also included makes it a decided computer game bargain for any card shark."
