= Virtual Chess 64 =

1998 video game

- Developer: Titus France
- Publisher: Titus France
- Platform: Nintendo 64
- Release: NA: June 10, 1998; EU: July 1998
- Genre: Chess
- Modes: Single player; multiplayer

Virtual Chess 64 is a chess simulation game for the Nintendo 64. It was released in 1998. It is the third and final game in the Virtual Chess series. The game features no true "completion" in the form of a goal or a score, so one could theoretically play an endless number of matches. When a piece is captured, a short animated cutscene plays back depicting the battle, as in 1988's Battle Chess.

== Features ==
Virtual Chess 64 comes with a basic text and visual tutorial written for beginners and novices about how to play chess. In the third section the tutorial continues explaining how to play using simple chess positions in which the player must find the best move. The fourth section is an analysis of "Fool's mate" and "Scholar's mate". In the fifth and sixth sections these chess problems become increasingly complicated, and the player is expected to find the solution and understand it. The seventh section is about basic endgame checkmating approaches and patterns, and just one basic endgame concept for beginners: the square of the promoting pawn. The last three sections focus on improving opening, middlegame, and endgame chess play by using example games for analysis.

A full game can be played using either a 2D or 3D board. There is a "Rotate Board" option for the 2D and 3D boards, although the C-left and C-right buttons can be used to rotate the 3D board by a greater variety of angle measures. On the 3D board every time a piece is captured is accompanied by a short cutscene depicting the capture unless this is disabled or limited to one-time only per piece capture combination. There are no cutscenes on the 2D board for captures. Players can change the design of the pieces and board and use the "flash think" and last move square lights. There are four 2D chess sets to select from. Players can create scenarios by adding or removing pieces from the board and placing them in different positions, but there is a bug removing the option to castle in games customized through this feature. The game supports two players, and also the option of seeing the chess engine play itself.

The game also has a "Level" option in which players can set the time taken for the chess engine to respond based on the complexity of the position. Time is the only real factor behind the quality of the engine's moves, and while the default difficulty level results in analysis in a matter of seconds, the "Level 12" setting results in waiting times greatly varying based on the position. There is a "Meditation" setting by which, if enabled, the chess engine will think on the player's time except usually during the opening phase of the game in which predefined moves are played. Again based on the complexity of the position, analysis will continue for a matter of hours or days until either a forced checkmate is found or the player makes a move.

== Development ==
Development on the game started as early as June 1997.

== Critical reaction ==
Reception

Aggregate score
Aggregator	Score
GameRankings	64%

Review scores
Publication	Score
AllGame	3.5/5
Consoles +	84%
Computer and Video Games	1/5
Electronic Gaming Monthly	6.25/10 (Note: Four critics of Electronic Gaming Monthly gave the game each a score of 6.5/10, 7/10, 5.5/10, and 6/10.)
Game Informer	3/10
GamePro	2/5 (Note: GamePro gave the game 4/5 for graphics, two 2/5 scores for sound and overall fun factor, and 3/5 for control.)
GameSpot	6.1/10
Hyper	79%
IGN	7.7/10
N64 Magazine	76%
Next Generation	3/5
Nintendo Power	5.4/10

The game received mixed reviews according to the review aggregation website GameRankings. Nintendo Power gave it a mixed review, a few months before the game was released Stateside.

Critics stated that although Virtual Chess 64 may not be for those who aren't into chess, it was so thorough in features and gameplay that it was worthwhile to any kind of chess player, including newcomers wanting to get into the game. The game's opponent AI was praised, with critics claiming it to be hard to beat even on lower difficulty levels. Hyper and N64 Magazine opined that it made Virtual Chess a worthy alternative to playing chess in real life with another human. The tutorial feature was also frequently praised for its interactive nature.

The 3D chess board garnered numerous complaints. Crispin Boyer was disoriented by its "awkward perspectives", and Josh Smith and Scott Alan Marriott noted the 3D pieces were difficult to identify which Marriott attributed to their "carved" look. The 3D camera controls were panned as limited, as the player could only rotate in 360 degrees and in one direction. Reviewers also suggested the game should've had a higher amount of 3D boards. Particular condemnation was given to the chess-piece-clearing animations, described as annoying, poorly-made gimmicks that were repetitive and quickly lost their appeal.
