= Beyond the Black Hole (video game) =

1989 video game

- Developer: The Software Toolworks
- Publishers: The Software Toolworks; Hi Tech Expressions (NES)
- Composer: Peter Stone
- Platforms: MS-DOS, Commodore 64, Commodore 128, Nintendo Entertainment System
- Release: 1989: MS-DOS, C64/128; October 1990: NES
- Mode: Single-player

Beyond the Black Hole is a computer game developed by The Software Toolworks and published in 1989 for the Commodore 64, Commodore 128, and MS-DOS, as well as for the Nintendo Entertainment System in 1990 under the name Orb-3D.

== Plot ==
Beyond the Black Hole is a game where the player is a scientific officer placed in charge of investigating some unusual phenomena. The player uses cartography orbs to examine objects in space, with two rebound fields on the left and right edges of the screen to reflect the orb back to the middle. The player must dive from orbit into the objects and gain points by hitting them with the orb. The player must keep the orb fueled by maneuvering it through the fueling pods into the service center, and avoid pirates who want to steal the fuel.

== Gameplay ==
Beyond the Black Hole is stereoscopic 3-D arcade game which comes with 3-D glasses. The player is able to use the keyboard, a joystick, or a mouse to move around in space. The game is playable without the glasses, as the game uses motion, not color, to generate the 3-D effect.

== Reception ==
Beyond the Black Hole was reviewed in 1989 in Dragon #152 by Hartley, Patricia, and Kirk Lesser in "The Role of Computers" column. The reviewers gave the game 5 out of 5 stars. Compute! was less positive, stating that the game "is heavy on packaging and special effects and light on gameplay". The magazine hoped that "a more substantial game" would use the "impressive 3-D effect".
