= Chess Player 2150 =

1989 video game

- Developer: Oxford Softworks
- Publisher: Oxford Softworks
- Designer: Chris Whittington
- Platforms: Amiga, Atari ST, MS-DOS
- Release: EU: 1989
- Genre: Computer chess
- Modes: Single-player, multiplayer

Chess Player 2150 is a 1989 chess video game by Oxfordshire-based Oxford Softworks released for the Amiga, Atari ST, and MS-DOS. A successor, Chess Champion 2175, was released in 1990.

== Gameplay ==
The board can be viewed in 2D or 3D perspective. The game includes a mode where the player's Elo rating is determined after solving 24 chess puzzles. The DOS version features CGA and EGA graphics.

== Reception ==
Reception

Review scores
Publication	Score
Aktueller Software Markt	46/50 (Amiga); 45/50 (DOS)
The Games Machine (Italy)	82% (Amiga); 80% (DOS)
Tilt	19/20 (ST)
Amiga Joker	63%
Atari ST User	9/10

Aktueller Software Markt pitted the game against Sargon III and found that Chess Player won four out of six games. In conclusion, the game was "absolutely recommended for chess fans". Amiga Joker said that in terms of playing strength, Chess Player is stronger than Chessmaster 2000 and Colossus Chess X, and equal to Chessmaster 2100. The Italian Games Machine called it a very powerful program worthy of consideration, with the one flaw of not being very fast. Svenska Hemdatornytt gave a negative review for the Amiga version and said the program is not as strong as advertised. Atari ST User said that "The program seems to be able to calculate much deeper in the time given than its rivals." The 3D view was said to be better than in Chessmaster 2000 or Colossus Chess X. Tilt pitted the game against Chessmaster 2000, Chessmaster 2100, and Colossus Chess X. Chess Player 2150 was the strongest of the four.
