= Bruce M. Fischer =

American actor (1936–2018)

Bruce Fischer
- Born: Bruce M. Fischer; March 20, 1936; Greensboro, North Carolina, U.S.
- Died: April 11, 2018 (aged 82)
- Other name: "Bear"
- Occupation: Actor
- Years active: 1971–2014
- Spouse: Jane Fischer

Bruce M. "Bear" Fischer (March 20, 1936 – April 11, 2018) was an American actor, best known for playing prisoner and rapist Wolf Grace in the 1979 film Escape from Alcatraz. He also played a rapist in Clint Eastwood's The Outlaw Josey Wales (1976), and Mr. Cooger in the film Something Wicked This Way Comes (1983). His other film credits include The Journey of Natty Gann (1985) and Grim Prairie Tales (1990) as an undead gunman. He also had several guest roles playing villains on The Dukes of Hazzard.

== Filmography ==
=== Film ===
| Year | Title | Role | Notes |
|---|---|---|---|
| 1971 | A Town Called Hell | Miguel | Uncredited |
| 1971 | Doc | Billy Clanton | |
| 1971 | Captain Apache | | |
| 1971 | Man in the Wilderness | Wiser | |
| 1973 | The Man Called Noon | Ranch hand | |
| 1974 | Earthquake | Man #1 | Uncredited |
| 1976 | The Outlaw Josey Wales | Yoke | |
| 1976 | Baker's Hawk | Blacksmith | |
| 1979 | Escape from Alcatraz | Wolf Grace | |
| 1981 | Back Roads | Ezra | |
| 1981 | Take This Job and Shove It | Jimmy | |
| 1982 | Flush | | |
| 1983 | Something Wicked This Way Comes | Mr. Cooger | |
| 1984 | City Heat | Bruiser #1 | |
| 1985 | The Journey of Natty Gann | Charlie Linfield | |
| 1987 | The Verne Miller Story | Harry Adler | |
| 1989 | Real Men | Steelworker | |
| 1990 | Grim Prairie Tales | Colochez | |
| 2009 | Everyman's War | Judge | |
| 2014 | Birds of LA 17 | Boris 'The Strangler' | |

=== Television ===
| Year | Title | Role | Notes |
|---|---|---|---|
| 1975 | Gunsmoke | The Man | "The Angry Land" |
| 1979 | The Dukes of Hazzard | Buck | "Gold Fever" |
| 1982 | The Dukes of Hazzard | Bull | "Hazzard Hustle" |
