= Chessmaster 10th Edition =

2004 video game

- Developer: Ubisoft Bucharest
- Publisher: Ubisoft
- Series: Chessmaster
- Platforms: Windows, Xbox
- Release: Windows: NA: August 10, 2004; EU: October 21, 2004; Xbox: NA: November 1, 2004
- Genre: Computer chess
- Modes: Single-player, multiplayer

Chessmaster 10th Edition is a 2004 chess video game developed and published by Ubisoft for the Windows and Xbox. It is part of the Chessmaster series. The Xbox version is titled simply Chessmaster. The PC version was announced on June 22, 2004 and the Xbox version on August 2, 2004.

== Gameplay ==
The game has a new version of the King chess engine. The number of AI "personalities" has been increased to 200 and the game database has been increased by 50,000 matches. The AI doesn't support resigning. Josh Waitzkin and Larry Christiansen provide tutorial and game commentary. The PC version supports stereoscopic 3D and the game box includes 3D glasses. 35 chess sets are included. Some of the sets have to be unlocked by winning a certain number of ranked games. Other new features include an online ranking system, a create-a-tournament mode, and a tutorial mode called Chessmaster Academy. Network multiplayer options are either the internet or LAN. The internet play, Chessmaster Live, is through ubi.com on the Windows and Xbox Live on the Xbox.

== Reception ==
Reception

Aggregate score
Aggregator	Score
Metacritic	81% (PC); 79% (Xbox)

Review scores
Publication	Score
1Up.com	8.0/10 (Xbox)
GameSpot	7.8/10 (PC); 8.1/10 (Xbox)
GameZone	8.5/10 (PC); 9.0/10 (Xbox)
IGN	8.4/10 (PC); 8.5/10 (Xbox)
Jeuxvideo.com	17/20 (PC)
PC Gamer (US)	80%
PC PowerPlay	79%
Level	8.6/10 (PC)

=== Windows ===
Chessmaster 10th Edition received generally positive reviews from critics. IGN said "[...] considering that you can still get Chessmaster 9000 for twenty bucks, I don't see much reason to go with this newest 10th edition if you're not a serious student of the game. Chessmaster 10th Edition was IGN's runner-up for game of the month in August 2004. GameSpot concluded: "The latest Chessmaster isn't the perfect program for hardcore chess aficionados. However, if you're looking for a good chess program that's packed with a plethora of features and all the bells and whistles, you'll be very happy with Chessmaster 10th Edition." Jeuxvideo.com said the biggest improvement from 9000 is the interface. PC Gamer summarized: "As complete a chess package as you could want, although it's missing a few friendly touches." Level called Chessmaster 10th Edition a well-designed game that appeals to both veteran and casual players. GameZone noted " If you're an ultra hard-core player, you can stick with a Fritz or Kasparov model, but for those of us that do not eat, breathe and sleep chess, this is an excellent game." PC PowerPlay said "[i]t’s easy to get into, pick up, then put down again for a few months."

=== Xbox ===
IGN said "Chessmaster is accessible to all skill levels." GameSpot echoed that "[i]t's perfect for beginners, intermediates, and experts alike". 1UP.com summarized: "Chessmaster offers a plethora of options, online play, and no innovation to a game that doesn't really need innovation [...]". GameZone called it "[a] top quality game that did not short the consumers or insult the seasoned players by dumping a low-end game for the sake of having a chess game for the Xbox."
