= Big Job (video game) =

1996 video game

- Platforms: Windows, Macintosh
- Release: 1995
- Genre: Educational

Big Job is a 1995 educational video game developed by American studio ImageBuilder Software and published by Discovery Channel Multimedia in 1995 for Windows and Macintosh. It is for ages 4 to 8.

== Gameplay ==
The player begins in the Clubhouse, where several activities and three driving adventures—Farming, Fire Rescue, and Construction—are available. Each adventure contains seven short movies and two interactive activities, and players can print trading cards and achievement certificates earned during play. Driving sections use a simple steering method in which the mouse is pointed left or right to guide the vehicle along the road. Beyond the driving adventures, the program includes additional activities such as music videos, a demolition‑derby style game, and construction‑themed tasks that allow the player to build a city, farm, or construction site, operate a wrecking ball, or design and assemble a truck. Throughout the program, a talking computer guide named CHIPP provides assistance when needed.

== Development ==
In June 1996, Zeta Multimedia partnered with Discovery Channel Multimedia to launch Big Job and other titles from the company for the Spanish and Latin American markets.

== Reception ==
Reception

Review score
Publication	Score
PC Joker	60%

PC Joker gave Big Job a score of 60%.
