= Grim Prairie Tales =

1990 film

- Promotional poster
- Directed by: Wayne Coe
- Written by: Wayne Coe
- Produced by: Richard Hahn
- Starring: James Earl Jones; Brad Dourif; Will Hare; Marc McClure; Michelle Joyner; William Atherton; Lisa Eichhorn
- Cinematography: Janusz Kamiński
- Edited by: Earl Ghaffari
- Music by: Steven Dancz
- Production companies: East-West Film Partners; Academy Entertainment
- Distributed by: Image Entertainment
- Release date: September 24, 1990
- Running time: 86 minutes
- Country: United States
- Language: English

Grim Prairie Tales is a 1990 American independent horror Western film, written and directed by Wayne Coe, and starring an ensemble cast including James Earl Jones, Brad Dourif, Will Hare, Marc McClure, William Atherton, and Lisa Eichhorn.

An anthology film composed of four separate stories, it is told by two travellers around a prairie campfire. Morrison (Jones) is a grizzled bounty hunter carrying a body, while Farley Deeds (Dourif) is a clerk on the way to a romantic reunion with his wife.

== Synopsis ==
The first story, told by Morrison, is about an Indian tribe's revenge against a grouchy old man (Will Hare) who desecrates their burial ground. When that tale fails to impress Deeds, the second story, also by Morrison, tells about a man (Marc McClure) who helps a seductive seemingly pregnant demon woman (Michelle Joyner) in trouble. Deeds, disgusted by the second story, responds with the only non-supernatural story of the three, about a homesteader family whose father (William Atherton) is forced to participate in a lynch mob. Finally, after feeling challenged by Deeds' story, Morrison tells about a gunslinger (Scott Paulin) haunted by a gunman (Bruce Fischer) he has killed in a shootout. The next morning, Deeds points out to Morrison that the body he's carrying doesn't match the description on the wanted poster; Morrison cuts the body loose and rides out.

== Cast ==
- James Earl Jones as Morrison
- Brad Dourif as Farley Deeds
- Will Hare as Lee
- Michelle Joyner as Jenny
- Marc McClure as Tom
- William Atherton as Arthur
- Lisa Eichhorn as Maureen
- Wendy J. Cooke as Eva
- Scott Paulin as Martin
- Tom Simcox as Horn
- Bruce M. Fischer as Colochez

== Production ==
The film was the sole directorial outing from Coe, a storyboard artist and set decorator. At one point, Coe was considering making a sequel entitled Grim Prairie Tales: Rescue Party. The film was the feature film debut of future Academy Award-winning cinematographer Janusz Kamiński, who at the time worked as a lighting technician and 2nd unit director under fellow DP Phedon Papamichael. Wally Pfister, another Academy Award-winning cinematographer, served as a grip.

== Reception ==
At the time of its cinema and subsequent video release it was marketed as a straight horror, and reviews of the time consequently focused on its lack of scares. Stephen Holden from New York Times wrote, "Grim Prairie Tales aspires to be a sort of western Twilight Zone, but the stories it tells are so flat and lacking in tension and atmosphere that the movie generates no tingles." Hal Hinson from Washington Post offered the film similar criticism, stating that the film wasn't particularly scary.

Coe stated that, even though the film was marketed as horror, it could also be interpreted as a feminist western due to its themes of sexism and female empowerment.
