= Capitol Hill (video game) =

1993 video game

- Windows cover art
- Developer(s): Amazing Media
- Publisher(s): The Software Toolworks
- Platform(s): Macintosh, Windows
- Release: 1993
- Genre(s): Educational
- Mode(s): Single-player

Capitol Hill is an educational game developed by American studio Amazing Media and published by The Software Toolworks in 1993 for Windows and Macintosh. The game lets the players be a representative from a US state and learn about the U.S. Congress by joining committees as well as meeting with foreign aides.
