= Socrates (chess) =

== Socrates ==
Socrates was a serial chess program developed by Don Dailey and Larry Kaufman at Heuristic Software. Socrates has played against such prominent grandmasters as David Bronstein, Walter Browne, and Boris Gulko.

== Socrates II ==
Socrates II was a chess program that, in 1993, won the 23rd North American Computer Chess Championship. It ran on a single IBM PC with an 80486 microprocessor running at 50 MHz. This was the first and only time that a stock microcomputer won this event, finishing ahead of past winners Cray Blitz and HiTech. The authors, Don Dailey and Larry Kaufman, renewed their collaboration twenty years later to create the Doch and Komodo chess engine.

=== *Socrates ===
Researchers at MIT later developed a parallel version, *Socrates (pronounced "Star-Socrates"), based on the original program. It used the Cilk 1.0 programming language to parallelize computation across multiple processors.

== See also ==
- Kasparov's Gambit
