= The San Diego Zoo Presents: The Animals! =

1992 video game

The San Diego Zoo Presents: The Animals
- PC Cover art
- Developer: Arnowitz Studios
- Publisher: The Software Toolworks
- Platforms: Windows, Macintosh, Sega CD, 3DO
- Release: November 1992 (Win, Mac); 1994 (Sega CD); 1994 (3DO)
- Genre: Educational
- Mode: Single-player

The San Diego Zoo Presents: The Animals (also known as "The Animals") is an educational game developed by the Software Toolworks and Arnowitz Studios and published by The Software Toolworks in 1992 for Windows. Arnowitz Studios developed the multimedia assets and The Software Toolworks did the software development. A release for 3DO was planned for release in November 1993 but was ultimately launched in 1994. The game was then ported to Sega CD in 1994.

== Gameplay ==
The game is divided into 5 different sections focusing on baby animals, animal facts, animal habitats, information on the San Diego Zoo itself and all about saving endangered animals from extinction. The content consists of several video clips, audio, photos and articles.

== Reception ==
=== Critical reception ===
Reception

Review scores
Publication	Score
Computer and Video Games	21% (Sega CD)
MacUser	5/5
Computer Shopper	100%

Awards
Publication	Award
New media	1993 Invision Award
Oppenheim Toy Portfolio	Gold Seal of Excellence
Summer CES	1993 Innovations Award
New York International Film Festival's Interactive Competition	1993 Best Educational Multimedia
Compute	1993 Choice Award
Family Fun	1993 Kids Choice Award

The School Library Journal praised the game for its variety and rich content in animals, ecosystems and preservation. The game was reviewed in the Oppenheim Toy Portfolio Guide Book where it was described as "a gorgeous program, a multimedia must-have. Comparable to a beautiful coffeetable book about animals and zoo life, but better!" Computer & Video Games gave the Sega CD version a bad review with a low score of 21% for its bad quality footage and lack of animal media.

=== Commercial performance ===
A year after its release, the game sold over 400,000 copies. The Windows version of the game was reviewed by Bill Gates as "a must get" at the 1993 CD Expo. The 3DO version of the game was showcased at the Winter Consumer Electronics Show in Las Vegas around early January 1994.
