= Larry Kaufman =

American chess grandmaster and shogi player (born 1947)

Personal information
- Born: Lawrence Charles Kaufman; November 15, 1947 (age 78)

Chess career
- Country: United States
- Title: Grandmaster (2008)
- FIDE rating: 2196 (June 2024)
- Peak rating: 2424 (July 2001)

Lawrence “Larry” Charles Kaufman (born November 15, 1947) is an American chess player. He was awarded the title Grandmaster by FIDE for winning the 2008 World Seniors Championship (which he later retroactively shared with Mihai Șubă). Kaufman had been previously awarded the title International Master in 1980.

== Background ==
A longtime researcher in computer chess, Kaufman has made several contributions to chess-related works. He helped write the opening book for the pioneering program Mac Hack, co-developed Socrates II and its commercial adaptation, Kasparov's Gambit, edited the journal Computer Chess Reports, and worked on many other research and commercial chess engines. He is also known for his work on computer chess engine Rybka 3, and several books and articles, including "The Evaluation of Material Imbalances". On March 17, 2023, Larry Kaufman announced that he is now a paid consultant for Chess.com for the development of the chess engine Dragon by Komodo Chess.

He has written that a variant of Capablanca chess – Grand Chess "is an excellent game and deserves a bigger following".

He is also a shogi player and teacher. In 1999, he was the only person in the world to have earned a 2400 rating in both chess and shogi.

== Works ==
- The Chess Advantage in Black and White: Opening Moves of the Grandmasters (2004).
- The Kaufman Repertoire for Black and White: A Complete, Sound and User-friendly Chess Opening Repertoire (2012).
- Sabotage the Grunfeld: A Cutting-Edge Repertoire for White based on 3.f3 (2014).
- Kaufman’s New Repertoire for Black and White: A Complete, Sound and User-friendly Chess Opening Repertoire (2019).
- Chess Board Options: A Memoir of Players, Games and Engines (2021).
- Kaufman, Larry (March 1999), "The Evaluation of Material Imbalances", Chess Life
