= Chessmaster 2000 =

1986 video game

The Chessmaster 2000
- Cover art featuring Will Hare
- Developer: The Software Toolworks
- Series: Chessmaster
- Platforms: Amiga, Amstrad CPC, Apple II, Atari 8-bit, Atari ST Commodore 64, MS-DOS, Mac, MSX, ZX Spectrum
- Release: 1986

The Chessmaster 2000 is a computer chess game by The Software Toolworks. It was the first in the Chessmaster series and published in 1986. It was released for Amiga, Apple II, Atari 8-bit computers, Atari ST, ZX Spectrum, Commodore 64, Amstrad CPC, MSX, Macintosh, and IBM PC compatibles.

== Gameplay ==
Chessmaster 2000 is a chess engine made for chess players ranging from novice to professional skill levels. In the game, players can play against a computer opponent with 12 different skill levels available to choose from. They can also elect to receive assistance from aides in the game, such as hints offered by the CPU. Players could also turn the board 90 degrees in 3D. The game has documentation on famous chess matches from past tournaments, and allows players to recreate the positions from those events. Copies of the game were bundled with an illustrated booklet from the U.S. Chess Federation, and included a discount on membership to the USCF.

== Reception ==
Compute! stated that Chessmaster 2000 "is now the yardstick for which other similar programs will be measured", and favorably cited Software Toolworks' decision to give all versions of the game the same sophisticated engine. In 1986, Computer Gaming World wrote of the IBM PC version, "I wish I could find something negative to include in this review but I can't ... It gets my absolute highest recommendation". It was noted that the game had a sophisticated defense, but would resign in hopeless situations without forcing the human to finish an inevitable win. The magazine also favorably reviewed the Amiga version, calling the graphics "exceptional" and concluding "highly recommended". Info gave the Amiga version five stars out of five, describing it as "the definitive chess program for the AMIGA", praising the graphics, user interface, and options. The magazine gave the Commodore 64 version three stars out of five, stating that it had almost all of the Amiga version's features but criticizing the requirement of using algebraic notation to move. Antic found that Chessmaster 2000 defeated Colossus Chess and Odesta Chess. The magazine criticized the Atari 8-bit version's playability, stating that "the 3-D display is unusable even on a very good monitor–you can't tell the overlapping pieces apart", lack of a chess clock, and poor documentation and controls.

Bob Ewald reviewed Chessmaster 2000 in Space Gamer/Fantasy Gamer No. 78. Ewald commented that "It is a good program for learning the game, playing on many different competitive levels, ease of movement, and replaying famous games."

Chessmaster 2000 became the first and only chess game to be the top-rated game in Computer Gaming World's reader poll, with a score of 7.25 out of 10. In 1988, it was among the first members of the magazine's Hall of Fame, honoring those games rated highly over time by readers. In 1996, Computer Gaming World declared the original Chessmaster the 46th-best computer game ever released.

The game sold 140,000 copies.
