= Rally Challenge =

- Developer: Silver Lightning Software
- Publisher: Silver Lightning Software
- Platform: Windows
- Release: 1996
- Genre: Action/Arcade

Rally Challenge is a 1996 video game developed and published by Silver Lightning Software.

== Gameplay ==
In Rally Challenge, the player races turbo‑charged cars through treacherous international rally stages using various viewpoints and control options.

== Development ==
Rally Challenge was developed in fifteen months by Perth, Australia-based studio Silver Lightning Software. In the Italian version of Rally Challenge, the voice of the virtual navigator is Claudia Peroni, a sports host on Fininvest networks.

== Reception ==
Reception

Review scores
Publication	Score
The Games Machine	73%
Hacker	55%

The Games Machine criticized the sound and controls in Rally Challenge. Hacker found Rally Challenge too demanding for what it offers.
