= Conflict: Middle East =

1991 video game

- Developer: Strategic Simulations
- Publisher: Strategic Simulations
- Release: 1991

Conflict: Middle East is a 1991 video game published by Strategic Simulations.

== Gameplay ==
Conflict: Middle East is a game in which a brigade-level simulation is set in the Middle East, and each game turn takes half of a day.

== Reception ==
Alan Emrich and Gary E. Smith reviewed the game for Computer Gaming World, and stated that "Documented warfare has gone on in this region for over 4,000 years; Conflict: Middle East allows one to explore the more recent battles there and in some highly polished detail. It also offers insight into the great Israeli nightmare "what if" (another war). One can see the effects of that "no land to trade for peace" mentality at the peace conferences making today's headlines."

Amiga Action rated the game 74% and said "Without a doubt SSI are the kings of the strategy market. Barely a month goes by without them releasing something. By now many people will be familiar with their operating system and will be able to plough into Conflict: Middle East without any problems. SSI fans will enjoy this product but unfortunately this sort of thing has been seen so many times before."
