= PC Arcade =

1983 video game

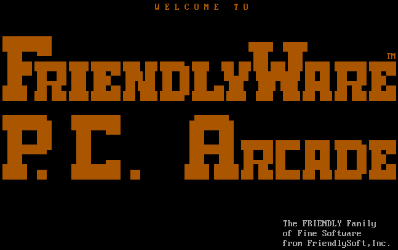
- Developer(s): Friendlysoft
- Publisher(s): Friendlysoft
- Platform(s): IBM PC
- Release: WW: 1983
- Genre(s): Action
- Mode(s): Single-player, multiplayer

PC Arcade is a collection of ten text-mode action games for the IBM PC published by the Arlington, Texas-based Friendlysoft in 1983.

== Contents ==
The games included in PC Arcade are ASCII Man, Eagle Lander, Star Fighter TX-16, Shooter, Brick Breaker, Gorilla Gorilla, Robot War, Bug Blaster, Hopper, and PC Derby. Most of the games are clones of arcade games:

- ASCII Man is a clone of Pac-Man
- Eagle Lander is a clone of Defender
- Brick Breaker is a clone of Breakout
- Gorilla Gorilla is a clone of Donkey Kong
- Robot War is a clone of Berzerk
- Bug Blaster is a clone of Centipede
- Hopper is a clone of Frogger

== Reception ==
Stefan Jones reviewed PC Arcade in Space Gamer No. 66. Jones commented that "I highly recommend PC Arcade to PC users who want to try arcade games but don't care about superb graphics or absolute fidelity to the classics these games emulate. Hard-core arcadists (arcadites? Arcaders?) may be disappointed, though."

FriendlySoft claimed, in a 1983 PC Magazine ad, that "the first two PC ARCADE production runs sold out before they shipped."

== Reviews ==
- PC Magazine
