= Ultimate Domain =

1993 video game

- Developer: Microïds
- Publishers: EU: Mindscape; NA: The Software Toolworks
- Platforms: Amiga, MS-DOS, iOS
- Release: EU: 1993 (Amiga); EU/NA: 1994 (MS-DOS); WW: 2011 (iOS)

Ultimate Domain, known as Genesia in Europe, is a video game developed by Microïds and published by Mindscape initially on the Amiga in 1993 and then ported for the IBM PC in 1994. The original Amiga version is known to be one of the few commercial games developed in AMOS (programming language).

In 2011, an iPad version was released. A follow-up to Ultimate Domain named Genesia Legacy was scheduled to be released in 2015.

== Plot ==
Ultimate Domain is a game which starts in the 17th century in the New World colonies, where the player has four settlers and a small amount of raw materials. The settlers can take professions including woodcutters who make logs, architects who make buildings, and specialists who make goods for sale. The settlers may also search for "The Seven Jewels of Genesia".

== Reception ==
Computer Gaming World rated Ultimate Domain one star out of five. Describing it as a lackluster combination of Populous and Civilization, the magazine reported that it was possible to win the game without expanding from the starting position, concluding that "If that doesn't sound a death knell for a game of empire building, I don't know what does". The game was reviewed in 1995 in Dragon #213 by Jay & Dee in the "Eye of the Monitor" column. Both reviewers gave the game 2 out of 5 stars.
