= Chessmaster 5000 =

1996 video game

- Cover art featuring Will Hare
- Developer: Mindscape
- Publisher: Mindscape
- Series: Chessmaster
- Platform: Windows
- Release: July 1996 (5000); 1997 (5500)
- Genre: Computer chess
- Modes: Single-player, multiplayer

Chessmaster 5000 is a 1996 chess video game developed and published by Mindscape for Windows. It is part of the Chessmaster series. An upgraded version, Chessmaster 5500, was released in 1997. An online game, Chessmaster Live, was included with 5500. The chess engine was designed by Tasc ChessSystem.

== Gameplay ==
Chessmaster 5000 uses a 32-bit chess engine and can be optimized for stronger play if used with a Pentium chip. The computer opponent can adopt over 70 different styles of famous grandmasters. The player can also design their own style for the computer. The multiplayer supports hotseat, network, and online play. Included with the game are 20 tutorials and a 27,000-game chess database. Chessmaster 5500 added voice instruction to the game. Included with the purchase of 5500 was a copy and free subscription to Chessmaster Live, an online game that was also available separately on the chessmaster.com website.

== Reception ==
Reception

Review scores
Publication	Score
Computer Games Strategy Plus	2.5/5 (5000); 4/5 (5500, Live)
Computer Gaming World	5/5
GameSpot	9.3/10 (5000, 5500)
Joystick	84%
Génération 4	4/6 (5000); 5/6 (5500)
PC Joker	76%
Power Play	81%

Chessmaster 5000 received generally positive reviews. In a 1995 comparison between 11 chess programs, Computer Gaming World rated a pre-release version of Chessmaster 5000 the highest. In a 1996 review, Computer Gaming World liked the quality of the computer opponents and the tutorials but disliked the MIDI music and the rating system. It was called "simply the best program ever designed for the mainstream chess player". GameSpot called Chessmaster 5000 "the finest chess software I have ever used." Reviewing Chessmaster 5500, GameSpot said: "The worst thing you can say about Chessmaster 5500 is that you might not want to spend the bucks on it if you already own Chessmaster 5000 - but that's more of a comment on how outstanding the Chessmaster series is rather than a slam against the latest installment." In a comparison between four chess programs, PC Joker rated Chessmaster 5000 third behind Power Chess and Mephisto Genius 3.5. Computer Games Strategy Plus criticized the lack of PGN support and described the database as "broken". The game was summarized: "If you just want a good chess playing program with lots of eye candy, Chessmaster 5000 will suit you fine. If you need a serious training partner, skip it and buy Rebel 8 or Fritz." Computer Games Strategy Plus gave a more positive review for Chessmaster 5500, which was said to fix bugs from the previous version although a few issues still remained. Computer Games Strategy Plus also reviewed Chessmaster Live, an online game included with 5500. It was said that "The program is simple to use and contains all the features needed to enjoy an on-line chess session."
