= Komodo (chess) =

UCI chess engine

- Original authors: Don Dailey; Larry Kaufman
- Developers: Komodo Chess, Chess.com
- Release: January 2010; 16 years ago
- Stable release: Komodo 14.1 / November 2, 2020; 5 years ago
- Written in: C, C++
- Operating system: Linux, Microsoft Windows, Mac OS X, Android
- Predecessor: Komodo
- Type: Chess engine
- License: Proprietary
- Website: komodochess.com

Dragon by Komodo Chess
- Developers: Komodo Chess, Chess.com
- Release: November 9, 2020; 5 years ago
- Stable release: Dragon 3.3 / October 4, 2023; 3 years ago
- Written in: C, C++
- Operating system: Linux, Microsoft Windows, Mac OS X, Android
- Predecessor: Doch
- Successor: Dragon
- Type: Chess engine
- License: Proprietary
- Website: komodochess.com

Komodo and Dragon by Komodo Chess (also known as Dragon or Komodo Dragon) are UCI chess engines developed by Komodo Chess, which is a part of Chess.com. The engines were originally authored by Don Dailey and GM Larry Kaufman. Dragon is a commercial chess engine, but Komodo is free for non-commercial use. Dragon is consistently ranked near the top of most major chess engine rating lists, along with Stockfish and Leela Chess Zero.

== History ==
=== Komodo ===
Komodo logo

Komodo was derived from Don Dailey's former engine Doch in January 2010. The first multiprocessor version of Komodo was released in June 2013 as Komodo 5.1 MP. This version was a major rewrite and a port of Komodo to C++11. A single-processor version of Komodo (which won the CCT15 tournament in February earlier that year) was released as a stand-alone product shortly before the 5.1 MP release. This version, named Komodo CCT, was still based on the older C code, and was approximately 30 Elo stronger than the 5.1 MP version, as the latter was still undergoing massive code-cleanup work.

With the release of Komodo 6 on October 4, 2013, Don Dailey announced that he was suffering from an acute form of leukaemia, and would no longer contribute to the future development of Komodo. On October 8, Don made an announcement on the Talkchess forum that Mark Lefler would be joining the Komodo team and would continue its development.

Komodo TCEC was released on December 4, 2013. This was the same version that had won TCEC Season 5, and was the last with input from Don Dailey, to whom it was dedicated. Komodo 7 was released on May 21, 2014, adding Syzygy tablebase support.

On May 24, 2018, Chess.com announced that it has acquired Komodo and that the Komodo team have joined Chess.com. The Komodo team is now called Komodo Chess.

On December 17, 2018, Komodo Chess released Komodo 12.3 MCTS, a version of the Komodo 12.3 engine that uses Monte Carlo tree search instead of alpha–beta pruning/minimax.

The last version, Komodo 14.1, was released on November 2, 2020.

=== Dragon ===
On November 9, 2020, Komodo Chess released Dragon by Komodo Chess 1.0, which features the use of efficiently updatable neural networks in its evaluation function. Dragon is derived from Komodo in the same way that Komodo was derived from Doch. Dragon is also called Komodo Dragon in certain tournaments such as the Top Chess Engine Championship and the World Computer Chess Championship (WCCC) but not in the Chess.com Computer Chess Championship (CCC). A Chess.com staff member named Dmitry Pervov joined the Dragon development team to write the NNUE code for Dragon, and Dietrich Kappe joined the Dragon development team to help Larry Kaufman and Mark Lefter train Dragon's neural networks.

On March 17, 2023, Larry Kaufman announced that he and Mark Lefter have stepped down from Dragon development and from ownership of Komodo Chess, and that Chess.com have taken full control of Komodo Chess. As of March 17, 2023, Dietrich Kappe is the only person responsible for the development of Dragon, but Chess.com are looking for more programmers to help with Dragon development.

The final version, Dragon 3.3, was released on October 4, 2023.

== Competition results ==
=== Komodo ===
Komodo has played in the ICT 2010 in Leiden, and further in the CCT12 and CCT14. Komodo had its first tournament success in 1999, when it won the CCT15 with a score of 6½/7. Komodo won both the World Computer Chess Championship and World Computer Software Championship in 2016. Komodo once again won the World Computer Chess Championship and World Blitz in 2017.

In TCEC competition, Komodo was historically one of the strongest engines. In Season 4, it lost only eight out of its 53 games and managed to reach Stage 4 (Quarterfinals), against very strong competition which were running on eight cores (Komodo was running on a single processor). The next season, Komodo won the superfinal against Stockfish. The two engines jockeyed for the championship over the next few seasons: Stockfish won in Season 6, while Komodo won Seasons 7 and 8. Komodo failed to make the superfinal in Season 9, losing out to Houdini; but after Houdini was later disqualified for containing code plagiarized from Stockfish, Komodo was promoted to the runner-up. Komodo retrospectively won Season 10 in the same way. Starting from Season 11 however, Stockfish improved at a rate that left its rivals behind, crushing Komodo in Season 12 and 13. The advent of the neural network engine Leela Chess Zero meant Komodo has largely failed to qualify for the superfinal since, with a single exception in Season 22, when it lost to Stockfish. Although Komodo has not qualified for the superfinal, it has cemented itself as the third-strongest engine in the competition, finishing in that position for five of the last six seasons.

==== Chess.com Computer Chess Championship ====
Main events
Event	Year	Time controls	Result	Ref.
CCC 1	2018	15+5	4th	
CCC 2	2018	5+2	2nd	
CCC 3	2019	30+5	3rd	
CCC 4	2019	1+2	4th	
CCC 5	2019	10+5	4th	
CCC 6	2019	10+10	7th	
CCC 7	2019	5+2	6th	
CCC 8	2019	15+5	6th	
CCC 9	2019	5+2	5th	
CCC 10	2019	10+3	4th	
CCC 11	2019	30+5	4th	
CCC 12	2020	1+1	4th	
CCC 13	2020	10+5	4th	
CCC 14	2020	10+3	5th	
CCC Blitz 2020	2020	5+5	9th	
CCC Blitz 2021	2021	5+5	10th	
CCC Chess 960 Blitz	2021	5+5	9th	

=== Dragon ===
==== Chess.com Computer Chess Championship ====
Main events
Event	Year	Time controls	Result	Ref.
CCC Blitz 2020	2020	5+5	3rd	
CCC Rapid 2021	2021	15+3	3rd	
CCC Blitz 2021	2021	5+5	3rd	
CCC Chess 960 Blitz	2021	5+5	2nd	
CCC 16: Rapid	2021	15+3	3rd	
CCC 16: Bullet	2021	2+1	2nd	
CCC 16: Blitz	2022	5+5	2nd	
CCC 17: Rapid	2022	15+3	2nd	
CCC 17: Bullet	2022	2+1	2nd	
CCC 17: Blitz	2022	5+5	3rd	
CCC 18: Rapid	2022	15+3	3rd	
CCC 19: Blitz	2022	5+5	2nd	
CCC 19: Rapid	2022	15+3	3rd	
CCC 19: Bullet	2023	1+1	2nd	
CCC 20: Blitz	2023	3+2	3rd	
CCC 20: Rapid	2023	10+3	3rd	
CCC 20: Bullet	2023	1+1	3rd	
CCC 21: Blitz	2023	3+2	4th	
CCC 21: Rapid	2023	10+3	4th	

==== Top Chess Engine Championship ====
Main events
Event	Year	Time controls	Result	Ref.
Season 1	2010		3rd (Division 2)	
Season 2	2011		1st (division C)	
Season 4	2013		4th	
Season 5	2013		1st	
Season 6	2014		2nd	
Season 7	2014		1st	
Season 8	2015		1st	
Season 9	2016		3rd	
Season 10	2017		2nd	
Season 11	2018		3rd	
Season 12	2018		1st	
Season 13	2018		2nd	
Season 14	2018-2019		5th	
Season 15	2019		6th	
Season 16	2019		7th	
Season 17	2020		8th	
Season 18	2020		5th	
Season 19	2020		5th	
Season 20	2020	60+7	3rd	
Season 21	2021	90+9	3rd	
Season 22	2022	120+12	2nd	
Season 23	2022	60+6	3rd	
Season 24	2023	60+6	3rd	
Season 25	2023	60+6	3rd	
Season 26	2024		4th	
Season 27	2025		5th	
Season 28	2025		7th	
Season 29	2026		6th (League 1)	

Cup
Event	Year	Time controls	Result	Ref.
Cup 8	2021	30+5	3rd	
Cup 9	2021	30+5	3rd	
Cup 10	2022	30+3	2nd	
Cup 11	2023	30+3	3rd	

Fischer random chess (FRC)
Event	Year	Time controls	Result	Ref.
FRC 3	2021	30+5	1st	
FRC 4	2022	30+5	3rd	

Swiss
Event	Year	Time controls	Result	Ref.
Swiss 1	2021	45+7	1st	
Swiss 2	2022	45+7	1st	
Swiss 3	2022	45+4.5	4th	
Swiss 4	2023	30+3	2nd	

== Notable games ==
Komodo vs Hannibal

Position: a8 black rook, d7 black bishop, e7 black rook, g7 black king, h7 black pawn, c6 black pawn, f6 black pawn, g6 black pawn, b5 black pawn, c5 white rook, d5 black pawn, a4 black pawn, b4 white pawn, d4 white pawn, f4 white pawn, h4 white pawn, e3 white pawn, a2 white pawn, f2 white pawn, g2 white bishop, c1 white rook, g1 white king

Komodo plays the exchange sacrifice 33. Rxc6 and goes on to win the game, proving the superiority of its pieces over Black's two rooks.
- Komodo vs Hannibal, nTCEC - Stage 2b - Season 1, Round 4.1, ECO: A10, 1–0 Komodo sacrifices an exchange for positional gain.
- Gull vs Komodo, nTCEC - Stage 3 - Season 2, Round 2.2, ECO: E10, 0–1
