= Cybergenic Ranger: Secret of the Seventh Planet =

1990 video game

- Developer: Symtus
- Publisher: Symtus
- Platform: MS-DOS
- Release: 1990

Cybergenic Ranger: Secret of the Seventh Planet is a computer game developed by Symtus in 1990 for MS-DOS.

== Plot ==
Cybergenic Ranger: Secret of the Seventh Planet is a game in which the player character is saved by his parents from certain death by renegade robots, and survived because someone gave him cybergenic enhancements. The character thus becomes the Cybergenic Ranger, to defeat the robots that killed his parents. The player starts off with no weaponry on his ship, requiring the player to search planets for anything that will enhance the power of the ship.

== Reception ==
Computer Gaming World called Cybergenic Ranger "an IBM game in Sega clothing", inspired by Altered Beast and many other science-fiction stories and arcade games. Although stating that "compared to a good Sega game" it "sometimes has a second-rate feel", the magazine recommended Cybergenic Ranger to "the dedicated MS-DOS gamer who wants a solid action fix". In 1991, Dragon gave the game 1 out of 5 stars. COMPUTE! praised the graphics, calling them "lovingly detailed" with a "true arcade 3-D effect."
