= Chess Champion 2175 =

1990 video game

- Developer: Oxford Softworks
- Publishers: EU: Oxford Softworks; NA: Interplay Entertainment
- Designer: Chris Whittington
- Platforms: Amiga, Atari ST, MS-DOS, Classic Mac OS
- Release: EU: August 1990; NA: December 1990
- Genre: Computer chess
- Modes: Single-player, multiplayer

Chess Champion 2175 (known in North America as Checkmate) is a 1990 chess video game developed and published by Oxford Softworks. It was published in North America by Interplay Entertainment. The game is a successor to Chess Player 2150.

== Gameplay ==
Chess Champion 2175 is a game in which the program learns from experience, adapting to the style of a player.

The computer adds moves and situations to its library, allowing the artificial intelligence to learn and improve.

== Reception ==
Reception

Review scores
Publication	Score
ACE	700/1000 (ST)
Amiga Format	77%
Amiga Power	80%
Génération 4	69%
Joystick	85% (Mac)
.info	4+/5

Ben Mitchell for ACE stated that "Unless you are a connoisseur of chess games or have beaten your old chess program then it is probably not worth upgrading to Chess Champion 2175.

Amiga Format summarized: "[...] Chess Champion stands up well and provides an excellent game for beginner and experienced amateur alike."

Amiga Power said that "The game's mouse-only control is intuitive, its apparent depth - we're talking a huge library of opening moves here - is awesome and the level of tutoring offered is comprehensive."

Génération 4 said it is superior to its competition of the moment, looks good, and does not suffer from major faults.

Jay Kee reviewed the game for Computer Gaming World, and stated that "Just another chess program? Is the Taj Mahal just another building? Is Bo Jackson just another ball player? No. They are all outstanding."

Judith Kilbury-Cobb for .info said that "If you've never played chess before, or even if you consider yourself an expert, check out Checkmate."

InCider said "If you've ever wondered how a computer plays chess, you can watch Checkmate as it asks 'what if?' of hundreds of possible moves."

Cameron Crotty for Electronic Entertainment said that "CheckMate features much stronger game play – enough to keep even advanced club players hopping. The bare-bones interface lets you control the computer's style of play, and you can even tell your Mac to play a particular line from its large opening library."
