= The Software Toolworks =

American software developer

The Software Toolworks, Inc.
- Company type: Subsidiary
- Industry: Video games
- Founded: 1980; 46 years ago in Sherman Oaks, California, US
- Founder: Walt Bilofsky
- Defunct: 1994
- Fate: Rebranded as Mindscape
- Headquarters: Novato, California, US
- Number of employees: 600 (1994)
- Parent: Pearson plc (1994)
- Website: toolworks.com

The Software Toolworks, Inc. (commonly abbreviated as Toolworks), was an American software and video game developer based in Novato, California. The company was founded by Walt Bilofsky in 1980 out of his Sherman Oaks garage, which he converted into an office, to develop software for the Heathkit H89 microcomputer. It quickly expanded into video games, releasing Airport and MyChess in 1980; other notable games include Chessmaster 2000, Mavis Beacon Teaches Typing, and Mario Is Missing!. Toolworks merged with its distributor, Software Country, in 1986 and, after going public in 1988, acquired IntelliCreations, DS Technologies, and Mindscape. By 1994, Toolworks employed 600 people and had a revenue of US$150 million. In May that year, it was acquired by Pearson plc for $462 million, which converted it to bear the Mindscape identity by November.

== History ==
=== Early years (1979–1982) ===
The Software Toolworks was founded by programmer Walt Bilofsky, who, after studying at Cornell University and the Massachusetts Institute of Technology (MIT), had worked for the Institute for Defense Analyses, as a programmer for RAND Corporation, and as a consultant. In 1979, he acquired and assembled a Heathkit H89 microcomputer; he found that the microcomputer lacked important software and thus began developing new software and ports of his own, including a fullscreen editor and a compiler for the C programming language entitled C/80, the latter based on Ron Cain's public-domain compiler Small-C. Bilofsky subsequently contacted the Heath Company, which made the Heathkit series of microcomputers, to have it market his software and, in response, was told that the operating system and the BASIC programming language Heathkit microcomputers came with were sufficient. He advertised his software in BUSS, a Heathkit hobbyist newsletter, in 1980, quickly receiving orders for his software. Bilofsky eventually adopted the name "The Software Toolworks", using it publicly for the first time with an advertisement submitted to the magazine Byte in June 1980. He converted his garage in Sherman Oaks, California, to a two-room office, outfitting it with a disk duplicator, shelving, and a shipping area. This office was later relocated into a garden shed. By the end of the year, Toolworks had entered the video game business, having published Airport, an air traffic control game by Jim Gillogly, and MyChess, a chess game by Dave Kittinger. This continued in 1981, with Robert Wesson developing a clone of Pac-Man, the game Munchkin, and a port of Invaders for the H89, and Bilofksy adapting the artificial intelligence psychiatrist ELIZA. Other early non-game software for HDOS and CP/M included the spreadsheet editor Zencalc (later replaced by MyCalc), the text editor PIE, the text formatting application TEXT, and the spelling checker SPELL.

One of Toolworks' major releases was a port of Adventure, a text adventure game developed by William Crowther in 1975 and later expanded by Don Woods. Gillogly made Bilofsky aware of the game and, by 1982, was able to get the game running on an H89 using Bilofsky's C/80 compiler. Although the game was in the public domain, Bilofsky decided to release an official version with the approval of Crowther and Woods. This version was expanded so that, at the end of the game, the player is admitted into a fictional "Wizards' Guild" and given a password that could be posted to Toolworks in return for a "Certificate of Wizardness", underwritten by Crowther and Woods, and signed with the Toolworks corporate seal, the only time this seal was used. The game was released in 1982 and came with a manual packaged in a Ziploc bag.

=== Expansion (1983–1987) ===
In 1983, Toolworks was joined by Joe Abrams, Bilofsky's cousin. That same year, the company moved into a proper, three-room office on the 11th floor of a Sherman Oaks bank building, opposite Sherman Oaks Galleria. This move was made possible by Toolworks' growing sales, and by this time, its products were sold through more than 50 Heathkit stores, and it had released a total of 40 products by 1984. That year, distributor Software Country and its manager, Les Crane, licensed Toolworks' versions of Adventure and ELIZA for a software compilation disk titled Golden Oldies Vol I, which was released the following year. Subsequently, Crane agreed with Abrams that Software Country would market a chess game developed by Toolworks; for this project, Toolworks brought on Mike Duffy, who had ported MyChess to IBM PC and PCjr, and the team developed Chessmaster 2000. Crane stepped up the marketing efforts for the game, paying US$10,000 for the cover photo. Bilofsky described this change as the "emphatic end of the Ziploc bag era". Chessmaster 2000 was released in 1986 and sold 100,000 copies within seven months. Building from this success, Toolworks and Software Country merged in October 1986, with Toolworks as the surviving entity. The merged company then bought Priority Software Packaging, a disk duplication and software packaging company, the following November.

Following the merger, Crane conceived a typing application in which the user would be guided by Mavis Beacon, a fictional typing instructor who would correct the user's mistakes. The product, Mavis Beacon Teaches Typing, was developed by Bilofsky, Duffy and Norman Worthington from Bilofsky's home in six months, with Duffy often working more than 140 hours per week. The team aimed at making the application more fun to keep users engaged, thus it incorporated large quantities of text it deemed interesting, generated mistake analyses, and made it visually appealing. Renée L'Espérance, a Haitian woman whom Crane and Abrams had met at a Saks Fifth Avenue store, was contracted to represent Mavis Beacon. Due to her darker skin, several stores initially refused to sell the application when it was released in 1987. This changed when a positive review of the application published in The New York Times generated much demand, restoring all of Toolworks' usual distribution channels within two weeks.

=== As a public company and under Pearson (1987–1994) ===
In February 1987, Toolworks signed a distribution deal with Electronic Arts (expanded for distribution in Europe in July), which required Toolworks to port each new game to Apple II, Apple III, Apple IIGS, Mac, IBM PCjr, Atari 8-bit computers, Atari ST, Commodore 64, Amiga, and both monochrome and color IBM PC compatibles. Each team member at the company was tasked with developing one of the ports but the undertaking eventually proved a financial strain and Toolworks ran out of funds by the end of 1987. To raise new capital, the company became a public company in January 1988, through a reverse merger with Deseret-Western Venture Capital, an existing public shell corporation registered in Utah. By June 1988, Toolworks had 45 employees. Shortly thereafter, the company acquired developers IntelliCreations (of Chatsworth, California) in August 1988 and DS Technologies (of West Chicago, Illinois) in February 1989. With the acquisition of IntelliCreations, Toolworks announced that it would move its headquarters to Chatsworth. Toolworks also agreed with manufacturer Vendex to have Toolworks' games included with Vendex's machines. Life & Death, a surgery simulation game was released in 1988. In 1989, the company released Beyond the Black Hole, a stereoscopic 3-D arcade game that came with 3-D glasses. By 1989, Chessmaster games and Mavis Beacon Teaches Typing had collectively sold 750,000 through retail and licensing deals. Looking to get a hold of a development license for Nintendo platforms, which were difficult to obtain, Toolworks acquired Mindscape, an existing license holder based in Northbrook, Illinois, in March 1990. Using Mindscape's license, Toolworks released a follow-up to Mavis Beacon Teaches Typing focused on piano teaching: Miracle Piano Teaching System. The application came with a physical velocity-sensitive keyboard, which Toolworks had ordered 100,000 of. The required quantity was overestimated and many keyboards were damaged in transit, causing high financial losses for Toolworks. In April 1990, Elizabeth Barker became the president and chief operating officer (COO) of Toolworks, succeeding Crane (who remained chairman and chief executive officer) in the president role, and was succeeded herself in both roles by Robert Lloyd in November 1990. In September 1990, Toolworks moved from Chatsworth to Novato.

While in talks with Japanese original equipment manufacturers (OEMs) in Japan, the chief executive officer of Philips introduced Abrams to CD-ROM drives; CD-ROM discs could store high capacities of data but drives for them were uncommon in households at the time. Developer LucasArts had completed three CD-ROM games but struggled to sell them. In 1992, Toolworks licensed the games from LucasArts and had them distributed with new PCs by the Japanese OEMs. Within one month, this led to more sales of these games than LucasArts had achieved in the two years prior. The period from 1992–1993 saw the release of several titles: Star Wars Chess, Mario's Time Machine, Mario's Early Years!, Legend, San Diego Zoo Presents: The Animals!, and the PC version of Ultimate Domain. By 1993 Computer Gaming World described Toolworks as "the reigning king of software repackaging efforts" (shovelware) on CD-ROM.

Toolworks continued to grow further, to 600 employees by 1994, when it was generating annual revenue of $150 million. That May, the company was acquired by British media company Pearson plc for $462 million. Shortly thereafter, by November, Toolworks had assumed the Mindscape moniker for all of its operations, which is considered the end of Toolworks.

== Games ==
- Airport (1980)
- Mychess (1980)
- ELIZA (1981)
- Munchkin (1981)
- Adventure (1982)
- Golden Oldies: Volume 1 - Computer Software Classics (1985)
- Chessmaster 2000 (1986)
- Mavis Beacon Teaches Typing! (1987)
- The Fidelity Chessmaster 2100 (1988)
- Life & Death (1988)
- The Hunt for Red October (1988)
- Cribbage King / Gin King (1989)
- Beyond the Black Hole (1989)
- The Chessmaster (1989)
- Bruce Lee Lives (1989)
- Orb-3D (1990)
- The Games People Play: Gin ∙ Cribbage ∙ Checkers ∙ Backgammon (1990)
- Life & Death II: The Brain (1990)
- Miracle Piano Teaching System (1990)
- The Big Deal (1991)
- The Chessmaster 3000 (1991)
- Legend (1992)
- San Diego Zoo Presents: The Animals! (1992)
- Mario Is Missing! (1993)
- Mario's Early Years!: Fun with Letters (1993)
- Capitol Hill (1993)
- The Chessmaster 4000 Turbo (1993)
- Star Wars Chess (1993)
- Mario's Time Machine (1993)
- MegaRace (1993)
- Mario's Early Years!: Fun with Numbers (1994)
- Mavis Beacon Teaches Typing! for Kids (1994)
- Mario's Early Years!: Preschool Fun (1994)
- Ultimate Domain (1994)
- Evasive Action (1994)
- Maniac Sports (1994)
- Space Shuttle (1994)
- Al Unser Jr.'s Road to the Top (1994)
- NCAA Football (1994)

== Software ==
- 20th Century Video Almanac
