= Battle Chess =

1988 video game

- Cover art showing the red queen killing a blue knight
- Developers: Interplay Productions; Silicon & Synapse (C64)
- Publisher: Interplay Productions: EU: Electronic Arts; Data East (NES)
- Producer: Brian Fargo
- Designers: Michael Quarles; Jayesh J. Patel; Troy P. Worrell
- Artists: Todd J. Camasta; Bruce Schlickbernd
- Platforms: Amiga, 3DO, Archimedes, CD32, CDTV, Apple IIGS, Apple II, Atari ST, Commodore 64, MS-DOS, FM Towns, NES, Mac, PC-98, X68000, Windows
- Release: 1988–1994
- Genre: Chess
- Modes: Single-player, Multiplayer

Battle Chess is a 1988 chess video game developed and published by Interplay Productions for the Amiga. It was ported to many other systems, including the 3DO Interactive Multiplayer, Acorn Archimedes, Amiga CD32, Amiga CDTV, Apple IIGS, Apple II, Atari ST, Commodore 64, MS-DOS, FM Towns, Nintendo Entertainment System, MacOS, PC-98, X68000, and Microsoft Windows. In 1991, Battle Chess Enhanced was released by Interplay for IBM PC compatibles and Macintosh with improved VGA graphics and a symphonic musical score played from the CD-ROM.

Battle Chess was critically acclaimed and commercially successful, resulting in two official follow-ups as well as several inspired games. A remake, Battle Chess: Game of Kings, was released on Steam on December 11, 2015.

== Gameplay ==
Atari ST screenshot

Battle Chess follows the same rules as traditional chess, with pieces moving in an animated fashion and battles playing out so that the capturing piece defeats its target. Furthermore, when checkmate is delivered, the checkmating piece fights and defeats the king. Since there are six types of pieces for each color, and a king cannot check (let alone capture) another king, there are a total of 35 different battle animations. The rook, for example, turns into a rock monster and kills a pawn by smashing its head, and the rook kills the queen by eating her. There are some pop-culture homages; the knight versus knight animation references the black knight fight in Monty Python and the Holy Grail, and the king versus bishop fight pastiches the short battle between Indiana Jones and a swordsman in Raiders of the Lost Ark.

The game can be also played in a 2D version with no animations, and the Amiga CDTV version has a fully voiced introduction describing the movements of the pieces for the benefit of beginners. Digitized sound is used in the MS-DOS version for all battle sound effects and is played through the PC speaker, without the need for a sound card, using a technique akin to RealSound.

Battle Chess can be played against a human opponent (by hotseat, null modem or over a local area network in some ports) or against the computer's artificial intelligence (AI). The game has an opening library of over 30,000 moves (which were not available for the Commodore 64 and Apple II versions).

== Development ==
Battle Chess was the first title developed and published by Interplay Entertainment themselves after ending their relationship with Electronic Arts, besides Neuromancer.

Battle Chess producer and Interplay's founder Brian Fargo expressed his fondness for the game in a 2006 interview, although he added that he did not think there would be much of an audience for it today.

An possibly apocryphal story of the development was the invention of "The Duck" (an example of Parkinson's law of triviality): The producers of the game were known to demand changes to the game, presumably to make their mark on the finished product. To this end, one animator added a small duck around the queen piece, but made sure that the sprite would be easily removable. Come review, the producers, predictably, okayed everything but asked for the duck to be removed. This became known as Atwood's duck.

== Reception ==
Reception

Review scores
Publication	Score
Computer and Video Games	84%
Dragon	3.5/5; 5/5 (CD)
Electronic Gaming Monthly	6.2/10 (3DO)
Amiga User International	9/10
Commodore User	85%
ST/Amiga Format	84%

Battle Chess sold 250,000 copies by February 1993.

Ken St. Andre reviewed the game for Computer Gaming World, and stated that "Quibbles aside, every chess player will want a copy of this program, and every Amiga owner owes it to him/herself to see Battlechess in action. Highly recommended."

In Issue 12 of Gateways, Charles and Sydney Barouch called this "one of the better [chess games and] probably the prettiest chess game you will ever see." The Barouches noted that, unlike some other chess programs of the time, Battle Chess used all standard chess rules, including castling, en passant, and pawn promotion. They thought the manual was well written, and contained useful notes for new chess players. And they called the graphics and the sound effects "truly stunning." They concluded, "You may just find yourself places pieces in jeopardy just so you can have the opportunity to watch another battle."

The Amiga version received favourable reviews from magazines due to its comical battle sequences which were advanced (for the time) in terms of graphics, animation and sound. German game magazine ASM, however, criticized the weak chess AI. In a review of the 3DO version, Mike Weigand of Electronic Gaming Monthly stated, "If you are a chess fan, then you may want to check this title out."

In 1994 Computer Gaming World said of the remake, Battle Chess Enhanced, that "Better artwork, smoother animations, and a much stronger chess algorithm than its disk predecessors make the CD version a good buy".

Interplay won "Best Graphics Achievement In A Non-Graphics Product" from Software Publishers Association (later renamed to Software and Information Industry Association) for Battle Chess. In 1994 Computer Gaming World added it to the magazine's Hall of Fame honoring those games rated highly over time by readers, describing Battle Chess as "a showcase product for the first level of multimedia standards". In 1996 the magazine ranked it as the 106th-best game of all time for its "funny, elaborate animated sequences and spectacular special effects."

== Legacy ==
International Master Anna Rudolf credits Battle Chess with helping introduce her to chess at a young age.

The game was featured in the 1992 film Knight Moves about a chess grandmaster who is accused of several murders.

=== Sequels ===
A sequel titled Battle Chess II: Chinese Chess was released in 1990, based on xiangqi, commonly known as "Chinese chess". 1992's Battle Chess 4000 spoofed science fiction movies and television series (such as a battle sequence involving the monolith from 2001: A Space Odyssey) and used a clay-animation art style similar to ClayFighter.

On December 28, 2015, Brian Fargo revealed that he had started working on a second sequel of the game titled Battle Chess 3 in the late 1990s but the game was cancelled. He also released a footage of the prototype of the game.

=== Inspired games ===
Battle Chess also inspired a number of video game clones, such as Virtual Chess 64, Lego Chess, Star Wars Chess, Terminator 2: Judgment Day – Chess Wars, Combat Chess and National Lampoon's Chess Maniac 5 Billion and 1. Another clone, War Chess was released by XS Games for the PlayStation 2 in 2005, and was later ported to the PC by Big Fish Games and released online.

One similar game, titled Battle vs. Chess, was developed by TopWare Interactive for "just about every platform". However, Interplay filed and won an injunction for trademark infringement in 2010 and TopWare was prevented from releasing Battle vs. Chess in the United States. The District Court of California came into session and given that after two years of litigation, TopWare Interactive discharged their lawyer, resulting in Interplay winning the case by default. Afterwards, Topware released the game in North America under the name Check vs. Mate.

=== Remake ===
In 2012 Subdued Software launched a Kickstarter campaign to fund an updated version of Battle Chess. Although the campaign was unsuccessful, the game was ultimately published by Interplay under the name Battle Chess: Game of Kings and released on Steam in 2015.
