= The Fidelity Chessmaster 2100 =

1988 video game

- Cover art with Will Hare
- Publisher: The Software Toolworks
- Platforms: Amiga, Apple II, Apple IIGS, Classic Mac OS, Commodore 64, MS-DOS
- Release: 1988: IIGS, C64, Mac
- Genre: Computer chess
- Modes: Single-player, multiplayer

The Fidelity Chessmaster 2100 is a computer chess video game published in 1988 by The Software Toolworks for the Apple II, Apple IIGS, Classic Mac OS, and Commodore 64. Versions for MS-DOS and Amiga were later released. An Atari ST version was advertised and a Mega Drive version shown at Winter CES 1992, but neither were published.

== Gameplay ==
The Fidelity Chessmaster 2100 is a game in which 110 historical chess matches from 1834 to 1988 are included.

== Reception ==
Roy Wagner reviewed the game for Computer Gaming World, and stated that "The beginning chess player will find that Chessmaster 2100 is easier to beat with it's [sic] "Newcomer" and "Coffeehouse" option and this is something every beginner's ego needs."
