= Cool Croc Twins =

1991 video game

- Developer(s): Arcade Masters
- Publisher(s): Empire Software
- Programmer(s): Benoît Varasse
- Artist(s): Roman Vaidis; Ferdinand Boutard
- Composer(s): Skynnibone
- Platform(s): Amiga, Atari ST, Commodore 64, MS-DOS
- Release: NA: 1991
- Genre(s): Platform
- Mode(s): Single-player, multiplayer

Cool Croc Twins is a platform game developed by Arcade Masters and published by Empire Software for the Amiga, Atari ST, Commodore 64, and MS-DOS compatible operating systems in 1991. The player controls one of two crocodile twins named "Funk" and "Punk" respectively in an attempt to rescue a crocodile girl.

== Information ==
The main characters of the game are Punk and Funk Croc. They are the suitors of the croquette, Daisy. The game is played in a screen by screen and level to level challenges in order to get Daisy. There is a cute introduction to the game with SoundBlaster tunes. If the game is not being played in two-player, a computer plays as the second player.

== Gameplay ==
In two-player mode, the gamers need to jump, bash, and catch upgrades faster than the competitor. In order to win the game, the player must light up all the light bulbs and bump them with the characters' head. If the bulb is hit three times it will completely light up, and when every bulb is lit up, the player can continue onto the next level. On the higher levels, some of the light bulbs are invisible. Gravity is not an issue in this game. Punk and Funk race to light their bulbs first in order to win. There are obstacles such as walls and blocks that block the route to get the light bulbs. The player can have three movements that include:

- clockwise
- counter clock-wise
- jumping
- mirrored movement
- walking upside-down
