= Battle Chess II: Chinese Chess =

1990 video game

- Developer: Interplay Productions
- Publisher: Interplay Productions
- Platforms: Amiga, MS-DOS, MacOS, Windows
- Release: 1990

Battle Chess II: Chinese Chess is a 1990 video game published by Interplay Productions. It is a xiangqi game in which the pieces on a green field split down the center by a river, are placed at the intersecting points where the field is divided vertically by nine lines and horizontally by ten.

== Reception ==
Ken St. Andre reviewed the game for Computer Gaming World, and stated that "Technically excellent in many ways, Battle Chess II simply isn't as much fun as its predecessor. Of course, someone in China might totally disagree."

Paul Rand for CU Amiga rated the game 87% said that "there are far worse games available than Battle Chess II" for players wanting something a little different and good to look at.

Amiga Action gave the game a score of 86% and proclaimed that the game should not be missed due to its professionalism.

John Davison for Games-X rated the game 4 Xs.

Neil Jackson for Amiga Format rated the game 76% and praised the animations as attractive and highly amusing.

Chris Jenkins for ACE (Advanced Computer Entertainment) rated the game 895 and recommended the game for players looking for a challenge to "master a novel version of the endlessly fascinating game of chess".

Bob Guerra for Compute! said that this game brings the same excitement of the original game to Chinese chess.

Tom Malcom for Info gave the game 3 stars and was less impressed by this game than the original.
