= Chessmaster 3000 =

1991 video game

- Cover art with Will Hare
- Developer: The Software Toolworks
- Publisher: The Software Toolworks
- Series: Chessmaster
- Platforms: Classic Mac OS, MS-DOS, Windows 3.0
- Release: 1991: MS-DOS, Windows; October 1, 1993: Mac

The Chessmaster 3000 is a 1991 video game published by The Software Toolworks and an installment of the Chessmaster series.

== Gameplay ==
The Chessmaster 3000 is a game in which the computer opponents range in skill from Novice to Chessmaster.

== Reception ==
Computer Gaming World reported that Chessmaster 3000 had added "a lot" to its predecessors, with new tutorial features and a variety of computer opponents making the game "a truly impressive sequel".

Chessmaster 3000 was named the 40th best computer game ever by PC Gamer UK in 1997. The editors wrote that "it remains [...] the premier PC chess title, with just the right balance of fancy game options and high-end gameplay. ChessMaster 3000 runs much faster than subsequent versions of the game and makes a welcome change from guns and guts".
