= PC Player (German magazine) =

German video game magazine

- April 2001 cover
- Frequency: Monthly
- Circulation: 140,000
- Publisher: DMV-Verlag; WEKA Verlag; Future Verlag
- Founder: Heinrich Lenhardt; Boris Schneider
- First issue: December 1992
- Final issue: June 2001
- Country: Germany
- Language: German
- ISSN: 0943-6693
- OCLC: 85504377

PC Player is a German computer magazine that was published from December 1992 until June 2001. The founders were Heinrich Lenhardt and Boris Schneider. During its existence the magazine was published by three different companies: DMV-Verlag, WEKA Verlag and Future Verlag GmbH. It was published on a monthly basis. The magazine reached its peak circulation of 140,000 copies in March 1994. In 1996 it was the best-selling European PC magazine.
