= PC Joker =

German video game magazine

PC Joker was the first German-language video gaming magazine for IBM PC-compatible computers. It was published by Joker-Verlag alongside Amiga Joker.
