= Will Hare =

American actor

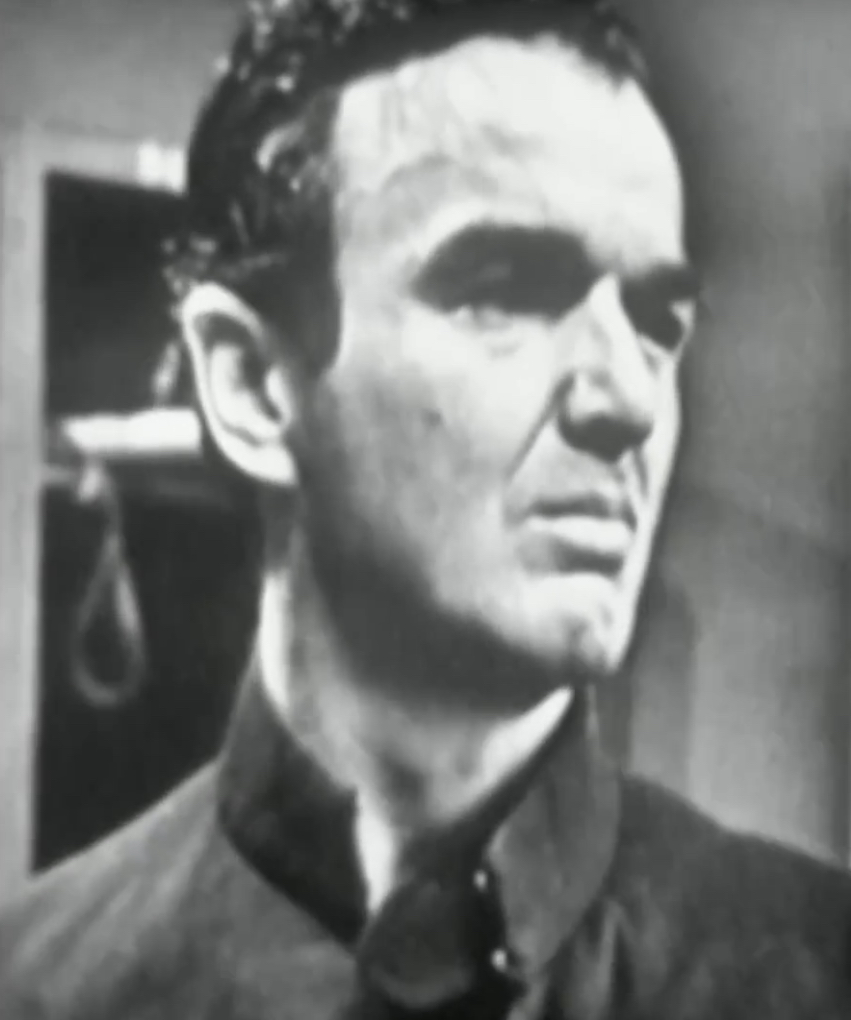
- Hare in the TV series Suspense (1950)
- Born: Will T Hare; March 30, 1916; Elkins, West Virginia, U.S.
- Died: August 31, 1997 (aged 81); New York City, New York, U.S.
- Occupation: Actor
- Years active: 1931–1997

Will T Hare (March 30, 1916 – August 31, 1997) was an American actor who appeared on television and films, often playing elderly figures and father/grandpa roles. He is perhaps best known for his role as Otis "Old Man" Peabody in Back to the Future (1985).

== Early life ==
Hare was born in Elkins, West Virginia, the son of Frances Laetitia (née Satterfield) and George Thomas Hare.

== Career ==
Hare had appeared on stage, screen, and television since he was 15. Becoming a veteran of stage for over a half of a century, Hare's film debut was Alfred Hitchcock's The Wrong Man (1956) and his final theatrical appearance was Me and Veronica in 1992. Hare's other distinctive film credits include roles in The Effect of Gamma Rays on Man-in-the-Moon Marigolds (1972), The Rose (1979), The Electric Horseman (1979), Enter the Ninja (1981), Eyes of Fire (1983), Silent Night, Deadly Night (1984), The Aviator (1985), Back to the Future (1985, as gun-toting farmer "Old Man Peabody"), Vendetta (1986) and Grim Prairie Tales (1990). Hare was also an active member of the Screen Actor's Guild for several years and also of the Actors Studio, where he died of a heart attack on August 31, 1997, during a rehearsal.

Hare also appeared in the cover art for the Chessmaster franchise of videogames created by The Software Toolworks as the iconic title character.

== Partial filmography ==
- The Greatest Gift (1954–1955) – Harold Matthews
- The Wrong Man (1956) – Raymond McKaba (uncredited)
- Without Each Other (1962) – Father
- The Effect of Gamma Rays on Man-in-the-Moon Marigolds (1972) – Junk Man
- Black Oak Conspiracy (1977) – Doc Roades
- Heaven Can Wait (1978) – Team Doctor
- Butch and Sundance: The Early Days (1979) – (uncredited)
- The Rose (1979) – Mr. Leonard
- The Electric Horseman (1979) – Gus
- Enter the Ninja (1981) – Dollars
- Pennies from Heaven (1981) – Father Everson
- Eyes of Fire (1983) – Calvin
- Silent Night, Deadly Night (1984) – Grandpa
- The Aviator (1985) – Old Man
- Back to the Future (1985) – Pa Peabody
- Vendetta (1986) – Judge Waters
- Grim Prairie Tales (1990) – Lee
- Me and Veronica (1993) – Red
- Mob Queen (1998) – Father Doyle (final film role; posthumous release)
