= Knightmare (1991 video game) =

- Amiga cover art for Knightmare
- Developer: Mindscape International Ltd.
- Publisher: Mindscape International Ltd.
- Designer: Antony Crowther
- Platforms: Amiga, Atari ST
- Release: 1991
- Genres: Role-playing video game Dungeon crawler
- Mode: Single-player

Knightmare is a computer game on the Amiga and Atari ST computer systems. It was released in 1991 by Mindscape International Ltd. The game was written by Tony Crowther. It is based on the Anglia Television TV show Knightmare.

This was the second of two games based on the show, following an earlier game - also known as Knightmare - released four years previously by Activision.

== Development ==
Knightmare is based on the CITV TV show of the same name, where a group of four children attempt to complete a quest. The format of the game differs from the TV show in that the view is in first person, in the TV show the main player had to wear a helmet to blind them to their surroundings. Knightmare was written by Tony Crowther, who also created the game Captive. Knightmare uses the same game engine as Captive and has some similarities. But unlike Captive where parts of the level were computer generated, all the dungeons in the game were designed by hand. Knightmare was published by Mindscape International Ltd. The player is required to complete four quests in order to gain the knowledge and ability to beat Lord Fear, the antagonist in the game. When developing the game, the developers travelled to Anglia Television studios to make use of the audio equipment when producing the sound for the game.

== Reception ==
Generally Knightmare was received well. Amiga Action and CU Amiga gave the game scores of 91% and 90%, but the game did not escape lower reviews, with Amiga Power rating the game at 75%. Critics drew attention to how similar Knightmare is to Captive. Amiga Action indicates that the quality of the game makes this less of an issue, while Amiga Power said the Captive game engine does not look as good as the Beholder game engine that's used in Eye of the Beholder 2. The general gameplay was praised, with the CU Amiga saying it is a game difficult to put down. Also praised was the quality of the sound in the game. The high quality sound requires 1MB of memory to work at its full settings, and the review said it is worth the upgrade. Amiga Action called the game absorbing. Amiga Format said the game starts out tough and only gets tougher. Amiga Power indicated that the game doesn't take any risks in the field of RPGs and feels like "role-playing by numbers".
