= Antony Crowther =

British computer game designer (born 1965)

- Born: 10 May 1965 (age 61); Sheffield, South Yorkshire, England
- Occupation: Software developer
- Known for: Commodore 64 games

Antony Crowther (born 10 May 1965) is a former designer, programmer, and musician of Commodore 64 games. During the 1980s he worked for Alligata, Gremlin Interactive and later his own company, Wizard Development.

== Career ==
The first computer game he created was a version of the board game Mastermind, which was written for the PET 4032. Following the acquisition of a VIC-20 Crowther began to learn machine code and wrote several games which he showed to software house Superior Systems. The company gave him a Commodore 64 on loan which he utilised to produce his first commercial title, Lunar Lander. He gained high status among C64 users in the mid 1980s with his highly prolific output, developing complete professional games in only two weeks. Crowther teamed up with fellow C64 musician, Ben Daglish, forming W.E.M.U.S.I.C., which stood for "We Make Use of Sound In Computers".

More recently, Crowther has worked on games for consoles such as the PlayStation and Xbox ranges.

== List of games ==
Year	Name	Platform	Publisher
1983	Aztec Tomb	C64	Alligata
1983	Bat Attack	C64	Alligata
1983	Bug Blaster	C64	Alligata
1983	Blagger	C64	Alligata
1983	Damsel in Distress	C64	Alligata
1984	Gryphon	C64	Quicksilva
1984	Killerwatt	C64	Alligata
1984	Loco	C64	Alligata
1984	Potty Pigeon	C64	Gremlin
1984	Wanted: Monty Mole	C64	Gremlin
1984	Son of Blagger	C64	Alligata
1985	Kettle	C64	Alligata
1985	Suicide Express	C64	Gremlin
1985	Trap	C64	Alligata
1985	Blagger Goes to Hollywood (music only)	C64	Alligata
1986	Black Thunder	C64	Quicksilva
1986	Killer Ring	C64	Ariolasoft
1986	William Wobbler	C64	Wizard Development
1987	Challenge of the Gobots	C64	Ariolasoft
1987	Centurions	C64	Ariolasoft
1987	Zig Zag	C64	Mirrorsoft
1988	Bombuzal	C64; Amiga; Atari ST; PC; Super Famicom/SNES	Mirrorsoft
1988	Fernandez Must Die	C64; Amiga; Atari ST	Mirrorsoft
1989	Phobia	C64; Amiga; Atari ST	Image Works
1990	Captive	Amiga; Atari ST; PC	Mindscape
1991	Captain Planet and the Planeteers	Amiga; Atari ST	Mindscape
1992	Knightmare	Amiga; Atari ST	Mindscape
1994	Liberation: Captive 2	Amiga; CD32	Mindscape
1996	Normality	PC	Gremlin
1997	Realms of the Haunting	PC	Gremlin
1998	N2O: Nitrous Oxide	PS	Gremlin
2000	Wacky Races	Dreamcast; PS2	Infogrames
2004	Harry Potter and the Prisoner of Azkaban	PC; PS2; Xbox; GameCube; GBA	Electronic Arts
2005	Battlefield 2: Modern Combat	PS2; Xbox; Xbox 360; PSP	Electronic Arts
2008	Burnout Paradise	PS3; Xbox 360; PC	Electronic Arts
2008	Zubo	DS	Electronic Arts
2009	Trivial Pursuit	PS2; PS3; Xbox 360; Wii; PC	Electronic Arts
2010	Harry Potter and the Deathly Hallows – Part 1	PS3; Xbox 360; Wii; PC	Electronic Arts
2011	Harry Potter and the Deathly Hallows – Part 2	PS3; Xbox 360; Wii; PC	Electronic Arts
