= Mark Knight (musician) =

British musician, video-game music composer and sound designer

- Also known as: TDK; Madfiddler
- Born: Brighton, East Sussex, England
- Genres: Chiptune; video game music
- Occupations: Composer; musician; sound designer
- Instruments: Electric violin; violin
- Years active: 1989–present
- Member of: K-Passa, The Sensible Band, T.D.K.
- Formerly of: Bleeding Hearts, Blue Horses, Tricks Upon Travellers
- Website: flitkillsmoths.co.uk; sonicfuel.co.uk; madfiddler.co.uk

Mark Knight, also known as TDK and Madfiddler, is a British musician, video-game music composer and sound designer. He started out writing chiptune and module-file music in the Amiga demoscene, and began his games-industry career as a composer in 1992. He continued until 2000 when he moved to sound design, and since 2014 has had a split role as a sound designer and composer culminating by going self employed in 2017.

== Biography ==
Born in 1973, in Brighton, East Sussex in England, his grandfather started teaching him the violin when he was 6. At 10 years old he was given a Commodore 64 home computer and took an interest in electronic music. Whilst studying in college he began writing music on the Amiga, releasing music within the demoscene. Having been refused a university place to study Music Production in 1992, he was given the opportunity to arrange the Wing Commander soundtrack to the Amiga home computer which led him to full-time employment with the developer Mindscape.

Having left Mindscape in 1997, Knight wrote the soundtrack for Duke Nukem: Total Meltdown before accepting a position at Bullfrog Productions, a development company owned by Electronic Arts, working on games such as Dungeon Keeper 2, Populous: The Beginning and Theme Park World – which won a BAFTA for Best Sound.

In 2000, Mark changed career direction and lead the sound-design team on the EA Sports F1 series, stating that "If truth be told however, it was a simple choice of either F1 or Harry Potter". He left EA in 2003, and after spending time at Visual Science he joined Codemasters in 2007 working on their DiRT, F1 and GRID franchises.

Knight has performed on the electric violin with the folk-punk band Tricks Upon Travellers (1994–2000), K-Passa (2000–2001, 2008–present), Blue Horses (2002–2003), 4-4-2 (2004), Laura Kenny (2006), Silver Dogs (2006–2007), Bleeding Hearts (2009–2011) and has worked as a session musician for bands such as Pepe Deluxé, The Divine Comedy, C64 Audio.com, and Frost*. He also administers the Fiddle and Alternative Strings Forum.

In 2012 Knight released his first TDK chiptune album, and continues to compose music in this style and in 2015 Knight announced his return to video-game composition with F1 2015. He was nominated for Best Western Game Composer (2015) at the Annual Game Music Awards.

Knight resigned from Codemasters in September 2017 and is now running his Audio Production company, SONiC FUEL.

He contributed demo music and patches to the Commodore 64 SID-chip emulator, inSIDious, from Impact Soundworks in 2020 and in 2021 he returned to the demoscene by contributing the music for the Melon Design demo, Cortez.

== Personal life ==
Knight lives in Warwickshire, England.

== Discography ==
=== Video games ===
Year	Title	Notes
1992	Guy Spy and the Crystals of Armageddon	
1992	Wing Commander	Amiga version
1992	Outlander	SNES version
1993	Mario's Time Machine	SNES version
1993	Alfred Chicken	With David Whittaker
1993	Pierre le Chef is... Out to Lunch	
1993	Battleship	
1993	D/Generation	
1993	Evasive Action	
1993	Liberation: Captive 2	
1993	Overkill/Lunar C	
1993	Out to Lunch	
1993	Sim Life	
1994	DragonLore	
1994	Sim City 2000	
1994	Battletoads	Amiga version
1995	Cyberspeed	
1996	Supersonic Racers	
1996	Warhammer: Shadow of the Horned Rat	With James Hannigan
1996	MegaRace 2	Special thanks
1997	Duke Nukem: Total Meltdown	
1998	Populous: The Beginning	
1998	Theme Park World	
1998	Warhammer: Dark Omen	
1999	Dungeon Keeper 2	
2000	Formula One 2000	
2000	Formula One 2000 CE	
2000	Superbikes 2000	
2001	Formula One 2001	
2001	Harry Potter and the Philosopher's Stone	
2001	Quake 3: Revolution	Audio Production
2002	Formula One 2002	Sound design
2002	Harry Potter and the Chamber of Secrets	Additional Sound Design and Dialogue Editing
2002	Shox	Technical Audio Lead
2003	Formula One 2003	
2003	Harry Potter: Quidditch World Cup	
2003	F1 Career Challenge	Audio lead
2004	Sudeki	Sound design
2007	Crysis	
2007	The Witcher	
2008	Metal Gear Solid Mobile	
2008	So Blonde	
2008	Race Driver: GRID	Audio lead
2009	Colin McRae: DiRT 2	Lead Audio Designer
2009	F1 2009	
2010	F1 2010	Lead Audio Sound Designer
2011	F1 2011	Lead Audio Sound Designer
2011	DiRT 3	Lead Audio Designer
2011	Dizzy Prince of the Yolkfolk	
2011	FortressCraft	With Arjan Kroes
2012	DiRT Showdown	Audio Group Lead
2012	F1 2012	Audio Group Lead
2012	F1 Race Stars	Group Lead Audio Designer
2013	GRID 2	
2013	Colin McRae Rally	Special thanks
2013	F1 2013	Audio Group Lead
2014	F1 2014	
2014	GRID Autosport	Group Lead Audio Designer
2014	Toybox Turbos	Additional Composer
2015	F1 2015	Audio Group Lead and Composer
2015	Dirt Rally	Group Lead Audio Designer
2015	Overlord: Fellowship of Evil	With Michiel van den Bos
2015	D/Generation HD	Composer
2016	F1 2016	Principal Audio Designer and Composer
2016	Shadow Warrior 2	Instrumentalists & Vocals
2016	Micro Machines	Additional Composer
2017	F1 2017	Composer
2017	Flight Sim World	Composer
2017	Funfair.io	Composer/Sound Designer
2018–present	BeamNG.drive	Audio Designer
2019	NASCAR Heat 4	Audio Designer
2020	NASCAR Heat 5	Uncredited use of 2019 audio
2021	Turbo Tomato	Composer
2022	World of Outlaws	Audio Designer
2025	Assetto Corsa Rally	Audio Director
Unreleased	Carmageddon TV	
Unreleased	.ComBots	
Unreleased	Mario's Mission Earth	
Unreleased	Road Rash	
Unreleased	Velocity	

=== Music releases ===
- Cyberspeed Unleashed (2011)
- FortressCraft Credits (2011)
- Reawakening (2012)
- D/Generation HD (2015)
- The General (2019)
- Project Hubbard: Escape to New Rob (2019)
- ME! (2019)
- Retrospect (2020)

=== Violin sessions ===
- 4-4-2 – Come on England
- Bjørn Lynne – The Gods Awaken
- C64Audio – Back in Time 3
- Frost* – The Dividing Line
- Frost* – Falling Satellites
- James J Turner – How Could We Be Wrong?
- Ian Livingstone – Big Fat Gypsy Weddings
- K-Passa – Born Again
- Michał Cielecki - Shadow Warrior 2
- Pepe Deluxe – Beatitude
- Press Play on Tape – Home Computer
- SilverDogs – SilverDogs
- The Divine Comedy – Casanova
- The Giallos Flame – House at the Edge of the Dark
- This Morning Call – Deserted
- Tomorrows Ancestor – Live at Stainsby
- Tricks Upon Travellers – The Last Fish Supper
- Tricks Upon Travellers – Where the Skeletons Dance
- Tricks Upon Travellers – Acoustic Live and Uncut
