= Boris Zhukov =

American professional wrestler (born 1959)

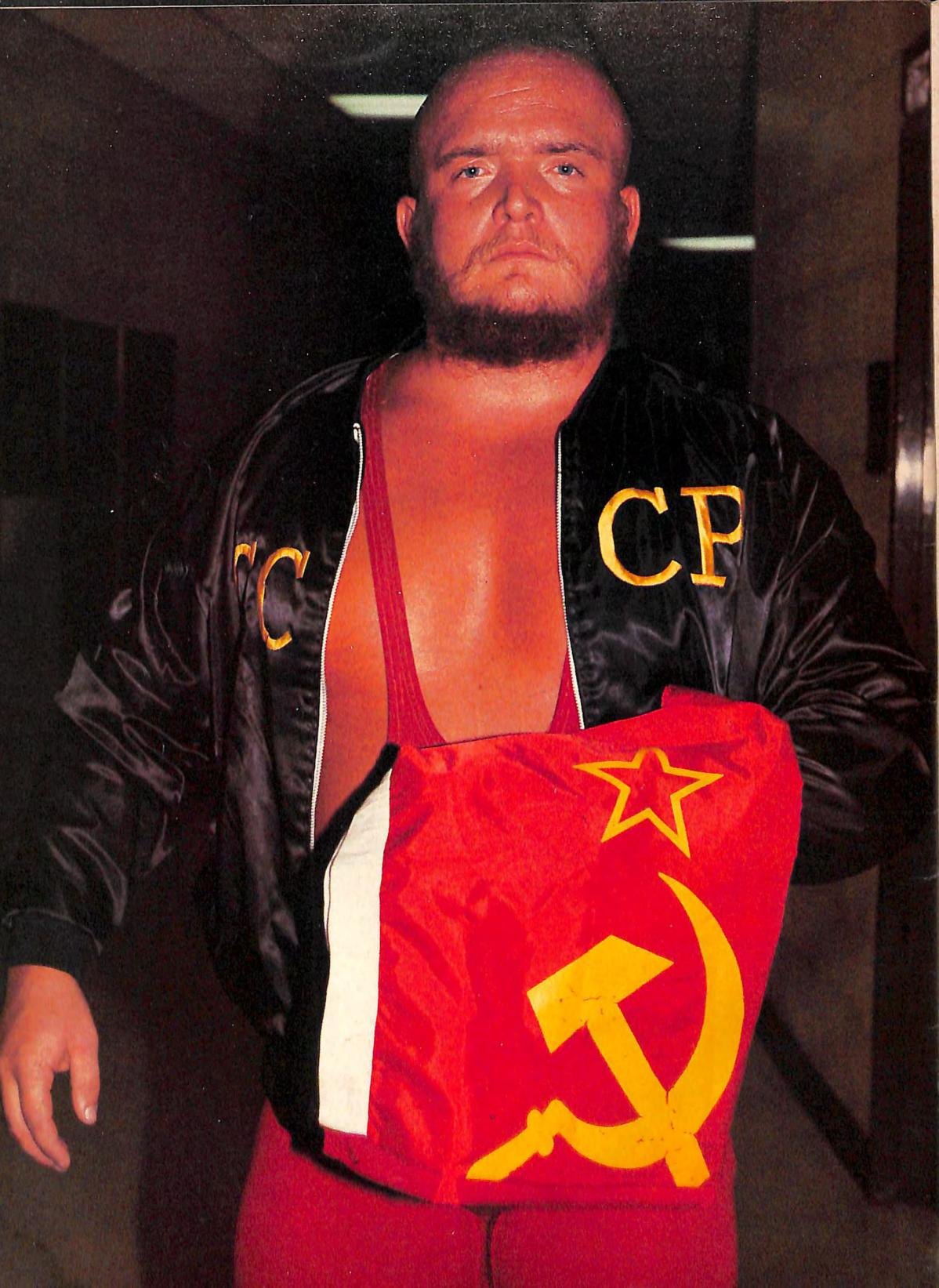
- Zhukov in 1986

Personal information
- Born: James Kirk Harrell; January 29, 1959 (age 67) Roanoke, Virginia, U.S.

Professional wrestling career
- Ring name(s): Boris Zhukov; Boris Zurhkov; Jason; Jim Nelson; Mr. Russia; Private Jim Nelson
- Billed height: 6 ft 2 in (188 cm)
- Billed weight: 254 lb (115 kg)
- Billed from: Soviet Union; Siberia
- Trained by: Don Hogan; Steve Savage
- Debut: May 18, 1978
- Retired: 2012

James Kirk Harrell (born January 29, 1959) is an American retired professional wrestler. He is best known for his appearances with the American Wrestling Association (AWA) and the World Wrestling Federation (WWF) under the ring name Boris Zhukov, as well as his appearances with Jim Crockett Promotions as Private Jim Nelson.

== Professional wrestling career ==
=== Early career (1978–1980) ===
Inspired by his Northside High School football coach and hope to become a pro wrestler, 160-pound wide receiver and defensive halfback Harrell became interested in gaining mass in his senior year, 1977. While exercising at a YMCA, he met Ric McCord, who introduced him to Don Hogan and Steve Savage, two wrestlers from Salem, Virginia who trained him. After wrestling in Virginia in a tag team, Harrell moved to Atlanta, Georgia. In his first big match, the 210-pound Harrell (now called Jim Nelson) teamed with Mike Stallings to lose to Ivan Koloff and Ole Anderson.

=== Jim Crockett Promotions (1980–1983) ===
Harrell debuted in Jim Crockett Promotions in August 1980, wrestling as "Jim Nelson". In December 1981, Harrell adopted the name "Private Jim Nelson" and joined Sgt. Slaughter's villainous "Cobra Corps". He formed a tag team with fellow Corps member Don Kernodle. In May 1982, Nelson and Kernodle defeated Jay Youngblood and Porkchop Cash to win the NWA Mid-Atlantic Tag Team Championship. The team lost the title to Cash and Iceman Parsons in June, but regained it, later that month. The teams second reign lasted until August 1982 when they lost to Youngblood and Ricky Steamboat. In early 1983, Harrell left the Cobra Corps and began feuding with Slaughter and Kernodle, losing to Kernodle in a series of "boot camp matches" in April and May. He left Jim Crockett Promotions in May 1983.

=== Mid-South Wrestling (1983) ===
In May 1983, Harrell joined the Louisiana-based Mid-South Wrestling promotion as "Boris Zurhkov". This is where he became a "Russian", shaved his head and grew a beard. He left the promotion in September 1983.

=== World Class Wrestling Association (1983) ===
In August 1983, Harrell began wrestling for the Dallas, Texas-based World Class Championship Wrestling promotion. He adopted the character of "Boris Zurkov", a mercenary hired by Skandor Akbar to face Bruiser Brody. He left the promotion in December 1983.

=== Southeastern Championship Wrestling (1984, 1985) ===
In January 1984, Harrell debuted in the Birmingham, Alabama-based Southeastern Championship Wrestling promotion as "Boris Zhukov". He feuded with wrestlers including Jacques Rougeau, Jimmy Golden, and Rick McGraw. In August 1984, Harrell defeated McGraw for the NWA Alabama Heavyweight Championship. He lost the title to Porkchop Cash the following month. He left the promotion in October 1984.

Harrell returned to the promotion the following March, this time wrestling under a mask as "Mr. Russia". He left the next month after losing a mask versus mask Lights Out match to Mr. Olympia.

=== American Wrestling Association (1985–1987) ===
In April 1985, Harrell debuted in the Minneapolis, Minnesota-based American Wrestling Association as "Boris Zukhov", adopting Chris Markoff as his manager. During 1985, he unsuccessfully challenged AWA World Heavyweight Champion Rick Martel and AWA America's Champion Sgt. Slaughter.

In early 1986, Harrell formed a tag team with Nord the Barbarian. The duo occasionally teamed with other foreign heels such as The Mongolian Stomper and Adnan Al-Kaissie. After the tag team dissolved in August 1986, Harrell unsuccessfully challenged AWA World Heavyweight Champion Nick Bockwinkel on several occasions.

In April 1987, Harrell formed another tag team with Soldat Ustinov, winning a tag team tournament. The following month, they defeated The Midnight Rockers for the AWA World Tag Team Championship. In September 1987, Harrell left the AWA to join the World Wrestling Federation, with the explanation given being that Wahoo McDaniel had driven him out of the promotion after a brutal chain match.

=== World Wrestling Federation (1987–1991) ===
Harrell debuted in the World Wrestling Federation in October 1987, once again performing as "Boris Zhukov". In fact, he legally changed his name to Boris Zhukov at this time in order to retain the legal rights to the name. He formed a villainous tag team with fellow pseudo-Russian Nikolai Volkoff (whose previous tag partner The Iron Sheik had just been fired by the WWF) known as "The Bolsheviks". Over the following 15 months, The Bolsheviks competed against teams such as The British Bulldogs, The Killer Bees, The Powers of Pain, The Rougeau Brothers, and The Young Stallions. Both men entered the 1988 Royal Rumble, which was won by Jim Duggan. In October 1988, Zhukov took part in the King of the Ring tournament, losing to Mike Sharpe in the first round. That same month the Bolsheviks unsuccessfully challenged fellow heels Demolition for the WWF World Tag Team Championship in a match, later released on a Demolition VHS compilation, where the crowds cheered Demolition who turned babyface a month later at the Survivor Series after teaming with the Bolsheviks.

The Bolsheviks separated in early 1989 after Volkoff temporarily departed the WWF, with Zhukov competing as a single wrestler. His regular opponents included Paul Roma, Ronnie Garvin, and Tim Horner. In September 1989, Volkoff returned to the WWF and reformed their tag team. In December 1989, The Bolsheviks began a lengthy series of matches with The Bushwhackers. At WrestleMania VI in April 1990, The Bolsheviks lost to The Hart Foundation in a squash. and days later again failed to capture the World tag team title from Demolition in another squash.

The Bolsheviks permanently disbanded in May 1990 after a further crushing defeat by the Rockers, with Volkoff turning face by embracing America and feuding with Zhukov. After the feud ended in August 1990, Zhukov faced Koko B. Ware in a series of matches. At Survivor Series 1990, Zhukov teamed with his former Cobra Corps partner Sgt. Slaughter plus "The Orient Express" (Sato, and Tanaka) as "The Mercenaries", losing to "The Alliance" (Volkoff, The Bushwhackers, and Tito Santana).

Zhukov left the WWF in February 1991.

=== Late career (1991–2001, 2007–2012) ===
In January 1991, Harrell made a brief tour of Japan with the Super World of Sports promotion.

In April 1991, Harrell began wrestling for the Universal Wrestling Federation in Florida and New York. He made his final appearance in June 1991 at the Beach Brawl pay-per-view in Palmetto, Florida, defeating Paul Samson.

After leaving the UWF, Harrell wrestled sporadically over the following decade. He formally retired in 2001.

In 2007, Zhukov resurfaced as a heel in Virginia-based promotion American Championship Wrestling (ACW) and allied with local heel Eclipso. He was attacked and injured, leading to a face turn and a "Wrestle or Retire" match on September 8 for Eclipso's ACW Championship. Before the match, Zhukov told the crowd he was retiring, but a replacement had been chosen. Later that night, his old persona, Pvt. Jim Nelson (who had not been seen since an assault by Jack & Gerry Brisco in 1983) was revealed as that replacement. Now clean-shaven and dressed in army camouflage, he'd redone Sgt. Slaughter's boot camp and was promoted to Sgt. Jim Nelson in a pre-match ceremony. Nelson won the match and title after interference from both managers. Due to the controversy, the title was held up.

Zhukov last match was on October 6, 2012, losing to Colonel Spud Wade.

== Personal life ==
In July 2016, Zhukov was named part of a class action lawsuit filed against WWE which alleged that wrestlers incurred traumatic brain injuries during their tenure and that the company concealed the risks of injury. The suit was litigated by attorney Konstantine Kyros, who has been involved in a number of other lawsuits against WWE. The lawsuit was dismissed by US District Judge Vanessa Lynne Bryant in September 2018.

== Championships and accomplishments ==
- American Wrestling Association
  - AWA World Tag Team Championship (1 time) - with Soldat Ustinov
- Maple Leaf Wrestling
  - NWA Canadian Television Championship (2 times)
- Mid-Atlantic Championship Wrestling
  - NWA Mid-Atlantic Tag Team Championship (2 times) - with Don Kernodle
- Pro Wrestling Illustrated
  - PWI ranked him No. 360 of the 500 best singles wrestlers of the year in the PWI 500 in 1991
- Southeastern Championship Wrestling
  - NWA Alabama Heavyweight Championship (1 time)
- Wrestling Observer Newsletter
  - Worst Feud of the Year (1985) vs. Sgt. Slaughter
  - Worst Tag Team (1988) with Nikolai Volkoff
- World Wrestling Federation
  - Slammy Award (1 time)
    - Best Personal Hygiene (1987) with Nikolai Volkoff and Slick
