= Sgt. Slaughter =

American professional wrestler (born 1948)

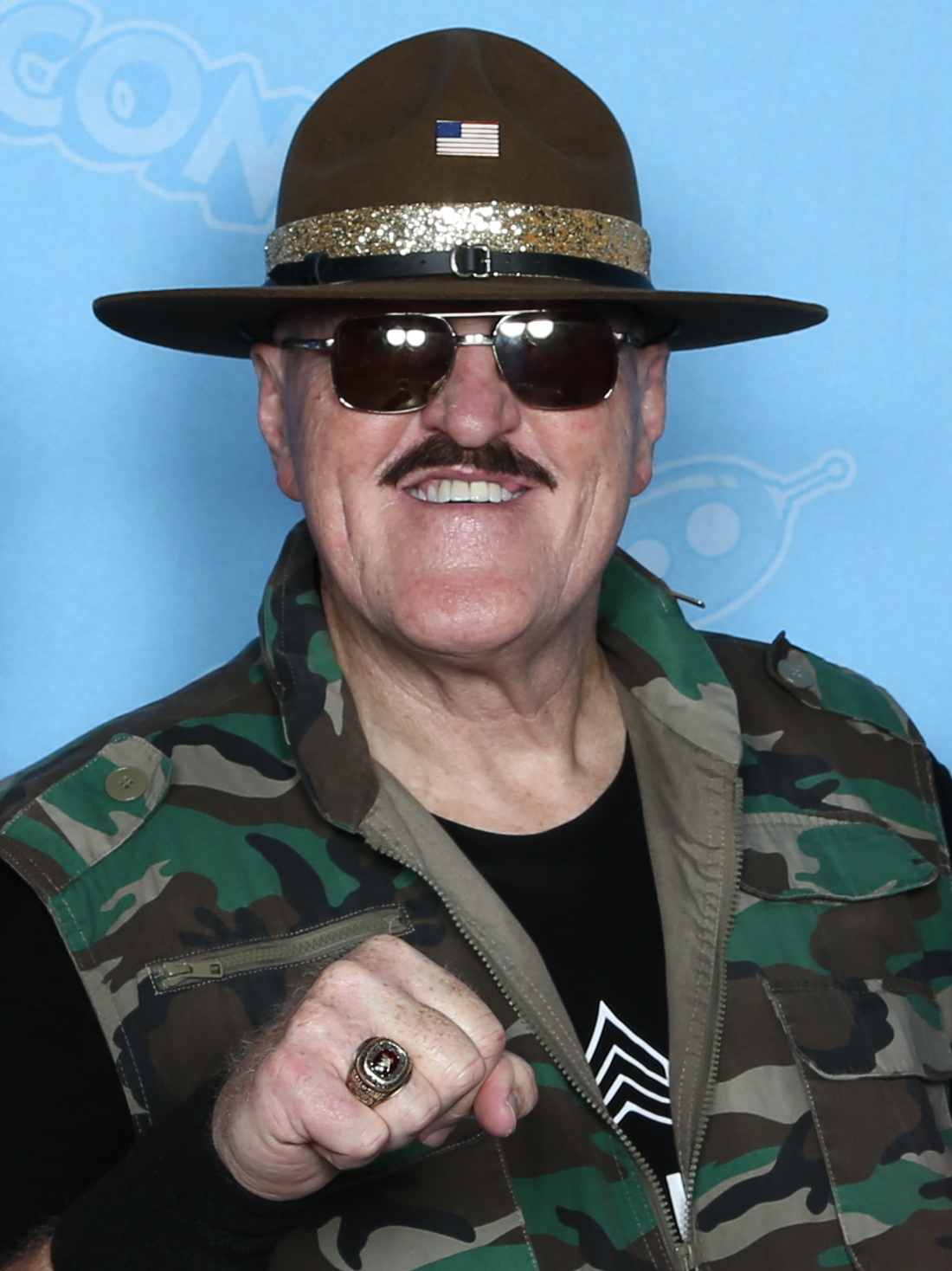
- Slaughter in 2022

Personal information
- Born: Robert Rudolph Remus; August 27, 1948 (age 78) Detroit, Michigan, U.S.

Professional wrestling career
- Ring name(s): Bob Remus; Bob Slaughter; The Executioner; Sgt. Slaughter; Super Destroyer Mark II; Matt Burns
- Billed height: 6 ft 6 in (198 cm)
- Billed weight: 310 lb (141 kg)
- Billed from: Parris Island, South Carolina
- Trained by: Verne Gagne
- Debut: 1972
- Retired: 2014

Robert Rudolph Remus (born August 27, 1948), better known as Sgt. Slaughter, is an American actor and retired professional wrestler. He is signed to WWE in its ambassador program.

From the late 1970s to the early 1990s, Slaughter had success in the National Wrestling Alliance (NWA), American Wrestling Association (AWA), and the World Wrestling Federation (WWF). He won the WWF Heavyweight Championship and headlined WrestleMania VII in 1991. Slaughter also captured the NWA United States Heavyweight Championship twice. He is a WWE Hall of Famer, inducted as part of the class of 2004. He had the Wrestling Observer Newsletter Match of the Year twice in 1981 vs Pat Patterson, and in 1983 in a tag team match with Don Kernodle vs. Ricky Steamboat and Jay Youngblood. He was inducted into the Professional Wrestling Hall of Fame in 2016 and the Wrestling Observer Newsletter Hall of Fame in 2023.

As Sgt. Slaughter, Remus became known for his dark sunglasses, his campaign hat, and his Vietnam War-era military fatigues. In the 1980s, an alternate version of the Sgt. Slaughter character was incorporated into the G.I. Joe: A Real American Hero toy line as well as its animated series and comic books.

Sgt. Slaughter's gimmick is that of a former U.S. Marine who was a drill instructor and fought in the Vietnam War. Remus himself never served in the military. Remus' usage of U.S. Marine Corps uniforms, emblems, and insignia, as well as claiming to be a war veteran while seemingly speaking as himself, has periodically drawn ire. In 2024, Remus addressed these controversies and stated he would never use Vietnam stories again.

== Early life ==
Robert Rudolph Remus was born on August 27, 1948, in Detroit, Michigan, and grew up on a farm in Minnesota. At a young age, he became a fan of professional wrestling after watching it on television with his father. He attended Eden Prairie High School in nearby Eden Prairie, where he wrestled and played football, graduating in 1966.

== Professional wrestling career ==
=== Early career (1972–1980) ===
After training with Verne Gagne and Billy Robinson in Minnesota in 1972, he began working for the American Wrestling Association (AWA) under his real name. He wrestled as "Beautiful" Bobby Remus, competing in Portland and Vancouver. Remus held numerous regional titles early in his career and experienced major success in the National Wrestling Alliance (NWA). However, he briefly stopped wrestling when his mother was diagnosed with cancer, going back home to run his father's roofing company.

During his time off, Remus came up with the gimmick of a drill sergeant, Sgt. Slaughter, inspired by the 1957 film The D.I. and named after Jackie Gleason's character from the 1963 film Soldier in the Rain. He pitched the idea to Gagne, who liked the idea as it reminded him of his own drill instructor. Harley Race then called Remus to compete as Bob Slaughter in Kansas City.

In 1978, Remus returned to the AWA under a mask as Super Destroyer Mark II. He was initially managed by Lord Alfred Hayes, whom he dismissed and replaced with Bobby Heenan, leading to a feud between the two managers with Hayes as the babyface.

=== World Wrestling Federation (1980–1981) ===
In 1980, Sgt. Slaughter signed with the WWF after receiving a call from Vincent J. McMahon and was pushed as a villainous character. Under the guidance of the Grand Wizard, he quickly rose to the status of number one contender on the strength of his "cobra clutch" challenges where he would seat wrestlers in a chair in the ring and apply the hold, offering $5,000 to anyone who could break it. He would eventually face Bob Backlund for the WWF World Heavyweight Championship across the WWF territory in 1980, earning two-of-three falls main event matches in most markets, but failed to win the title. He also wrestled Bruno Sammartino in his final match in Madison Square Garden.

Slaughter then engaged in a feud with Pat Patterson, which stemmed from Slaughter calling Patterson "yellow" and offering him $10,000 (double the usual amount) to try to break the cobra clutch. Patterson accepted on television and was escaping from the hold when Slaughter released it and put a beat-down on Patterson. This started a hot feud that culminated in an "Alley Fight" between the two in Madison Square Garden, which has been described as "one of the most brutal and bloody matches in WWE history". The match ended when the Grand Wizard threw in the towel, awarding Patterson the victory.

=== National Wrestling Alliance, Catch Wrestling Association (1981–1983) ===
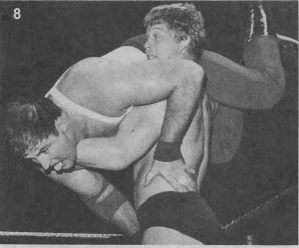
Slaughter getting thrown by Bob Backlund during a match, c. 1980–81

In September 1981, Slaughter joined the NWA for its flagship territory Jim Crockett Promotions (JCP). The following month, he won a tournament to determine a new NWA United States Heavyweight Champion, defeating Ricky Steamboat in the finals for the vacant title. He would hold the title for over seven months, before losing the title to Wahoo McDaniel in May 1982. In September, Slaughter and partner Don Kernodle were awarded the NWA World Tag Team Championship, claiming a title victory over Antonio Inoki and Giant Baba in Tokyo. They were involved in a heated rivalry with the team of Steamboat and Jay Youngblood, who defeated them for the titles in a steel cage match on March 12, 1983. Following the rivalry, Slaughter left JCP.

During this period, Slaughter also toured Germany and Austria for the Catch Wrestling Association (CWA), twice unsuccessfully challenging CWA World Heavyweight Champion Otto Wanz.

=== Return to WWF (1983–1984) ===
Slaughter returned to the WWF in March 1983, immediately targeting Backlund, who was still the reigning WWF World Heavyweight Champion. Their feud heightened when, at a television taping, Slaughter attacked Backlund while he was in the process of completing the Harvard step test, hitting him repeatedly with his riding crop and leaving bruises on his back. Although he won several matches by disqualification, he never won the title.

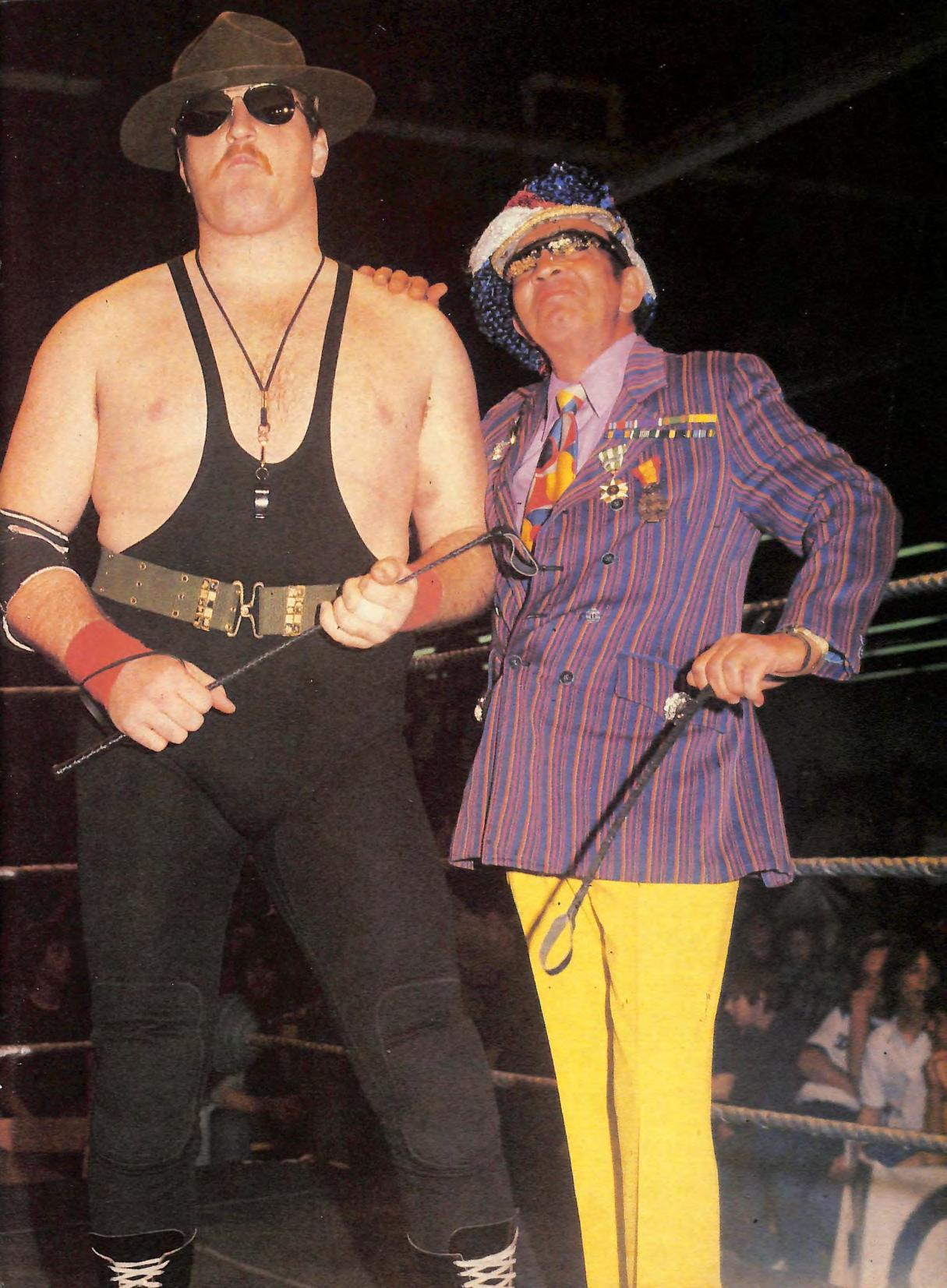
Slaughter (left) and The Grand Wizard (right) in 1982

In early 1984, Slaughter's career took off after he turned face and defended America's honor against The Iron Sheik from Iran, leading to a series of matches between the two. They had many matches throughout the year, culminating in a boot camp match that took place before a sold-out Madison Square Garden that summer.

On Vince McMahon's DVD, McMahon, Slaughter said he was fired by McMahon in Toronto after no-showing an event in protest of McMahon's refusal to give him six weeks of paid vacation. Other interviews with Slaughter and McMahon have revealed that Slaughter left the company more over a dispute that emerged due to the WWF not allowing Slaughter's role in the G.I. Joe toy line.

=== American Wrestling Association (1985–1990) ===
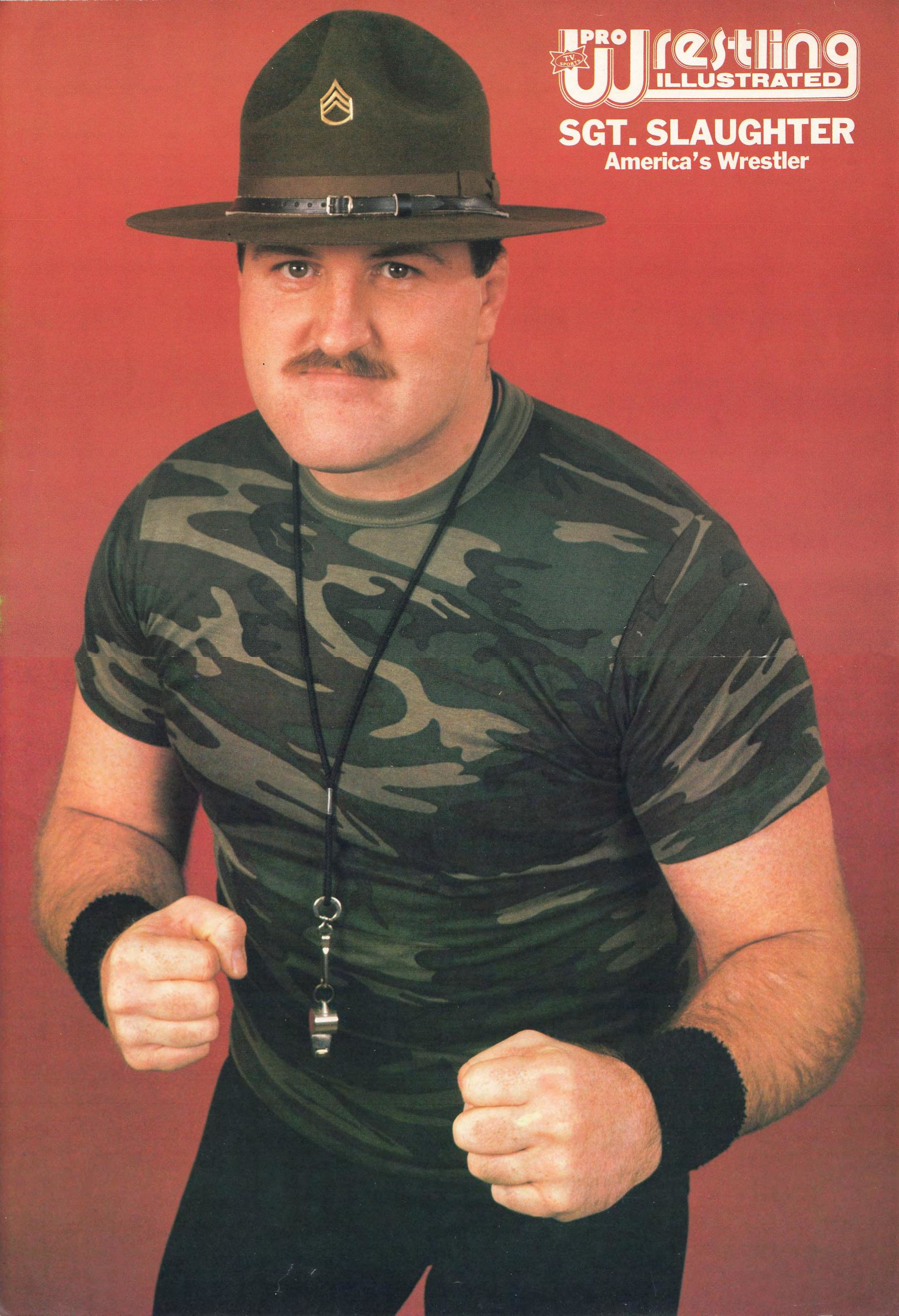
Slaughter in a 1985 promotional photo

He received a considerable push in the AWA throughout 1985 and 1986, becoming the AWA America's Heavyweight Champion by defeating Larry Zbyszko shortly after his debut. Sports editor and columnist Lew Freedman wrote of Slaughter's popularity in the wake of his face turn in August 1985: "Talk about your overnight sensations. Slaughter had been wrestling for 10 years and suddenly he was hotter than Dwight Gooden". He defended the title against wrestlers like Zbyszko, Kamala, Boris Zukhov and Nick Bockwinkel (before the belt was retired) and feuded with Sheik Adnan Al-Kaissey and his stable of wrestlers, the Road Warriors and Colonel DeBeers. He was also involved in the short-lived Pro Wrestling USA promotion, winning a 25-man battle royal for the right to challenge Ric Flair for the NWA World Heavyweight Championship, which he did not win.

In 1988, Slaughter returned to wrestling in the AWA, resuming some of his past feuds with the likes of Al-Kaissey, the Iron Sheik and DeBeers. At the SuperClash III pay-per-view on December 13, he defeated DeBeers in a Boot Camp match. He became a top contender to the AWA World Heavyweight Championship during Zbyszko's reign in 1989 and was a team captain for the AWA's ill-fated Team Challenge Series during the first half of 1990. The AWA teased fans with Slaughter appearing to win the world title from Zbyszko live on ESPN, only to have the decision reversed on a technicality (a booking practice the AWA had been employing for years).

=== Second return to the WWF (1990–1994) ===
==== Iraqi sympathizer (1990–1991) ====
In June 1990, Slaughter returned to the WWF as a heel. The August 1990 invasion of Kuwait by Ba'athist Iraq triggered a political crisis that would lead to the 1991 Gulf War, in which Kuwait was freed by a U.S.-led military coalition. A decision was made to have Slaughter support the Iraqi cause, not for the actual political reasons, but more for the fact that Slaughter liked "brutality" and the Iraqi government was "brutal" while the United States regime was said by Slaughter to have become "soft" and "weak". Slaughter aligned himself with an Iraqi enthusiast and kayfabe Iraqi military general, General Adnan (his old rival who left the AWA shortly after Slaughter did). They entered a feud with Volkoff, with Slaughter winning the majority of their encounters at house shows. On November 22, at Survivor Series, The Alliance (Volkoff, Tito Santana and The Bushwhackers) defeated The Mercenaries (Slaughter, Boris Zhukov and The Orient Express). As part of his character change, Slaughter began wearing Arab headdresses to the ring, adopted the camel clutch as one of his finishers, and was (kayfabe) photographed meeting with Saddam Hussein. While portraying a turncoat, Slaughter and his family received numerous death threats and he could not go anywhere in public without wearing a bullet-proof vest, having to be surrounded with security personnel at all times.

By the end of the year, Slaughter set his sights on the WWF Championship, held by Ultimate Warrior. At the Royal Rumble on January 19, 1991, days after the Gulf War air campaign had begun, Slaughter defeated the Warrior to win the WWF Championship after interference from "Macho King" Randy Savage. He was immediately challenged by Royal Rumble winner Hulk Hogan, who was furious that Slaughter had (kayfabe) desecrated the American flag (off-screen) as part of his victory celebration. Hogan demanded a match against Slaughter at WrestleMania VII on March 24 in Los Angeles, California, where Slaughter lost the WWF Championship to Hogan. After WrestleMania, Slaughter introduced his newest ally, Colonel Mustafa (his old nemesis The Iron Sheik), teaming with him and Adnan in a three-on-two handicap match against Hogan and Warrior at SummerSlam on August 26, which they lost.

==== Various feuds (1991–1994) ====
After the Hogan feud, Slaughter became a face again, appearing in vignettes next to American landmarks, saying "I want my country back". During an episode of Superstars, Jim Duggan was under attack from The Nasty Boys, and Slaughter made the save. At WrestleMania VIII on April 5, Slaughter, Duggan, Big Boss Man and Virgil defeated The Nasty Boys, The Mountie and Repo Man. He would also feud with Adnan and Mustafa, with Slaughter and Mustafa being on opposite teams at Survivor Series on November 27; Slaughter's team was victorious. At Royal Rumble on January 19, 1992, he competed in the Royal Rumble match, but was eliminated by Sid. Slaughter spent the remainder of the year on the house show circuit, suffering a string of losses against The Mountie. Late in the year, Slaughter retired from full-time competition and started appearing as an on-air official until June 1994.

=== Third return to the WWF (1997–2009) ===
==== WWF Commissioner and sporadic appearances (1997–2009) ====
After a hiatus, he returned to WWF television on the August 4, 1997 episode of Raw Is War to assume the role of on-air commissioner by (kayfabe) President Gorilla Monsoon. He eventually became the target of Shawn Michaels and Triple H of D-Generation X (DX), who called him "Sgt. Slobber". Slaughter lost to Triple H in a Boot Camp match at D-Generation X: In Your House on December 7. In early 1998, Slaughter turned heel, joined Vince McMahon along with Gerald Brisco and Pat Patterson, and became the on-screen lackeys of McMahon; running errands for him and dishing out punishment to McMahon's rivals, namely Steve Austin. His feud with Triple H continued into WrestleMania XIV on March 29, where he handcuffed himself to Chyna to prevent her from interfering with Helmsley's match against Owen Hart. Slaughter's efforts ultimately proved futile, as Chyna threw powder into his eyes and hurled Slaughter into the front row. Later that year, Slaughter relinquished the role of commissioner to Shawn Michaels and disappeared from television. Slaughter made an appearance at WrestleMania X-Seven on April 1, 2001, in the gimmick battle royal, which was won by The Iron Sheik.

On the November 24, 2003 episode of Raw, Slaughter lost to Randy Orton, who was establishing himself as the "Legend Killer". On the January 31, 2005 episode of Raw, he lost to (kayfabe) Saudi Arabian wrestler Muhammad Hassan. He made a special appearance on the June 13 episode of Raw to challenge Chris Masters in his "Master Lock Challenge", which Slaughter lost. He returned again on the December 5 episode of Raw, where he and Michael Hayes confronted Edge. In mid-2006, he hosted a "Diva Boot Camp" segment as part of the 2006 Diva Search Competition.

He re-appeared on the October 2 episode of Raw, defeating Nicky from the Spirit Squad with a roll-up when D-Generation X (DX) distracted him from up on the TitanTron. Slaughter appeared on the October 23 episode of Raw in the corner of Ric Flair as he faced Kenny of the Spirit Squad. After Kenny cheated to gain the victory, Slaughter, Dusty Rhodes and Roddy Piper cleared the tag champions from the ring. Slaughter was one of three options between himself, Piper and Rhodes that fans could vote for as Flair's tag partner at Cyber Sunday, but he did not win the vote. At Survivor Series on November 26, Slaughter teamed with Flair, Rhodes and Ron Simmons to take on four members of the Spirit Squad in a Survivor Series match. Slaughter was eliminated in the match, but his team won with Flair as the sole survivor.

At Vengeance: Night of Champions on June 24, 2007, Slaughter and Jimmy Snuka faced Deuce 'n Domino for the WWE Tag Team Championship in a losing effort. He faced Orton again in a losing effort on the July 30 episode of Raw, and was wheeled out on a stretcher following a post-match assault by Orton. On the 15th-anniversary Raw special on December 10, Slaughter participated in the 15th-anniversary battle royal. Slaughter, who had been working as a producer for WWE for the past several years, was released from his backstage producer duties with the company on January 13, 2009.

=== Later Career (1994–2014) ===
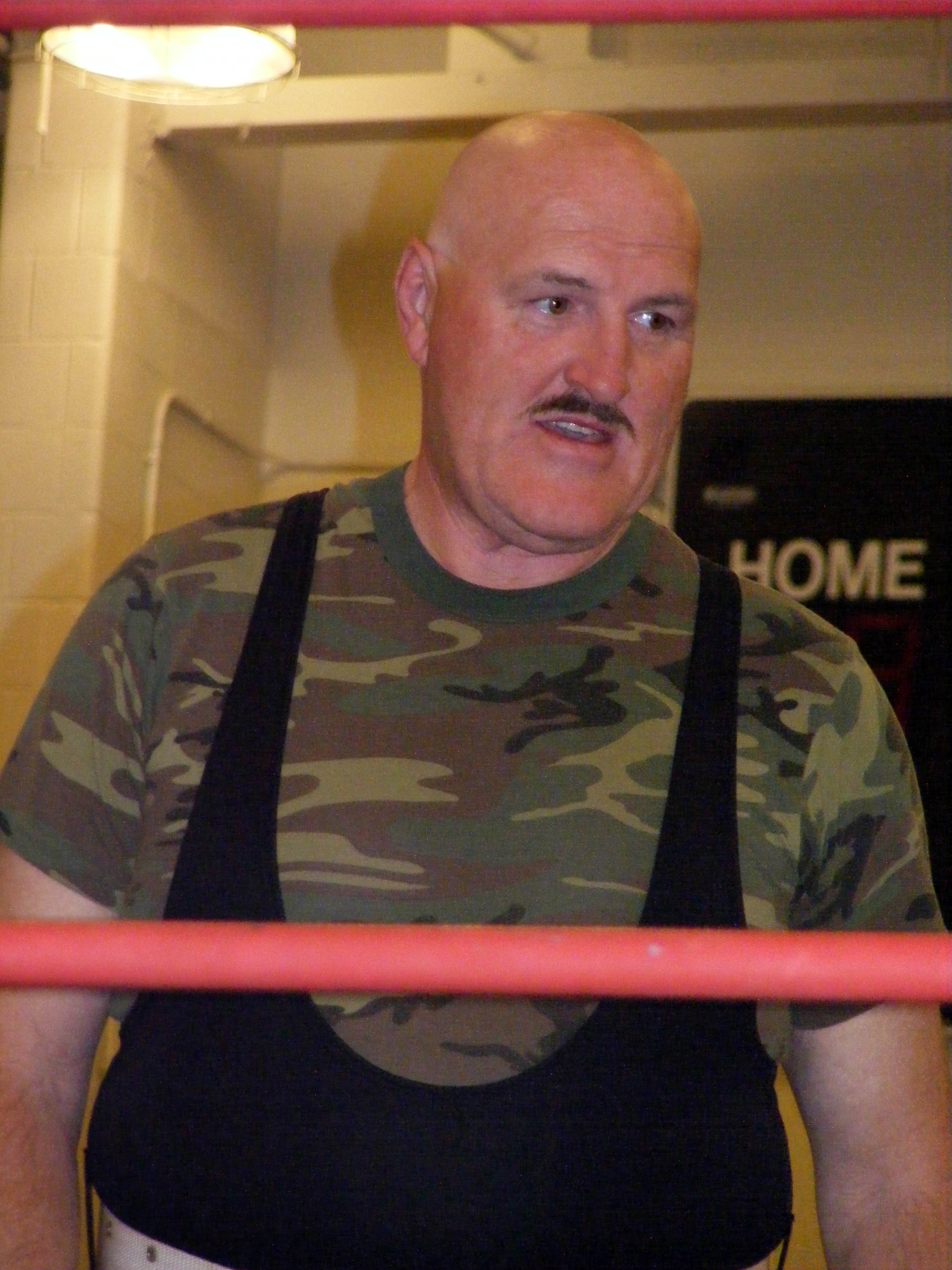
Slaughter in an April 2009 match without his trademark hat and glasses

His first appearance on the independent circuit was in the American Wrestling Federation (AWF) in 1994 until the promotion closed down in October 1996. On October 16, 1999, he defeated Bob Backlund at USA Pro in New York City. He appeared for Northeast Wrestling (NEW) at Renegades Rampage on October 2, 2004, defeating King Kong Bundy. Slaughter appeared for the International Wrestling Cartel (IWC) at their Night of Legends 2 event on April 9, 2005, defeating The Honky Tonk Man. On May 26, 2006, Slaughter defeated The Warlord at the Empire Wrestling Federation (EWF) event Pro Wrestling Legends. On March 28, 2009, he defeated his former rival Kamala at that year's IWC Night of Legends event. Slaughter teamed with The Patriot to defeat the Nigerian Nightmares at an NWA New Jersey show on December 2, 2011. He returned to Northeast Wrestling for his last two matches; he teamed with Jeff Starr to defeat Dalton Castle and Jake Manning in Slaughter's final match on March 29, 2014.

=== Fourth return to WWE (2009–present) ===
Slaughter was the special guest host of Raw on August 10, 2009. He made an appearance on the October 2 Decade of SmackDown in a backstage segment with the Iron Sheik. Slaughter would appear on the November 15, 2010 episode of Raw as the show went old school, losing to Alberto Del Rio. He also quickly lost to Jack Swagger on the June 27, 2011 episode of Raw. On the July 3, 2012 episode of SmackDown, Slaughter, Jim Duggan and Santino Marella defeated Drew McIntyre, Hunico and Camacho. On the December 31 edition of Raw, he unsuccessfully challenged Antonio Cesaro for the WWE United States Championship in his final match for WWE.

On the January 6, 2014 episode of Raw, he served as the special guest referee for a match between The Great Khali and Damien Sandow. Slaughter's next appearance was on the November 24 episode of Raw, where he confronted United States Champion Rusev and his valet, Lana, and attempted to force them to recite the Pledge of Allegiance (with the alternative, per an edict from Daniel Bryan, who was running the show that night, being that he would be forced to defend his title against the entire Raw roster). Rusev refused and had a staredown with Slaughter, who stood his ground. Swagger and his manager, Zeb Colter, ran down to the ring and fended Rusev off. Swagger, Colter and Slaughter then finished reciting the Pledge of Allegiance. Slaughter returned at Tribute to the Troops on December 17, helping Dean Ambrose defeat Bray Wyatt by giving Dean his steel-toe boot to use on Wyatt.

At Money in the Bank on June 18, 2017, Slaughter and several other legends were shown at ringside during the WWE Championship match between Jinder Mahal and Randy Orton. Slaughter's next appearance was at Raw Reunion on July 22, 2019. He was in attendance at the February 5, 2020 episode of NXT. On January 4, 2021, Slaughter made an appearance on the Legends Night special episode of Raw.

On July 25, 2025, he made an appearance on SmackDown during the tribute to Hulk Hogan.

== G.I. Joe and other media ==
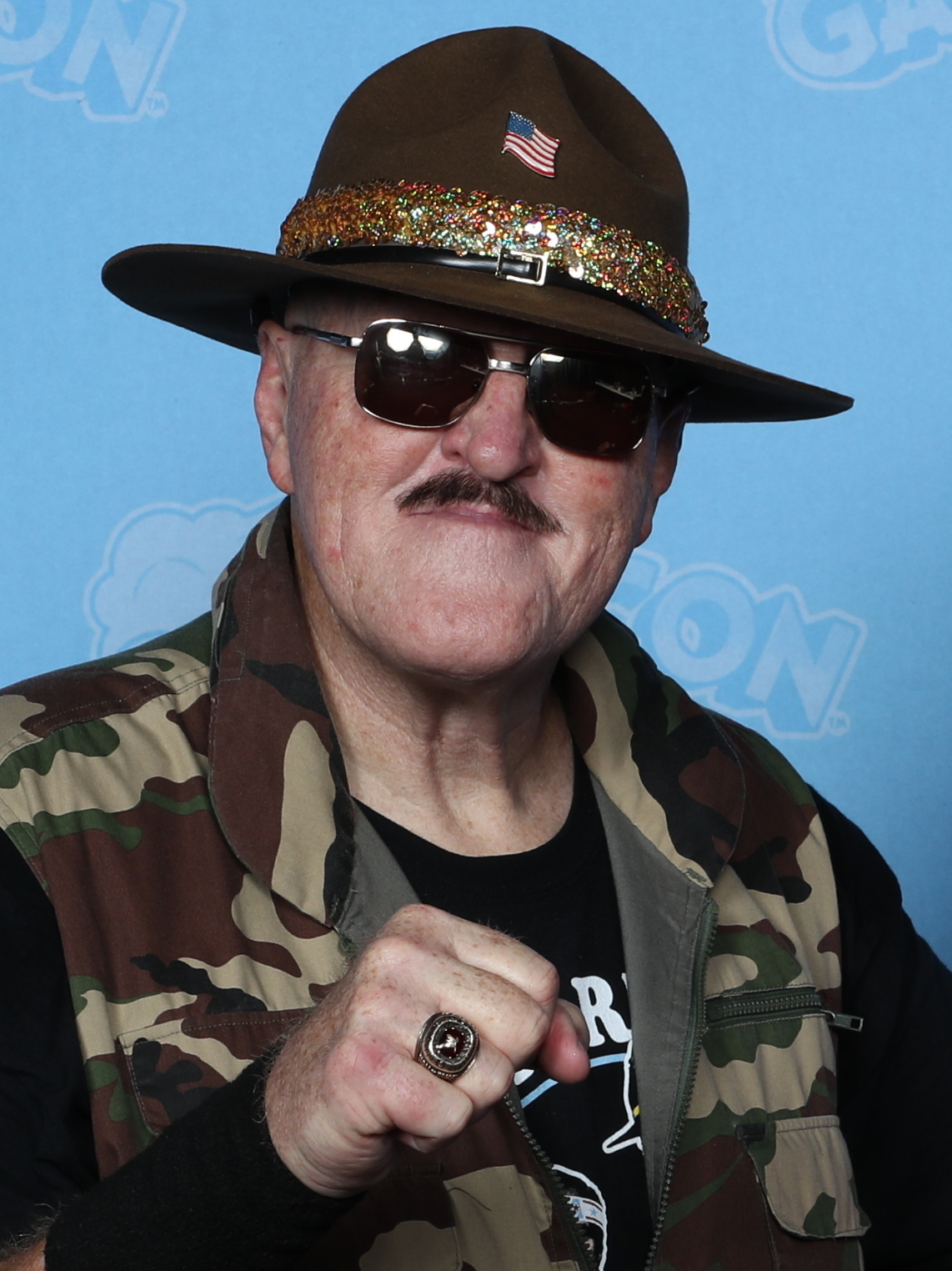
Slaughter in 2021

Fictionalized versions of Sgt. Slaughter were part of the G.I. Joe: A Real American Hero toyline, animated series and comic books, as a member of the G.I. Joe team and first appeared in the five-part TV episode entitled "Arise, Serpentor, Arise!" Along with the traditional merchandising of WWE superstars, Sgt. Slaughter is one of only a few real people to be produced as a G.I. Joe figure (NFL football player William "The Refrigerator" Perry, pro-wrestler Roddy Piper, and astronaut Buzz Aldrin are some of the others) and appeared in G.I. Joe: The Movie. He was featured in the 1989 video game Sgt. Slaughter's Mat Wars by Mindscape.

Slaughter also appeared twice as a special guest on The Super Mario Bros. Super Show!, which starred fellow wrestler Captain Lou Albano. He appeared in the episodes "All Steamed Up" (in "Butch Mario and the Luigi Kid") and "Caught in a Draft" (in "Bad Rap").

During the mid-1980s, Sgt. Slaughter released a full-length LP, Sgt. Slaughter and Camouflage Rocks America. It featured a number of original songs, including "The Cobra Clutch," as well as a cover of Neil Diamond's "America".

In the late 80s, he was featured in the short lived board game “Sgt Slaughter’s Matwars”, put out by Trigame Enterprises of Matawan NJ. This included an appearance at the International Toy Fair at the Javits Center in NYC to promote the game.

A brief cross promotional stint in the late 1980s had Sgt. Slaughter and his "battling battalion" pitted against the Bigfoot Monster Truck in a tug-of-war challenge. It is featured on Blood, Sweat, & Gears USHRA home video. This stunt was recently attempted again with Sgt. Slaughter using fans from the crowd at a Monster Truck show to tug-o-war with Bigfoot.

In the animated series Code Monkeys, Slaughter appeared as Sgt. Murder. He and Bulk Brogan (Hulk Hogan), "Manly Man" Ricky Ravage (Randy "Macho Man" Savage), and Sergei the Giant (André the Giant) were hired by a video game company to take on their rivals. His brother, Tommy Murder, was killed by "The Black Shadow", who really was Black Steve, the company's accountant.

He appeared on episode #3.6 of Comedy Central's Tosh.0, when he clotheslined Daniel Tosh and put David Wills (a.k.a. YouTube's "Crying Wrestling Fan") in a Cobra Clutch during Wills' "Web Redemption" segment.

In 2014, Sgt. Slaughter made a cameo appearance in the RadioShack Super Bowl XLVIII commercial "The '80s Called".

He later voiced Dr. Military in the 2013 animated series Teen Titans Go! in a two-part episode called "Teen Titans Vroom!"

Slaughter voiced an adult-oriented version of himself in the animated WWE Network Exclusive show Camp WWE.

In 2021, Slaughter joined the Masters of the Universe brand, being added to the toyline Masters of the WWEternia. His figure came with similar armor to Man-At-Arms, the mentor to He-Man.

On March 16, 2021, Slaughter was on an episode of WWE's Most Wanted Treasures.

On March 3, 2024, Slaughter was the subject in an episode of Biography: WWE Legends.

Slaughter is a playable character in the following video games WWF Wrestlefest, WWE Smackdown! Here Comes the Pain, WWE Smackdown! vs. Raw 2008, WWE Legends of WrestleMaina, WWE AllStars, WWE WrestleFest 2012, WWE 2K14, WWE SuperCard, WWE 2K15, WWE 2K16 and WWE Battlegrounds.

== Personal life ==
Remus has two daughters with his ex-wife, Diane Kopp. Remus also makes frequent appearances at comic book and wrestling conventions.

He has been reported that starting with former U.S. President Jimmy Carter, and then followed by Carter's successors Ronald Reagan, George H.W. Bush and Bill Clinton, he would be invited to the White House.

== Championships and accomplishments ==
- American Wrestling Association
  - AWA America's Championship (1 time)
  - AWA British Empire Heavyweight Championship (1 time)
- Cauliflower Alley Club
  - Iron Mike Mazurki Award (2011)
- Central States Wrestling
  - NWA Central States Heavyweight Championship (3 times)
- Georgia Championship Wrestling
  - NWA Georgia Tag Team Championship (1 time) – with Pak Song
- George Tragos/Lou Thesz Professional Wrestling Hall of Fame
  - Class of 2019 (Frank Gotch Award)
- Maple Leaf Wrestling
  - NWA Canadian Heavyweight Championship (Toronto version) (1 time)
- Mid-Atlantic Championship Wrestling
  - NWA United States Heavyweight Championship (2 times)
  - NWA World Tag Team Championship (Mid-Atlantic version) (1 time) – with Don Kernodle
- National Wrestling Federation
  - NWF Americas Championship (1 time)
- Northeast Championship Wrestling (Tom Janette)
  - NCW Heavyweight Championship (1 time)
- NWA Tri-State
  - NWA United States Tag Team Championship (Tri-State version) (1 time) – with Buck Robley
- Pro Wrestling Illustrated
  - Most Hated Wrestler of the Year (1991)
  - Most Inspirational Wrestler of the Year (1984)
  - Ranked No. 36 of the top 500 singles wrestlers in the PWI 500 in 1991
  - Ranked No. 34 of the top 500 singles wrestlers of the "PWI Years" in 2003
  - Ranked No. 29 of the 100 best tag teams of the "PWI Years" with Don Kernodle in 2003
- Professional Wrestling Hall of Fame
  - Class of 2016
- USA Pro Wrestling
  - USA Pro Heavyweight Championship (1 time)
- World Wrestling Federation/Entertainment
  - WWF Championship (1 time)
  - WWE Hall of Fame (Class of 2004)
- Wrestling Observer Newsletter
  - Match of the Year (1981) vs. Pat Patterson in an Alley Fight
  - Match of the Year (1983) with Don Kernodle vs. Ricky Steamboat and Jay Youngblood in a Steel Cage match
  - Most Unimproved (1985)
  - Most Washed Up Wrestler (1985)
  - Worst Feud of the Year (1985) vs. Boris Zhukov
  - Most Disgusting Promotional Tactic (1991) Iraqi sympathizer angle
  - Worst Feud of the Year (1991) vs. Hulk Hogan
  - Wrestling Observer Newsletter Hall of Fame (2023)
