= Out to Lunch (video game) =

1993 video game

- European SNES cover art
- Developer: Mindscape
- Publisher: Mindscape
- Composer: Mark Knight
- Platforms: Amiga, CD32, Game Boy, Super NES
- Release: SNES: NA: November 1993; EU: September 1993; Game Boy: EU: 1993; Amiga, CD32; 1994
- Genre: Platform
- Modes: Single-player, multiplayer

Pierre le Chef is... Out to Lunch is a video game that was released for the Game Boy and Super NES in 1993 by Mindscape. It is a side-scrolling platform game about a French chef trying to collect ingredients for his dishes by going to different countries to catch them as they have escaped. Ports for the Amiga and Amiga CD32 were released in 1994.

== Plot ==
Pierre le Chef is touring the world preparing his dishes, but his ingredients have escaped and he must capture them. Pierre must watch out for bacteria, insects, and his arch-rival, Le Chef Noir. Noir, an evil chef jealous of Pierre's success, wants to ruin his career by releasing all of his gathered ingredients.

== Gameplay ==
Pierre le Chef in Mexico

There is a single-player mode and a two-player alternating mode. In either mode, Pierre le Chef is the playable character. The objective is to capture a set number of ingredients before time runs out. Ingredients must be caught in a net and emptied into the level's cage. However, at every level, the player must first find the net before they can catch anything. Once the ingredients are placed in the cage, a door to the next level will appear somewhere in the stage. Along the way, the player will encounter germs and bacteria which, if the player gets touched by, loses a life. The bacteria can also turn the ingredients into hostile enemies against Pierre when they touch them. The player must also be wary of Chef le Noir, who will appear in certain levels to hinder the player's progress. Additionally, the player can pick up weapons like flour bags or hot sauce which can be used to stun ingredients and bacteria. The player must guide Pierre le Chef through Switzerland, Greece, Jamaica (known in the game as the West Indies), Mexico, China and then France. Each country has 8 levels that the player has to navigate through. At the end of every country, the player plays a bonus game where they can collect bonus points for extra lives.

Once the player loses all lives or completes the game, the player is given a final score based on how many points the player got throughout the game and that score is put on the high-score list.

== Reception ==
GameRankings gave the game 59.5%.
