= D/Generation =

1991 video game

- Publisher(s): Mindscape
- Designer(s): Robert Cook
- Programmer(s): Robert Cook; James Brown
- Composer(s): Mark Knight
- Platform(s): MS-DOS, Amiga, Amiga CD32, Atari ST, Atari VCS
- Release: 1991
- Genre(s): Action-adventure
- Mode(s): Single-player

D/Generation is an action-adventure game with puzzle elements developed for the 8-bit Apple II during the late 1980s, but instead published and released for MS-DOS, Amiga, and Atari ST by Mindscape in 1991. The game takes place in a slightly cyberpunk futuristic setting in 2021.

It was ported to the Amiga CD32 in 1993, allowing use of the 6-button CD32 gamepad.

A remake of the game with improved graphics called D/Generation HD was released for Microsoft Windows by West Coast Software on October 23, 2015 and for the Nintendo Switch on March 27, 2018 in North America and on April 3, 2018 in Europe.

== Gameplay ==
D/Generation operates from an isometric point of view consisting of a series of floors, each dotted with various maze-like rooms. The aim of the game is to get through each room, eliminating hostile bioweapon creatures, avoiding or disabling security measures, and rescuing as many trapped people in the area. During the first floor, the player will acquire a laser gun that holds unlimited ammunition and which can be used to kill bioweapons and trigger switches; it also possesses the ability to bounce off walls and use teleporters. Alongside the main weapon, the player can also find a limited number of grenades, bombs and other gadgets that can help in dealing with security measures and bioweapons.

On each floor, the player's aim is to reach a gravity lift that will take them to the next floor, with the exception of the final floor, and must navigate a maze of interconnected rooms. Each room features a mixture of doors, security measures, and, in most cases, bioweapons. To get through a room, the player must navigate through doors triggered by switches, watch out for security measures (such as turrets and mobile laser fences), and deal with any hostile bioweapons in the room; in some cases, having to eliminate all and sealing any open air duct vents on the wall, in order to proceed further. On most floors, some doors will not open without finding a security key to unlock them.

Being killed by bioweapons or security measures causes the player to lose a life and restart the room, but additional lives can be earned by saving trapped people encountered in the room and leading them to an exit marked by a red arrow; in some cases having to lead them around dangerous areas to safety. The player can sometimes meet people who will engage in conversation, allowing them to gather background information regarding the situation of the game's story, as well as interact with computers.

== Plot ==
D/Generation's takes place in an alternate future in which greater advancements of technology in the 20th century culminated in a nuclear war in Asia that led the United Nations (UN) to ban the research and creation of atomic and biological weapons. In June 2021, a courier (the player) receives a job to deliver an emergency package from Paris to a biomedical research facility in Singapore, owned by bio-research company Genoq, at the request of its top researcher, Dr. Jean-Paul Derrida. Upon arriving on the 80th floor of the facility's skyscraper, the courier finds the building in a state of chaos following a major accident, and encounters a survivor who reveals that the building's upper levels are swarming with bioweapons.

Determined to find Derrida, the courier works to make their way through each floor, rescuing as many people as possible, while dealing with security measures and three classes of bioweapons: A/Generation, a red blob that can absorb its target; B/Generation, blue cylindrical column that can merge into the floor and crush its target; and C/Generation, capable of resembling humans and objects in order to ambush its targets. Along the way, the courier learns more about the situation, and discovers that Genoq secretly was conducting illegal bioweapon projects without the UN's knowledge, using its work in biomedicines to cover up its research. Eventually the courier meets a survivor who has learned Genoq intends to bomb the building to cover up the disaster, knowing the truth would ruin the company.

Upon reaching the 89th floor, the courier meets a person claiming to be Derrida, who asks for their help. As the courier does so, the person suddenly attacks them, sending into a psychotropic reality. Within this reality, the courier discovers Derrida, who reveals the disaster was caused by a prototype for a fourth generation bioweapon called D/Generation. Derrida reveals that the new bioweapon was designed to be the ultimate terrorist weapon, but that the prototype gained sentience and sought its freedom. To prevent this, the bioweapon was implemented with a security feature designed to physically paralyse it, but that after it created the disaster and neutralized Derrida, it sent a request, seeking to have the cure for its condition brought over. Knowing it must be stopped, Derrida reveals how he intended to kill it with microwaves from a communication antenna he modified to face into the building, before he was captured.

Receiving the passcode that allows access to a jetpack that can take them away from the building and warn the authorities, the Courier escapes the fake reality, and quickly works to find the D/Generation, luring it into the trap and killing it. Upon escaping, the courier manages to prevent Genoq from destroying its labs, with the UN and the survivors praising them as a hero.

== Development ==
D/Generation was originally developed for the 128K Apple IIe (utilizing Double-Hi-Res mode) under the name D-Generation. An early preliminary version for that platform exists and is dated 1989. According to the Prince of Persia journals by Jordan Mechner, the game was completed in 1990 but the MS-DOS version from 1991 appears to be the first public release. While the original Apple II version was fully playable and well polished, it was never completed nor publicly released.

== Reception ==
Electronic Gaming Monthly gave the Amiga CD32 version a 7.25 out of 10. They criticized that the Amiga CD32 controller does not work well with the game's isometric perspective, but praised the combination of action and puzzles, describing the game as both addictive and challenging.

In 1994, PC Gamer US named D/Generation the 32nd best computer game ever. The editors wrote that its "clever mix of puzzle-solving and arcade action hooked nearly everyone who did get a chance to try it out". That same year, PC Gamer UK named it the 44th best computer game of all time, calling it the "best game of its type on the PC". In 1998, PC Gamer US declared it the 38th best computer game ever released, and the editors wrote that its "gameplay is still as fresh and inviting as the day it was first released".

In 1996, the game was ranked the 40th best game of all time by Amiga Power.
