= Pool Champion =

1995 video game

- Developer(s): Bitmasters
- Publisher(s): Mindscape
- Composer(s): Jerry Gerber
- Platform(s): Windows
- Release: NA: December 15, 1995
- Genre(s): Sports

Pool Champion is a video game developed by American studio Bitmasters and published by Mindscape for Windows in 1995.

== Gameplay ==
Pool Champion is a game in which the player goes from playing in pool halls to pro tournaments.

== Reception ==
Next Generation reviewed the PC version of the game, rating it one star out of five, and stated that "If you're looking for a graphic adventure, buy an adventure. If you're looking for a pool sim, you're better off checking out Interplay's Virtual Pool."
