= Don Kernodle =

American professional wrestler (1950–2021)

Personal information
- Born: Charles Donald Kernodle Jr. May 2, 1950 Burlington, North Carolina, U.S.
- Died: May 17, 2021 (aged 71)

Professional wrestling career
- Ring name: Don Kernodle
- Billed height: 6 ft 1 in (1.85 m)
- Billed weight: 290 lb (130 kg)
- Trained by: Ole Anderson; Gene Anderson
- Debut: 1973
- Retired: 2006

Charles Donald Kernodle Jr. (May 2, 1950 – May 17, 2021) was an American professional wrestler with the National Wrestling Alliance's Jim Crockett Promotions.

== Professional wrestling career ==
=== Early Career (1973–1982) ===
In college, Kernodle lettered four times in amateur wrestling. He was also a two time national arm wrestling champion. After graduating from Elon College, Kernodle started wrestling in 1973 in the National Wrestling Alliance's Jim Crockett Promotions. He got his start by accepting a "shoot" wrestling challenge from Bob Roop. Although Roop defeated Kernodle by submission, Kernodle's skills impressed Ole Anderson and Gene Anderson who both offered to train Kernodle for free.

=== Cobra Corps in Mid-Atlantic (1982–1984) ===
At first, he (now known as Pvt. Kernodle) was part of Sgt. Slaughter's "Cobra Corps" and teamed with Slaughter and Pvt. Jim Nelson. In 1982, the team of Kernodle and Nelson won the NWA Mid-Atlantic Tag Team Championship from Porkchop Cash and Jay Youngblood. They later lost the title to Cash and King Parsons, from whom they also regained the title. After Nelson was removed from the alliance, Kernodle became the tag partner of Sgt. Slaughter, with whom he held the NWA World Tag Team Championship in late 1982 and early 1983. They lost the titles in a steel cage match vs. Rick Steamboat and Jay Youngblood on March 12, 1983.

=== World Wrestling Federation (1982–1984) ===
While teaming with Nelson, the duo wrestled on at least three cards co-promoted by the World Wrestling Federation in Maple Leaf Gardens in 1982, wrestling Steamboat and Youngblood at least twice, with Kernodle defeating Youngblood for the NWA Canadian Television Championship in a solo bout on August 8, 1982.

Kernodle would continue to wrestle on co-promoted cards through May 23, 1983 when he made his Madison Square Garden debut for the WWF. Kernodle would wrestle in the WWF through November 1983, being primarily featured on television defeating the likes of Jeff Craney, Jack Carson, Bill Dixon, Steve King, and Tony Colon but falling short to Tito Santana and Rocky Johnson in single competition and The Invaders in tag team competition. Additionally, Kernodle was frequently used as a substitute for Afa Anoa'i in main event matches throughout 1983. Kernodle's last bout in the WWF was on a co-promoted card in 1984 at Maple Leaf Gardens against Santana.

=== Return to NWA (1984–1986) ===
Kernodle with Ivan and Nikita Koloff

Following the title loss and brief stint in the WWF, Kernodle remained a villain and formed a tag team with Bob Orton, Jr. and was managed by Gary Hart. He soon turned against America and formed a tag team with Ivan Koloff and won the NWA World Tag Team Title. When Koloff's "nephew" Nikita Koloff arrived in late 1984, Kernodle helped to train him. Also in 1984, the Koloffs turned on Kernodle after he and Ivan lost the NWA World Tag Titles to Dusty Rhodes and Manny "The Raging Bull" Fernandez and started a feud. Kernodle teamed with his brother Rocky to feud with the Koloffs and helped the Rock 'n' Roll Express to win the Tag Team Title from them at Starrcade '85: The Gathering.

In 1986, Kernodle left the NWA and retired from wrestling. He later became a deputy sheriff in Alamance County, NC.

=== Later Career (1997–2006) ===
He came out of retirement in 1997 working in various independent promotions in the Carolinas.

In 2002, Kernodle and his brother wrestled several times with CWF Mid-Atlantic near their home in Burlington, NC. He wrestled his last match in 2006.

After wrestling, he became a deputy sheriff with the Alamance County sheriff's office.

== Other media ==
He appeared in the 1978 Sylvester Stallone movie Paradise Alley.

== Death ==
Kernodle died on May 17, 2021, at the age of 71. Kernodle had had several health issues prior to his death and CTE. It was later revealed that Kernodle died after committing suicide by gunshot after visiting the doctor.

== Championships and accomplishments ==
- George Tragos/Lou Thesz Professional Wrestling Hall of Fame
  - Class of 2021
- Maple Leaf Wrestling
  - NWA Canadian Television Championship (1 time)
- Mid-Atlantic Championship Wrestling
  - NWA Mid-Atlantic Tag Team Championship (2 times) - with Pvt. Jim Nelson (2)
  - NWA World Six-Man Tag Team Championship (1 time) - with Ivan & Nikita Koloff
  - NWA World Tag Team Championship (3 times) - with Sgt. Slaughter (1), Bob Orton, Jr. (1), and Ivan Koloff (1)
- Pro Wrestling Illustrated
  - PWI ranked him # 463 of the 500 best singles wrestlers during the "PWI Years" in 2003
  - PWI ranked # 29 of the 100 best tag teams of the "PWI Years" with Sgt. Slaughter
- World Wrestling Council
  - WWC Puerto Rico Heavyweight Championship (1 time)
