= Loco (video game) =

1984 video game

- Publisher: Alligata
- Designer: Antony Crowther
- Programmers: Commodore 64; Antony Crowther; ZX Spectrum; Richard Stevenson; Nigel Speight
- Composer: Ben Daglish
- Platforms: Commodore 64, Atari 8-bit, ZX Spectrum
- Release: 1984: C64; 1986: Atari; 1987: Spectrum

Loco is a video game developed by Antony Crowther and released by Alligata for the Commodore 64 in 1984. Loco is a clone of the 1982 Sega arcade game Super Locomotive. The game was later ported to the ZX Spectrum and Atari 8-bit computers. The ZX Spectrum port was developed by Richard Stevenson and Nigel Speight. The music for the game is a version of Jean-Michel Jarre's Equinoxe 5 and 6 by Ben Daglish.

Crowther's subsequent Suicide Express is related to Loco, though not an official sequel.

== Reception ==
In July 1984 Loco was awarded game of the month by Personal Computer Games magazine.
