= Sgt. Slaughter's Mat Wars =

1989 professional wrestling video game

- Cover art featuring Sgt. Slaughter
- Developer: Beam Software
- Publisher: Mindscape
- Programmer: Nigel Spencer
- Platform: Commodore 64
- Release: November 15, 1989
- Genre: Sports
- Mode: Single-player

Sgt. Slaughter's Mat Wars is a professional wrestling sports video game developed by Beam Software and published by Mindscape. It is based on the professional wrestler Sgt. Slaughter and the original board game developed by John T. Georgopoulos of Trigame Enterprises. It was released on November 15, 1989, exclusively for the Commodore 64.

== Gameplay ==
The game requires a Commodore 64 joystick to play and features what, at the time of its 1989 release, was a unique gameplay option involving managers of the wrestlers. Players can choose from five managers: Delores, Fast Ed, Big John, Abdul Makash, and Lucky. These managers play a crucial role in the game's trading system, allowing players to buy and trade wrestlers in Sgt. Slaughter's Auction House. The game also allows players to bet on matches and bribe other wrestlers to throw their matches.

Sgt. Slaughter does not appear as a playable character, although he functions as referee in matches and infrequent appearances as an in-game narrative device. The game includes several match types, including singles and tag team bouts. It also features multiple game modes, including a narrative-driven story mode and an exhibition mode for quick matches.

== Development ==
Nigel Spencer, the programmer behind the game shared insights into the game's development in an interview. Spencer highlighted the game's technical advancements, particularly the use of real-time scaling of high-resolution screens, a first for the C64.

== Release ==
Sgt. Slaughter's Mat Wars was released on November 15, 1989, for the Commodore 64. The game was developed by Beam Software and published by Mindscape during the height of Sgt. Slaughter's popularity in the late 1980s.

== See also ==
- List of professional wrestling video games
