= Who Dares Wins II =

1985 video game

- Developer: Alligata
- Publishers: Alligata; Tynesoft
- Programmer: Steve Evans
- Platforms: Amstrad CPC, Atari 8-bit, BBC Micro, Commodore 64, C16 / Plus/4, MSX, ZX Spectrum
- Release: EU: November 1985
- Genre: Run and gun
- Mode: Single-player

Who Dares Wins II is a run and gun video game developed and published by Alligata Software and released in late 1985 for the Commodore 64, as well as the Amstrad CPC, Atari 8-bit computers, BBC Micro, Commodore 16, Plus/4, MSX, and ZX Spectrum. The game is a modified version of the earlier Who Dares Wins, which was withdrawn after legal action due to its alleged similarities to the arcade video game Commando.

== Gameplay ==
Gameplay screenshot (Atari 8-bit)

The main character is a lone soldier sent into enemy territory, wielding a gun and five grenades. The player must capture eight enemy outposts against massive opposition. The player can blow up vehicles and rescue prisoners in each level. If the player takes too long, the prisoners are executed by firing squad.

== Reception ==
Zzap!64 rated the game a 90/100, calling the game "fantastic" and the landscapes "incredible". It revisited the game 7 years later and gave it a revised rating of 78/100, saying that "it just hasn't weathered the years too well", but that it was "still very playable".

Dion Guy of Nintendo Life called the game something he wished was on the Nintendo Virtual Console, and "a lot of fun" despite not being extremely difficult.

== Original "Who Dares Wins" and legal case ==
Who Dares Wins II was a modified version of Who Dares Wins, an earlier Alligata release for the Commodore 64. This had been withdrawn almost immediately after release following legal action from Elite Systems due to similarities between it and the arcade game Commando.

(This similarity had been noted at the time by Computer Gamer magazine who described Who Dares Wins as an "accurate reproduction" of Commando. The original game was also retrospectively acknowledged by GamesThatWeren't as "a blatant copy".)

Elite held the official license for home conversions of Commando and- according to the company's Steve Wilcox- considered that Who Dares Wins would hurt sales of their official version. After approaching Alligata to notify them of the legal situation and being rebuffed, Elite sought legal advice and obtained an Anton Piller order, leading to Alligata's supplies of the game being sequestered.

As a result, few copies of the original Who Dares Wins made it out before withdrawal, with some having been sold via a computer show before the official release date and the game having been confirmed as being briefly available elsewhere before it was taken off shelves.

Following the withdrawal, Alligata modified Who Dares Wins with cosmetic and layout changes to get around the legal order and issued the updated version as Who Dares Wins II.
