= CyberSpeed =

1995 video game

- North American PlayStation box art
- Developer: Mindscape International
- Publishers: PlayStation: NA/EU: Mindscape; JP: GAGA Communications; Windows: WW: Mindscape
- Producer: Jonathan Taylor
- Designer: Andy Kerridge
- Programmers: Jonathan Taylor; Paul Brooke; Paul Gaze
- Artists: Adrian Crofts; Trevor Moore
- Writer: Richard Hewison
- Composer: Mark Knight
- Platforms: PlayStation, Windows
- Release: PlayStation: NA: September 15, 1995; EU: December 15, 1995; JP: August 9, 1996; Windows: WW: 1995
- Genre: Racing
- Mode: Single-player

CyberSpeed is a 1995 racing video game developed and published by Mindscape for the PlayStation and Windows.

== Gameplay ==
CyberSpeed is a racing game where the vehicles are suspended from a force beam of energy.

== Reception ==
Next Generation reviewed the PlayStation version of the game, rating it three stars out of five, and stated that "It's not in the same league as Wipeout, but it's different and enjoyable in its own right."

Next Generation reviewed the PC version of the game, rating it one star out of five, and stated that "The only winning grace is the mock commercials that run between races, and those are more ridiculous than funny. If you want a racing sim, check out Whiplash and avoid CyberSpeed like, well, Roseanne in a bikini."

Computer Game Review was broadly negative toward the game; the three reviewers concluded, "It is a damn good thing that Mindscape has other projects in the oven." PC Entertainment offered the game a rating of D.
