= Zig Zag (1987 video game) =

1987 video game

- European cover art
- Developer(s): Zig Zag Software
- Publisher(s): EU: Mirrorsoft; NA: Spectrum HoloByte
- Designer(s): Antony Crowther
- Platform(s): Commodore 64/128
- Release: EU: 1987; NA: 1988
- Genre(s): Shoot 'em up
- Mode(s): Single-player

Zig Zag is a shoot 'em up video game developed by Zig Zag Software and published by Mirrorsoft for the Commodore 64 in 1987. It was designed by Antony Crowther. Spectrum Holobyte published the game in North America in 1988, part of the company's International Series brand.

== Gameplay ==
The player controls a spaceship and the objective of the game is to collect eight crystal fragments hidden in a maze while shooting enemy aliens and solving puzzles. The game is played from an isometric viewpoint. The game has been compared to Sega's Zaxxon.

== Reception ==
Reception

Review scores
Publication	Score
ACE	783/1000
Computer and Video Games	8/7/8/7
Tilt	15/20
Zzap!64	92%
Commodore User	8/10
Your Commodore	7/7/7/8

Zig Zag received generally positive reviews. Computer and Video Games said "[i]t will probably appeal to people who like games that are original and full of new ideas". Commodore User called it "[...] one of the most sophisticated hunt 'n' kill maze games that you're ever likely to see on the 64, with smooth action, flawless animation, solid 3D scenery and a nice line in clanky metallic sound effects". ACE was disappointed that the game gradually lost the puzzle elements in favor of shooting. Zzap!64 called it "[a]n unusual, but highly polished shooting and exploring game", and a return to form for Crowther after a string of disappointing releases. Tilt called Zig Zag "a very original and exciting program". Your Commodore said that it's "[...] a game that requires a combination of shoot' em up, mapping, and arcade adventure skills".
