= NWA Canadian Television Championship =

Professional wrestling championship

Details
- Promotion: Maple Leaf Wrestling
- Date established: June 27, 1982
- Date retired: July 1984
Statistics
- First champion(s): Jay Youngblood
- Final champion(s): Brian Adias
- Most reigns: Private Nelson (2 reigns)

The NWA Canadian Television Championship was a secondary singles title in Toronto-based NWA affiliate Maple Leaf Wrestling from 1982 to 1984, when the title was abandoned after the promotion left the NWA to join the World Wrestling Federation (WWF). The old Canadian TV title belt was later used as the physical belt for the heavyweight championship of the now-defunct Apocalypse Wrestling Federation in Toronto.

== Title history ==
Key
No.	Overall reign number
Reign	Reign number for the specific champion
Days	Number of days held

No.	Champion	Championship change			Reign statistics		Notes	Ref.
No.	Champion	Date	Event	Location	Reign	Days	Notes	Ref.
1	Jay Youngblood	June 27, 1982	MLW show	Toronto, ON	1	112	Defeated The Destroyer in a tournament final to become the first champion	
2	Private Nelson	October 17, 1982	MLW show	Toronto, ON	1	70		
3	Terry Kay	December 26, 1982	MLW show	Toronto, ON	1	91		
4	Private Nelson	March 27, 1983	MLW show	Toronto, ON	2	N/A		
—	Vacated	June 1983	—	—	—	—	Vacated when Nelson left the promotion	
5	Mike Rotunda	August 7, 1983	MLW show	Toronto, ON	1	70	Defeated Don Kernodle in a tournament final to win the vacant title	
6	Don Kernodle	October 16, 1983	MLW show	Toronto, ON	1	238		
7	Brian Adidas	June 10, 1984	MLW show	Toronto, ON	1	N/A		
—	Deactivated		—	—	—	—	Maple Leaf Wrestling joined the WWF	
