= Son of Blagger =

1983 video game

- Publisher: Alligata
- Designer: Antony Crowther
- Programmers: Commodore 64; Antony Crowther; ZX Spectrum; Elliot Gay
- Series: Blagger
- Platforms: Commodore 64, ZX Spectrum, BBC Micro
- Release: 1983
- Genre: Platform
- Mode: Single-player

Son of Blagger, the sequel to Blagger, is a scrolling platform game created by Tony Crowther and released by Alligata for the Commodore 64 computer in 1983. A ZX Spectrum port by Elliot Gay and a BBC Micro port were released in 1984.

== Legacy ==
A clone of Son of Blagger was released for the Amiga, titled Jonas Fulstrand. The game was released on a PD-Soft disk as Son of Blagger.
