= Alligata =

Computer games developer and publisher

Alligata Software Ltd. was a computer games developer and publisher based in Sheffield in the UK in the 1980s.

The company was founded by brothers Mike and Tim Mahony and their father J.R. Mahony in 1983. They produced games for a number of home computers including the Commodore 64, BBC Micro, Acorn Electron, ZX Spectrum and Dragon 32. The company published many of Tony Crowther's early Commodore 64 games, including Aztec Tomb, Blagger and Loco. Chris Butler was another programmer whose earlier games were released by Alligata. The company also published budget priced software under the Budgie label.

Tim Mahony took over the day-to-day running of the company in 1987 and closed the company nine months later. The name and back catalogue were sold to Superior Software. Two titles were released under the joint Superior/Alligata label for ports of Superior's BBC/Electron games to other systems. Superior also included some old Alligata games on their Play It Again Sam compilations.

== Games ==
- Aztec Tomb - 1983 (C64)
- Here Comes The Sun - 1983 (ZX Spectrum)
- Bug Blaster - 1983 (C64, BBC Micro, Acorn Electron)
- Lunar Rescue - 1983 (BBC Micro, Acorn Electron)
- Blagger - 1983 (C64, BBC Micro, Acorn Electron, MSX, Commodore 16); a version was also released through Amsoft for the Amstrad CPC
- Loco - 1984 (C64, ZX Spectrum, Atari 8-bit)
- Son of Blagger - 1984 (C64, ZX Spectrum, BBC Micro)
- Who Dares Wins - 1985 (C64)
- Jack Charlton's Match Fishing - 1985 (C64, ZX Spectrum)
- Blagger Goes to Hollywood - 1985 (C64)
- Who Dares Wins II - 1986 (C64, ZX Spectrum, BBC Micro, MSX, Amstrad CPC)
- Night World - 1986 (BBC Micro, Acorn Electron)
- Kettle - 1987 (C64, ZX Spectrum, Amstrad CPC)
- Livingstone, I Presume? - 1987 (C64, ZX Spectrum, MSX, Amstrad CPC); UK release of Spanish Opera Soft game Livingstone, Supongo
- Addicta Ball - 1987 (C64, MSX, Amiga, Atari ST)
- By Fair Means or Foul - 1988 (C64, ZX Spectrum, Amstrad CPC); a Superior/Alligata release
- Repton Mania - 1989 (ZX Spectrum); ports of the first 2 Repton games - a Superior/Alligata release

== Budgie label ==
Alligata published budget games under the Budgie label from 1985. When a typical Alligata game would cost around £6.95, Budgie games sold for only £1.99 in order to compete with the likes of budget software pioneer Mastertronic, already selling games at that level. Almost all titles were original rather than re-issues of Alligata games. Probably the most well known game is space shoot 'em up Video's Revenge (BBC Micro, Acorn Electron) with others including Convoy (ZX Spectrum), Super Sam (ZX Spectrum, Amstrad CPC), Raskel (C64) and Shuffle (BBC Micro, Acorn Electron).
