= Worlds of Legend: Son of the Empire =

1993 video game

- Developer(s): Mindscape
- Publisher(s): Mindscape
- Designer(s): Anthony Taglione; Peter Owen-James
- Platform(s): Amiga, MS-DOS
- Release: June 1993
- Genre(s): Role-playing
- Mode(s): Single-player

Worlds of Legend: Son of the Empire is a 1993 role-playing video game developed and published by Mindscape for the Amiga and MS-DOS. It is a sequel to Legend from 1992.

== Plot ==
The game continues from Legend with four adventurers celebrating their victory over chaos in Trazere. A messenger interrupts the celebration with news of the Emperor's murder and a power struggle among four warlords. The adventurers ride to the Imperial castle and are greeted by Aunt Sushiana who instructs them to find the murderer in the palace vaults. After the party has dealt with him, Sushiana tells that to reunite the realm, they must collect four shards of an amulet and awaken the eternal champion to defeat the warlords.

== Gameplay ==
The party consists of four characters, all different classes: Berserker, Troubadour, Assassin, and Runemaster. Each character has a unique ability. The sex and clothing of the characters can be changed before starting the game. The game has a world map view where the party travel between cities while avoiding armies of the warlords. In the dungeon areas the party solves puzzles and fight monsters. The dungeons are depicted from an isometric viewpoint. The Runemaster is able to create a variety of spells and magical weapons from runes and other ingredients.

== Reception ==
Reception

Review scores
| Publication | Score |
|---|---|
| Aktueller Software Markt | 9/12 (DOS, Amiga) |
| Amiga Computing | 60% |
| Amiga Format | 88% |
| Amiga Power | 81% (1993); 88% (1994) |
| Computer and Video Games | 88% (DOS) |
| CU Amiga | 90% |

CU Amiga said: "The scenario is realistic, the action thick and fast and the magic system without equal. This game is one of the most believable and playable RPGs to date." Amiga Computing liked the simple control method but disliked the graphics and animations and called the game overall unoriginal. Amiga Power was disappointed how similar the game was to Legend but still concluded that the game "is so much fun that it doesn't matter how far up the RPG evolutionary ladder it is - it works and it works well." Amiga Format summarized similarly: "Overall, Worlds of Legend is a good game, but there are no real advances from Legend". Aktueller Software Markt also was disappointed how similar the game was to its predecessor but concluded that the game is just as good as Legend. Computer and Video Games concluded: "WOL is excellent once you get to grips with the subtleties of controlling four characters at once. It then opens up into one a highly involving, and exceedingly original RPG."
