= Captain Planet and the Planeteers (video game) =

1991 video game

- NES cover art of Captain Planet
- Developers: Chris Gray Enterprises; NovaLogic (Genesis)
- Publishers: Mindscape; Sega (Genesis)
- Composers: Peter Stone, Nick Eastridge (NES); Antony Crowther, Ben Daglish (Amiga/ST)
- Platforms: NES; Amiga; Atari ST; Amstrad CPC; ZX Spectrum; Mega Drive
- Release: NES: NA: September 1991; EU: August 20, 1992; ZX Spectrum: EU: 1992; Amiga: EU: 1991; Mega Drive: EU: 1993
- Genre: 2D action platformer
- Mode: Single-player

Captain Planet and the Planeteers is a 1991 video game released for various platforms in the early 1990s, loosely based on the environmentalist animated series Captain Planet and the Planeteers. Three versions were developed to suit three different platform capabilities, each with markedly different gameplay.

== Gameplay ==
=== NES version ===
The NES version has five levels, each of which are divided into two different types of stages. The first involves controlling the international teen heroes, the Planeteers, flying their Eco-Jet to an enemy fortress, while avoiding instant death by touching any of the scenery, projectiles, or birds. The second stage involves controlling Captain Planet, fighting toward an ecovillain from the TV series.

The NES version's levels are set in the Yellowstone National Park, the Atlantic Ocean, Africa, and Antarctica.

=== Amiga/Atari ST version ===
The Amiga/Atari version has five stages, one for each Planeteer, and a final stage controlling Captain Planet. Each Planeteer stage has at least one objective, and some have two: to clean up pollution using the Planeteer's magic ring power, or to rescue a particular type of animal using a Planeteer vehicle. Completing the objectives opens the exit gate for the level; touching environmental hazards or the unusual monsters costs a life, failing the objective by killing any of the animals will crack the Planeteer's ring depicted at the bottom of the screen (in the Amiga version), opening the level's exit gate early. The final level allows the player to control Captain Planet, who must be navigated to the end of the stage by using and swapping powers held in bubbles throughout the level. He has an ecovillain boss fight, with either Hoggish Greedly, Dr. Blight and her computer MAL, Looten Plunder and his assistant Argos Bleak, or Duke Nukem.

=== Genesis/Mega Drive version ===
The Mega Drive/Genesis version has four stages, one for each Planeteer (save Ma-Ti), and a final stage controlling Captain Planet against Zarm's barge. The game has an inner countdown that measures how much time the player has to complete the four ecovillains' stages: Dr. Blight, Hoggish Greedly, Duke Nukem and Verminous Skumm. After defeating the four ecovillains, the player begins the last stage as Captain Planet, with another countdown.

== Reception ==
The computer magazine Crash rated the game 88 out of 100. Amiga Fun gave a favourable review to the Amiga version of the game, giving it a 79% and stating it was "reasonably playable", but criticized the sound and graphics.

Sega Pro gave the Genesis version a mixed review, rating it 59 out of 100 and describing it as "dull and repetitive". Sega Force Mega review gave it an average 45 score out of 100, calling it a "lifeless platform game".

Game Players magazine rated the NES version 4 (below average), but praised its graphics. Likewise, VideoGames & Computer Entertainment gave it an unfavourable review, disliking the controls for the eco-jet and Captain Planet, as well as its "primitive" gameplay.
