= Blagger (video game) =

1983 video game

- Developer: Antony Crowther
- Publishers: Alligata; Amsoft
- Platforms: Commodore 64, Acorn Electron, Amstrad CPC, BBC Micro, Commodore 16, Plus/4, MSX, Amstrad PCW
- Release: 1983
- Genre: Platform
- Mode: Single-player

Blagger is a platform game created by Antony Crowther for the Commodore 64 and released by Alligata in 1983. A BBC Micro port was released the same year, Acorn Electron, Amstrad CPC (through Amsoft) and MSX in 1984, Commodore 16 and Plus/4 in 1985, and Amstrad PCW in 1987.

Son of Blagger, was released in 1984 and a third and final game Blagger Goes to Hollywood in 1985.

== Gameplay ==
Blagger includes platforms, ladders, conveyor belts, keys and baddies.

The game is divided into a series of single-screen levels. The goal of the player on each screen is to manipulate Roger, a burglar, to collect the scattered keys and then reach the safe. The keys must be collected and the safe opened in a limited amount of time. Blagger can walk left and right, and jump left, right and up. The jumping action is in a fixed pattern and cannot be altered once initiated. Gameplay involves learning the best order in which to collect the keys, and good timing of movement and jumping.

Not all platforms are permanent; some decay once Blagger has stepped on them. Other platforms serve to move Blagger in a particular direction. Blagger will die if he touches cacti, one of the moving enemy obstacles of the level, or if he falls more than a certain distance. The moving enemies vary from level to level, and include cars, aliens, mad hatters, and giant mouths. The movement of the enemies is in a fixed pattern, generally travelling from one point to another and back again.

== Reception ==
Personal Computer Games thought the game was 'a rip-off of Manic Miner'. They did, however praise the 'very clear graphics' and concluded 'if you liked Manic Miner, Blagger will undoubtedly appeal to you'. They gave the game an overall rating of 7/10. The same magazine reviewed the Amstrad version which was considered to be 'a very creditable version' with very good graphics and animation. They did criticise the 'repetitive' music, which was 'tedious'. An overall rating of 8/10 was given.
