= Super Locomotive =

1982 video game

- Developer: Sega
- Publisher: Sega
- Designer: Fukumura Mizunaga
- Programmer: Fukumura Mizunaga
- Platform: Arcade
- Release: JP: December 1982; EU: 1983
- Genre: Action
- Modes: Up to 2 players, alternating turns
- Arcade system: Sega Z80

Super Locomotive (Note: Japanese: スーパーロコモーティブ, Hepburn: Sūpā Rokomōtibu) is a side-scrolling train action video game developed by Sega and released for arcades in 1982.

== Gameplay ==
The objective of the game is to guide a train from one station to next. Along the route, the player must avoid obstacles such as other trains, planes, red signals, trucks crossing intersections, and guide the train along multiple routes by changing tracks en route. The player is armed with a steam fire bullet for destroying airborne targets, and a temporary force field which protects the train for a limited period of time. The use of the bullets and shields rapidly deplete an energy bar which must be maintained between levels by picking up oil items en route. Upon completion of a level, a bonus stage is played which involves the train attempting to shoot as many airborne enemies within a finite time period. The bonus awarded is dependent upon the number of enemies destroyed. The game then resumes on more challenging levels.

== Soundtrack ==
The game's soundtrack features a chiptune rendition of Yellow Magic Orchestra's synthpop hit "Rydeen" (1979) playing throughout the main gameplay.

The same tune later appeared in several personal computer games, including Rabbit Software's Trooper Truck (1983) and Superior Software's Stryker's Run (1986), and as the Ocean Software loader theme for Daley Thompson's Decathlon (1984).

The Sega Genesis Mini 2 version replaces "Rydeen" with the song "Ryzeen" by Oriental Magnetic Yellow, a YMO parody band led by composer Shinji Hosoe.

== Reception ==
Computer and Video Games magazine reviewed the game in its September 1983 issue. They said it is an "enjoyable romp" with "a good setting" and "a marvelous rousing tune that adds immediately to the action."

== Legacy ==
The game was sold in Japan and Europe. In the UK, a machine was sited in a small arcade in a wooden building next to a small funfair in the seaside town of Morecambe. The arcade and funfair shut down in the 1980s and the site is now a car park, behind and to the left of the Johnny's Fun Factory arcade.

While no official conversion of the game existed until 2022, the computer game Loco (1984) is heavily inspired by Super Locomotive. In 2022, Sega released the Sega Genesis Mini 2 (also known as the Mega Drive Mini 2), which included a Genesis port of Super Locomotive developed by M2.

The game is considered one of the earliest train video games, making it a precursor to train simulator video games such as Ongakukan's Train Simulator series (1995 debut) and Densha de Go! (1996 debut).
