= Jay Youngblood =

American professional wrestler (1955 – 1985)

Steven Romero
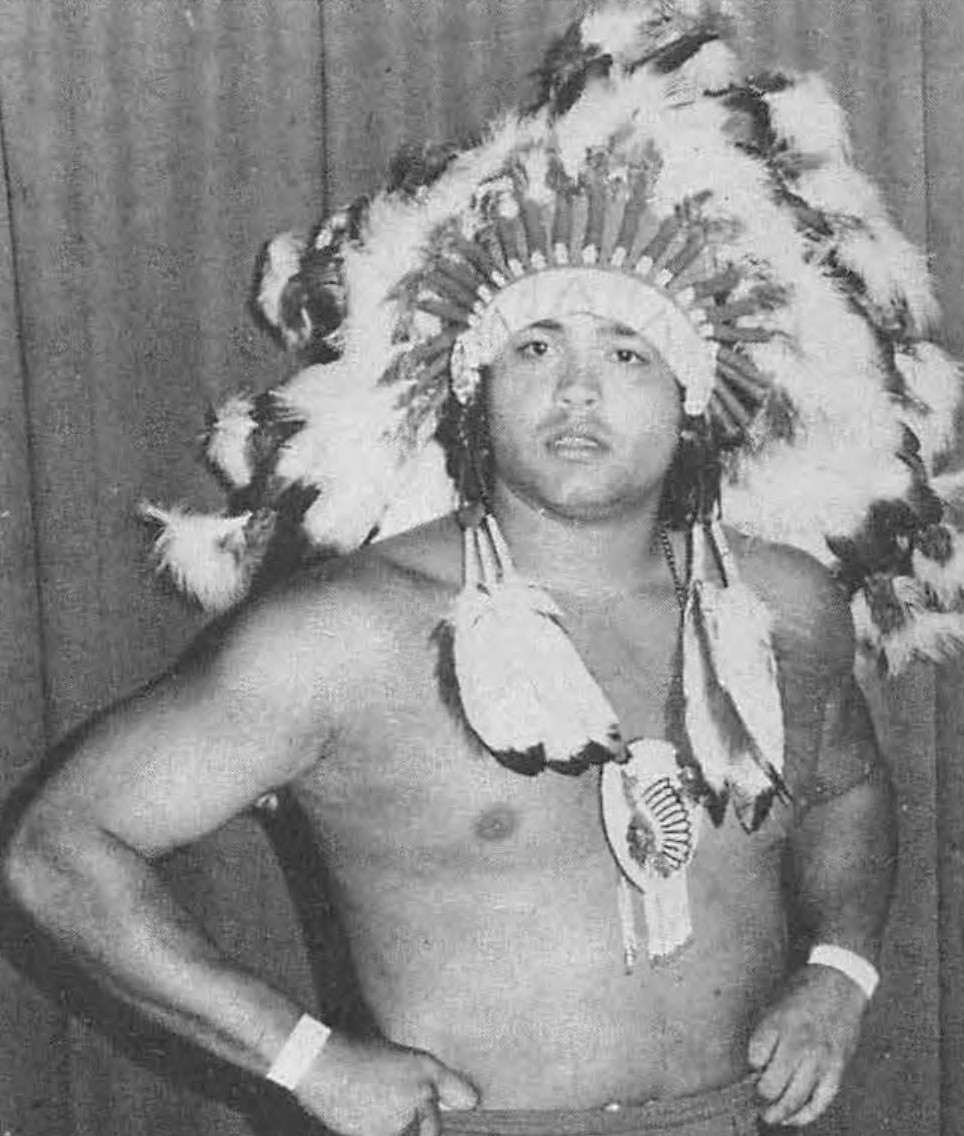
- Youngblood, circa 1979

Personal information
- Born: Steven Nicolas Romero; June 21, 1955 Fontana, California, U.S.
- Died: September 2, 1985 (aged 30) Parkville, Victoria, Australia
- Family: Ricky Romero (father); Chris Youngblood (brother); Mark Youngblood (brother)

Professional wrestling career
- Ring name(s): Jay Youngblood; The Renegade; Silver Streak
- Billed height: 6 ft 0 in (1.83 m)
- Billed weight: 242 lb (110 kg)
- Trained by: Ricky Romero
- Debut: 1975

Steven Nicolas Romero (June 21, 1955 – September 2, 1985) was an American professional wrestler better known by his ring name Jay Youngblood. He wrestled in the National Wrestling Alliance's Jim Crockett Promotions in a tag team with Ricky Steamboat. In addition, he wrestled with Championship Wrestling from Florida, Pacific Northwest Wrestling, NWA All-Star Wrestling and the American Wrestling Association.

== Professional wrestling career ==
Romero's father had discouraged him from entering professional wrestling, but despite this, he started wrestling in 1975 in Amarillo under a mask, calling himself "Silver Streak". After this, he moved to Pacific Northwest Wrestling with a Native American gimmick under the name of Jay Youngblood. He engaged in a feud with Buddy Rose; at one point, Youngblood claimed that Rose had broken his arm. He also teamed with Joe Lightfoot as "The Indians", capturing the NWA Canadian Tag Team Championship in November 1980. On June 27, 1982 in Maple Leaf Wrestling, Youngblood defeated The Destroyer in the finals of a tournament to win the NWA Canadian Television Championship, becoming the inaugural champion.

Youngblood wrestled in the National Wrestling Alliance's Jim Crockett Promotions (JCP) in a main-event tag team with Ricky Steamboat. Also in JCP, he was known as "The Renegade". In October 1979, Youngblood and Steamboat defeated Baron von Raschke and Paul Jones for their first reign with the NWA World Tag Team Championship. They held the titles until losing them to Ray Stevens and Greg Valentine in April 1980, but they regained the titles in a rematch in May until dropping them in June to Stevens and Jimmy Snuka. Youngblood even held the NWA Mid-Atlantic Tag Team Championship with Porkchop Cash, Johnny Weaver, and Steamboat.

By 1982, Steamboat and Youngblood were feuding with Boris Zhukov, Don Kernodle, and their manager Sgt. Slaughter. Zhukov, then known as Private Jim Nelson, later betrayed his team in favour of Youngblood and Steamboat. The rivalry culminated in a steel cage match on March 12, 1983, where Slaughter and Kernodle lost their NWA World Tag Team Championship to Steamboat and Youngblood. He was later defeated by Private Jim Nelson for the title. Steamboat and Youngblood also feuded with Jack and Jerry Brisco, trading the tag team titles with them several times. At the inaugural Starrcade pay-per-view on November 24, with Angelo Mosca as the special guest referee, Youngblood and Steamboat defeated the Briscos to win back the World Tag Team Championships. However, the titles were vacated on December 25 when Steamboat announced his retirement.

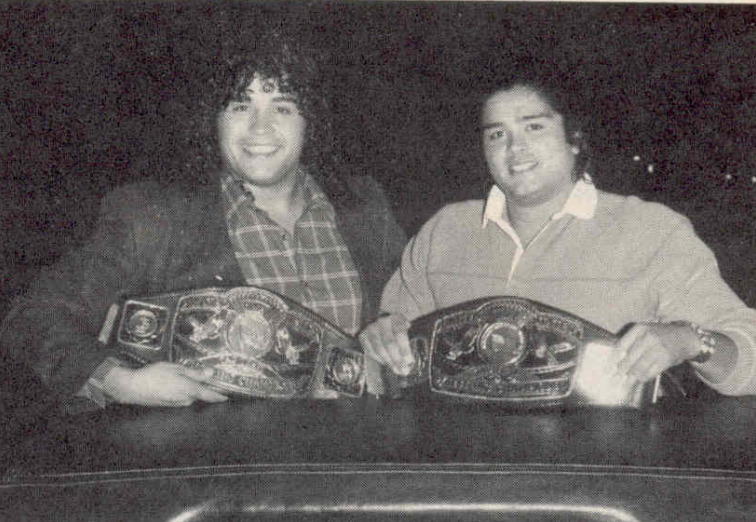
Jay (right) and Mark (left) as NWA United States Tag Team Champions, circa 1985

He went to Championship Wrestling from Florida in September 1984, where he and his brother Mark Youngblood captured the Florida version of the NWA United States Tag Championship two times. Also in 1984, Youngblood wrestled in Puerto Rico for the World Wrestling Council (WWC), and in 1985, he wrestled in American Wrestling Association, Memphis, Mexico, and for Pro Wrestling USA.

== Personal life ==
Romero was the son of wrestler Ricky Romero, and the brother of wrestlers Chris and Mark Youngblood. He was married at the time of his death and left behind a son, Daniel, and a daughter, Ricca.

== Death ==
During a wrestling tour of the South Pacific, Youngblood was experiencing abdominal pain and went to the hospital where he was diagnosed with hemorrhagic pancreatitis. He started to develop abdominal sepsis and kidney failure before suffering a series of heart attacks. He was in a coma for two weeks before dying on September 2, 1985, in Parkville, Victoria, Australia, aged 30. Before his death, Youngblood had purchased a house in Charlottesville, Virginia.

== Championships and accomplishments ==
- All Japan Pro Wrestling
  - World's Strongest Tag Determination League New Wave Award (1982) – with Ricky Steamboat
- Cauliflower Alley Club
  - Family Wrestling Award (2015) – with Ricky Romero, Mark Youngblood, and Chris Youngblood
- Championship Wrestling from Florida
  - NWA United States Tag Team Championship (Florida version) (2 times) – with Mark Youngblood
- Maple Leaf Wrestling
  - NWA Canadian Television Championship (1 time)
- Mid-Atlantic Championship Wrestling
  - NWA Mid-Atlantic Tag Team Championship (3 times) – with Porkchop Cash (1), Johnny Weaver (1) and Ricky Steamboat (1)
  - NWA World Tag Team Championship (Mid-Atlantic version) (5 times) - with Ricky Steamboat
- NWA All-Star Wrestling
  - NWA Canadian Tag Team Championship (Vancouver version) (1 time) – with Joe Ventura
  - NWA Pacific Coast Heavyweight Championship (Vancouver version) (1 time) (last)
- Pacific Northwest Wrestling
  - NWA Pacific Northwest Heavyweight Championship (4 times)
  - NWA Pacific Northwest Tag Team Championship (1 time) – with Joe Lightfoot
  - Salem City Tournament (1981)
- Pro Wrestling Illustrated
  - Ranked No. 308 of the top 500 singles wrestlers in the "PWI Years" in 2003
  - Ranked No. 19 of the 100 best tag teams of the "PWI Years" with Ricky Steamboat in 2003
- Western States Sports
  - NWA Western States Tag Team Championship (1 time) - with Ricky Romero
- Wrestling Observer Newsletter
  - Tag Team of the Year (1983) with Ricky Steamboat

== See also ==
- List of premature professional wrestling deaths
