= By Fair Means or Foul =

1988 video game

By Fair Means or Foul aka Pro Boxing Simulator
- Developers: Michael Simpson, Terry Simpson (BBC/Electron); Jason Benham (C64); Charles Goodwin (Spectrum/CPC); Shane O'Brien (Amiga/ST)
- Publishers: Superior/Acornsoft; Superior/Alligata; Codemasters
- Designers: Michael Simpson, Terry Simpson
- Platforms: Acorn Electron, Amiga, Amstrad CPC, Atari ST, BBC Micro, Commodore 64, ZX Spectrum
- Release: 1988 (8-bit); 1991 (Amiga/ST)
- Genres: Fighting, sports
- Modes: Single-player, multiplayer

By Fair Means or Foul (later also released as Pro Boxing Simulator) is a boxing video game first published for a range of 8-bit home computers in 1988 by Superior Software. It was later reissued with the new title by Codemasters who also published conversions for 16-bit computers. The game offers a variety of boxing moves including fouls. The game received mixed reviews.

== Gameplay ==
In game shot (Amstrad CPC). The red player outline in the top corner indicates Player 2 is being watched by the referee.

The game can be played either as a two-player versus game or single-player against the computer. The objective of the one player game is to attempt to become the World Champion by defeating six opponents. The opponents become progressively more difficult to beat. The player can then continue to defend their title against difficult opponents.

The game features a wide range of moves including fair moves (punches, jabs, uppercuts) and foul moves (kicks, knees, head butts, groin punches) as well as blocks and dodging moves. Foul moves can be made when the referee is not looking but lead to a loss of 'chance' (or life) if seen. Indicators on screen let the player know when the referee is likely to notice foul moves. Successful hits reduce the opponent's energy bar. When the energy bar reaches zero, the player is knocked out but this just ends the round. The player with the lowest energy at the end of the round loses a 'chance'.

As the game is played, members of the audience make comments which are shown on screen as speech bubbles.

== Development and release ==
The game was originally developed by Michael and Terry Simpson for the BBC Micro and Acorn Electron. The game was converted to Commodore 64, Amstrad CPC and ZX Spectrum and launched simultaneously by Superior Software in 1988. The BBC and Electron versions were released under the joint Superior/Acornsoft name while the other versions were released under the Superior/Alligata name. All versions were released on cassette with all versions except the Electron also released on floppy disk.

Cover of Pro Boxing Simulator

The game was then released as a budget title by Codemasters in 1990 under the new title Pro Boxing Simulator (to fit with its long-running series). Controversially, this version had the words "New Release" on the cassette cover which led to complaints when people bought the game not realising it was the same as By Fair Means or Foul. Codemasters then reissued the game with the "New Release" box changed to "Previously known as 'Fair Means or Foul'" and offered to refund anyone who had bought both versions of the game.

Codemasters also converted the game to Amiga and Atari ST and these versions were released in 1991.

== Reception ==
Reviews were mixed. Electron User awarded the game 8/10, praising the fact it approaches boxing from a "different direction". Amstrad Action gave a score of 83%. Sinclair User gave a generally positive review picking out good points including "the wide variety of fighting moves, the decent sound effects and music, the comments from the crowd and the ref" but said the game was not "smooth or novel enough to make you scream with joy" awarding an overall score of 68%.

Zzap!64 said the game "can't be faulted" as a boxing simulation but cited the "badly drawn" and "blocky" graphics, giving a score of 66%. Your Sinclair gave the game an overall score of 6/10 but complained of "poor graphics, unwieldy control, and painful speed". Amiga Force gave a score of 58% in a Codemasters retrospective in 1994, labelling the game "engaging".

Computer and Video Games (testing the Amstrad version) gave a score of only 36%, again criticising the "blocky" and "sparse" graphics but also only giving a score of 2/5 for playability.
