= Liberation: Captive 2 =

1993 video game

- Amiga CD cover art
- Developer: Byte Engineers
- Publisher: Mindscape
- Designer: Tony Crowther
- Composer: Mark Knight
- Platforms: Amiga, Amiga CD32
- Release: December 15, 1993
- Genre: Role-playing
- Mode: Single-player

Liberation: Captive 2 is an Amiga role-playing video game that was written by Byte Engineers and published by Mindscape in 1993. It is the sequel to Captive.

Liberation was released for the Amiga computer. It was one of the few titles first released on the Amiga CD32, although not originally designed to be a system exclusive. Specifically, this version features long cut-scenes, voice acting, and a CD-quality soundtrack - the title of which has been re-recorded by the original composer for the Amiga Immortal 4 remix CD.

The game has some similarities with Hired Guns; both games have a dark cyberpunk setting. However, the object of Liberation is to find and free a prisoner by gathering clues and following leads. The game world is a very large city containing hundreds of fully explorable households, offices and public buildings. This vast setting precludes a brute force approach to finding the captive, and gives rise to the core gameplay element of detective work.

In line with its nominal classification as a role-playing video game, Liberation features typical role-playing tropes such as inventories, character upgrades, shops, money, and banks. Almost all world features are interactive: the libraries contain large volumes of real information the player must use, the police enforce the law and have working police stations and cells, the taxis are functional, and the player can deal drugs with the drug dealers.

== Reception ==
Reception

Review score
Publication	Score
Edge	8/10

Amiga Power gave the Amiga CD32 version 91%, praising the game's massive size, depth of options, open-ended gameplay, and longevity, summarizing that "You never seem to run out of new things to do and new things to try." Their only complaint with the game was that it requires a mouse to be played properly, since the standard Amiga CD32 controller does not work well with it. They gave the Amiga 1200 port 89%, saying it lacks the sound effects and music of the original but retains the core elements that make it enjoyable.
