= Potty Pigeon =

1984 video game

- Cover art
- Developer: Gremlin Graphics
- Publisher: Gremlin Graphics
- Designer: Shaun Hollingworth
- Programmers: Shaun Hollingworth; Antony Crowther (C64)
- Platforms: ZX Spectrum (original); Commodore 64
- Release: 1984
- Genre: Action
- Mode: Single-player

Percy the Potty Pigeon (also known simply as Potty Pigeon) is a computer game written by Shaun Hollingworth for the ZX Spectrum and published by Gremlin Graphics in 1984.

== Versions ==
The Commodore 64 version was programmed by Antony Crowther. There are 2 versions of the game. In the C64 version the goal is to fly around and collect sticks to build a nest whereas the Spectrum version required worms collecting and feeding the chicks (although if the player tries to drop an egg on an enemy, they lose the worm). The player can defecate on cars and make them crash.

This game marks the beginning of Ben Daglish as a composer. Although all he did was write the notes for the death tune, this is still the game that got him into composing game music for the Commodore 64.

== Reception ==
Reception

Review scores
Publication	Score
Crash	70%
Sinclair User	6/10
Commodore User	13/20

Percy the Potty Pigeon received mixed reception from video game critics.
