= Outlander (video game) =

1993 video game

- Developer: Mindscape
- Publisher: Mindscape
- Composer: Mark Knight (SNES)
- Platforms: Genesis, Super NES
- Release: Genesis: NA: March 1993; Super NES: NA: April 1993
- Mode: Single-player

Outlander is an action driving video game with a post-apocalyptic theme. It was developed and published by Mindscape in 1993 for the Sega Genesis and Super Nintendo Entertainment System.

== Gameplay ==
In Outlander, the player drives along a post-apocalyptic road in either first-person view (Genesis) or third-person (Super NES). Bikers and trucks attack the player's car with gunfire or ramming. To fend them off, a car window is displayed allowing the player to fire a shotgun to the left or right. The car is also armed with a forward-firing machine-gun. Enemy vehicles destroyed in this way result in an explosion that may damage the player's car.

The car's fuel is consumed over time, and the player may either stop to refill, or run out of fuel. In either case, on-foot gameplay ensues. In this section, the player must avoid chain or petrol-bomb wielding bikers, landmines, and armed hillbillies. There is also opportunity to collect health, fuel, and ammunition before returning to the car.

The player may also stop at towns, another on-foot section that allows resource gathering. Items include ammunition, food, water, fuel, surface-to-air missiles, armour, windshields, fuzzy toys, tires, and geiger counters. The geiger counter is used to detect contaminated food.

== Development ==
It was originally developed under the title The Road Warrior, based on the film of the same name; however, Mindscape lost the rights to the license when the game was almost complete, they removed any references to the film and changed the title to Outlander to avoid legal issues.

== Reception ==
Reception

Review score
Publication	Score
Mega	20%
