= Moonstone: A Hard Days Knight =

1991 video game

- Developer: Rob Anderson
- Publisher: Mindscape
- Programmers: Rob Anderson; Kevin Hoare
- Artists: Rob Anderson; Dennis Turner
- Composer: Richard Joseph
- Platforms: Amiga, MS-DOS
- Release: EU: 1991 (Amiga); EU: 1992 (MS-DOS)
- Genre: Action role-playing
- Modes: Single-player, multiplayer

Moonstone: A Hard Days Knight is an action role-playing video game by Canadian independent developer Rob Anderson and published by Mindscape for the Amiga in 1991. A version for MS-DOS, with different sound and music, followed in 1992. The title is a play on A Hard Day's Night.

Moonstone's gameplay blends several different genres, allowing up to four players to participate in a basic turn based game with real time combat for any encounters. The game contains some particularly bloody fight and death scenes.

Magazine advertisements for Moonstone claimed it contained 'nearly' a thousand frames of animation for two megabytes of monsters and over 60 different painted backdrops.

== Gameplay ==
The player takes on the role of a chosen knight who is sent by druids to return the mystical 'moonstone' to Stonehenge. The game supports between one and four players at once, with the computer controlling any knights not controlled by human players as rival NPCs. Gameplay consists of two distinct modes: turn-based exploration and real-time combat.

In turn-based mode each player can move a limited distance on the game's world map and visit various locations. Players will mostly visit the many dolmens that are scattered across the map. These places represent areas guarded by monsters. Visiting these dolmens will trigger the second main gameplay mode: real-time combat. Players take control of their chosen knights and attempt to defeat the monsters using sword combat similar to Barbarian: The Ultimate Warrior or Sword of Sodan.

Defeating the monsters rewards the player with treasures from that location. Success will also result in gaining one experience point (XP). These then can be distributed in one of the three abilities: Strength, Constitution and Endurance. The required amount of XP needed to advance varies according to the number of human-controlled characters. This, combined with some powerful weapons that can be discovered or bought, can boost the player's combat abilities. However, the difficulty of the game increases to compensate.

The game's objective is to find the lair that holds one of the four keys. The player who gathers together all four keys (either by finding them or by stealing them from rivals) will have access to the Valley of the Gods at the center of the map. The knight will have to fight against the Guardian in order to win a 'moonstone'. The moonstone corresponds randomly to a lunar phase, and grants the knight more power during that phase. The moonstone must be returned to Stonehenge for the game to be completed.

After some days, a dragon will appear and make regular sweeps across the land. In the event that an unskilled player is unfortunate enough to encounter the dragon early on in the game, defeat is almost inevitable.

== Development ==
In interview Todd Prescott discussed game's concept he stated the game was "a combination of Dungeons & Dragons and the board games, Talisman and Dark Tower." The game's combat was heavily influenced by the action game Barbarian.

== Reception ==
Reception

Review scores
Publication	Score
Amiga Action	90%
Amiga Computing	89%
Amiga Force	80%
Amiga Format	59%
Amiga Format	72%
Amiga Power	73%
Amiga Power	74%
CU Amiga	81%
CU Amiga	86%
The One Amiga	52%
The One for Amiga Games	82%

When the game was released, it got quite positive reviews from some magazines while some reviewers did not like it at all. Moonstone was banned in Germany due to gameplay being conceived as extremely violent at the time and failed to find a distributor for the US market as well. These days the game has a large cult following among vintage gamers. The game is highly sought after as a collectible. The game was put on the German index by the BPjS.

The One gave the Amiga version of Moonstone an overall score of 82%, praising its graphics and sound effects, calling the introduction "wonderfully animated" and the game's sprites "beautifully animated", furthermore stating that Moonstone is "pleasing to the eye and the ear". The One criticises the hack-and-slash gameplay as somewhat repetitive, but praises the special combat moves, expressing "they open up a good deal more options than the slash 'em up fan is usually presented with".
