= William Wobbler =

1985 video game

- Cover art
- Developer: Antony Crowther
- Publisher: Wizard Development
- Designer: Antony Crowther
- Platforms: Commodore 64, ZX Spectrum
- Release: NA: 1985; EU: 1985
- Genre: Adventure
- Mode: Single-player

William Wobbler is a video game developed by Antony Crowther and released by Wizard Development in 1985 for the Commodore 64 and ZX Spectrum.

== Gameplay ==
Title screen

The player must guide William to find ten pieces of a puzzle, hidden throughout a vast landscape of caverns.

== Competition ==
The game was distributed with a second disk labelled "Competition Disk." When the game was completed, a file was to be saved to this disk and sent to Wizard Development who awarded an undisclosed prize for the first entry received.

The game's author stated in 2014 that the prize was never claimed. No definite solution to the puzzle is known.
