= AWA America's Championship =

Professional wrestling championship

Details
- Promotion: American Wrestling Association
- Date established: January 7, 1985
- Date retired: August 26, 1985
Statistics
- First champion: Larry Zbyszko
- Longest reign: Sgt. Slaughter (165 days)
- Shortest reign: Larry Zbyszko (66 days)
- Oldest champion: Sgt. Slaughter (36 years, 9 months, 25 days)
- Youngest champion: Larry Zbyszko (32 years)
- Heaviest champion: Sgt. Slaughter 286 lb (130 kg; 20.4 st)
- Lightest champion: Larry Zbyszko 245 lb (111 kg; 17.5 st)

The AWA America's Championship was a very short-lived title in the American Wrestling Association that was created to play upon Sgt. Slaughter's patriotism. It lasted for shortly until 1985.

== Title history ==
Key
No.	Overall reign number
Reign	Reign number for the specific champion
Days	Number of days held

No.	Champion	Championship change			Reign statistics		Notes	Ref.
No.	Champion	Date	Event	Location	Reign	Days	Notes	Ref.
1	Larry Zbyszko	January 7, 1985	AWA House Show	Memphis, TN	1	165	Won a tournament final.	
2	Sgt. Slaughter	June 21, 1985	AWA House show	Chicago, IL	1	66		
—	Deactivated	August 26, 1985	—	—	—	—	Sgt. Slaughter left the AWA.	
Championship history is unrecorded from September 1985 to August 1991.

== See also ==
- American Wrestling Association
