= Mindscape (company) =

Video game company

- Logo used from 1994 to 2000
- Type: Private
- Industry: Video games
- Founded: October 1983; 42 years ago in Northbrook, Illinois, US
- Founder: Roger Buoy
- Defunct: August 2011; 15 years ago
- Fate: Liquidation
- Headquarters: Boulogne-Billancourt, France
- Parent: SFN Companies (1983–1987); The Software Toolworks (1990–1994); Pearson plc (1994–1998); The Learning Company (1998–2001)

Mindscape was a video game developer and publisher. The company was founded by Roger Buoy in October 1983 in Northbrook, Illinois, originally as part of SFN Companies until a management buyout was completed in 1987. Mindscape went public in 1988 and was acquired in 1990 by The Software Toolworks, eyeing Mindscape's Nintendo license. When Toolworks was acquired by Pearson plc in 1994, Mindscape became the primary identity for the development group. Mindscape was then sold to The Learning Company (TLC) in 1998. After TLC's sale to Mattel and then Gores Technology Group, the Mindscape name was phased out in January 2001. Jean-Pierre Nordman reformed the company later that year in Boulogne-Billancourt, France. Following the poor performance of its products, Mindscape exited the video game industry in August 2011 and was liquidated. Notable titles released by Mindscape include the MacVenture series, Balance of Power, Moonstone: A Hard Days Knight, Legend, Warhammer: Shadow of the Horned Rat, Warhammer: Dark Omen, and Lego Island.

== History ==
=== Early years (1983–1988) ===
Mindscape was founded in October 1983 by the Australian entrepreneur Roger Buoy as a wholly owned subsidiary of the holding company SFN Companies. Buoy had previously been a computer analyst for Rolls-Royce and later worked for the software division of Scholastic Inc. before SFN hired him. He acted as the president and chief executive officer (CEO) of Mindscape, and the company released its first product in April 1984. Early games include Déjà Vu, Balance of Power, and Sub Mission: A Matter of Life and Death. In its early years, Mindscape lost about US$6 million annually.

In July 1986, Mindscape acquired the assets of Scarborough Systems, a software company from Tarrytown, New York. Scarborough Systems continued its operations through Lifeboat Associates, a subsidiary that Mindscape did not buy. In October, SFN announced that it would sell or close large parts of its business, including plans to liquidate Mindscape. On December 31, Mindscape bought the assets of Learning Well in Roslyn, New York. Since Mindscape was not liquidated by the end of 1986, it was assigned to SFN Partners L.P., a limited partnership company. A new corporation set up by Buoy and SFN's former president and chairman, John Purcell, bought Mindscape from SFN Partners on January 16, 1987, for $3 million. Buoy retained his positions, while Purcell became Mindscape's chairman. Around this time, the company had 74 employees.

With sales of $12 million, Mindscape was profitable for the first time in the fourth quarter of 1986; it started publishing black numbers by 1987. In early 1987, Mindscape introduced the Thunder Mountain label to produce software at a lower price, starting with Rambo: First Blood Part II. In March 1987, Mindscape acquired the software division of Holt, Rinehart and Winston formerly known as CBS Interactive Learning, with all operations transferred to Mindscape's Northbrook, Illinois, headquarters. By June 1988, Mindscape had filed with the U.S. Securities and Exchange Commission to prepare an initial public offering (IPO) and become a public company. The move aimed at raising $9.6 million through sale of stock to reduce bank loan debts of $9.8 million. The IPO was completed later that month, with the company beginning trading over-the-counter by July. Bob Ingersoll and Dennis O'Malley were appointed the vice president (VP) of marketing and VP of sales, respectively, in May 1987. In November, Mindscape signed a lease of 21,000 square feet (2,000 m^{2}) of office space in Wheeling, Illinois, for $236,000. Robert A. Drell, formerly of Dresher Inc., became the VP of finance and chief financial officer in October 1988.

=== Under The Software Toolworks and Pearson (1989–2001) ===
In December 1989, the video game company The Software Toolworks reached an agreement to acquire Mindscape, exchanging every Mindscape share for 0.4375 shares in newly issued Toolworks common stock. The deal was completed on March 13, 1990, and valued at $21.2 million. A major driver for the acquisition was Mindscape's license to develop for Nintendo platforms, of which there were only approximately forty at the time. The two companies merged, and Buoy joined Les Crane on Toolworks's board of directors. Following the acquisition, Mindscape became Toolworks's division working exclusively on games for Nintendo platforms, which sharply increased Toolworks's earnings. In March 1994, Pearson plc agreed to acquire Toolworks for $462 million, finalizing the deal on May 12, 1994. Pearson was criticized for overpaying in the acquisition, and the acquired operations lost Pearson $69 million during its first few years thereafter.

By November 1994, the Toolworks name was discontinued in favor of the Mindscape brand. Mindscape acquired the video game developer Strategic Simulations in the same year, followed by Micrologic Software of Emeryville, California, in September 1995. In January 1996, John F. Moore became Mindscape's CEO after leaving the same position at Western Publishing. In November, Mindscape laid off twelve developed staff as a cost reduction measure. During 1997, Mindscape's final year under Pearson, it acquired the software company Multimedia Design and became profitable again, earning $2.7 million. One day prior to the release of Lego Island that year, Mindscape fired all of the development team which worked on the game to avoid paying them any bonuses.

Pearson sold Mindscape to The Learning Company (TLC) for $150 million in cash and stock in March 1998, after the Federal Trade Commission lifted its waiting period. TLC expected that its stock would rise $0.05 per share as a result of the acquisition, while Pearson lost around $347 million. Later that year, Mindscape acquired the Petz developer PF.Magic and, when TLC folded its Broderbund division, absorbed its productivity, reference and entertainment brands. TLC was acquired by Mattel in May 1999, which sold it to Gores Technology Group in October 2000. Gores reorganized TLC's entertainment assets under Game Studios in January 2001, dropping the Mindscape name, before selling them to Ubi Soft in March.

=== Mindscape SA (2001–2010) ===
In October 2001, Jean-Pierre Nordman, a former executive of TLC's Edusoft subsidiary, purchased TLC's remaining international assets from Gores and reorganized them under Mindscape SA, a new entity in Boulogne-Billancourt, France, a suburb of Paris. In November 2002, the company purchased the assets of the bankrupt software publisher Montparnasse Multimedia. In October 2005, Mindscape purchased the French game company Coktel Vision from Vivendi Universal Games, absorbing its eleven employees. Mindscape bought Violet out of liquidation in October 2009 and took over the production of the Nabaztag smart device range, announcing its third generation, Karotz, in October 2010. In December, now under the leadership of Thierry Bensoussan, the company opened an internal development studio, Punchers Impact, in Paris with forty staffers. The studio's managers, Guillaume Descamps and Jérôme Amouyal, departed in September 2010 to found Birdies Road.

Punchers Impact's karaoke game U-Sing did not meet sales expectations due to expensive music licenses, while the racing game Crashers did not sell well. Mindscape Asia-Pacific was sold off in 2010. In June 2011, Mindscape was placed into insolvency after failing to reach a deal with its lawyers and banks to pay off its accrued debts, announcing an impending restructuring process. On August 10, the company announced its exit from the video game industry by closing Punchers Impact and laying off its forty employees. The tribunal de commerce in Nanterre turned Mindscape's insolvency into a judicial liquidation. Aldebaran Robotics, the makers of the Nao robot range, bought Mindscape's robotic assets in November, while Mark Huijmans and colleague bought out Mindscape B.V., the Benelux division. Huijmans became that company's sole owner in 2013. Keeping its name, Mindscape B.V. took on the distribution for games by GameMill Entertainment, Microids, and U&I Entertainment.

== Software developed and/or published ==
| Title | Year(s) | Platform(s) |
|---|---|---|
| Racter | 1984 | IBM PC |
| Balance of Power | 1985 | Amiga, Apple II, Atari ST, Macintosh, MS-DOS, MSX, PC-88, PC-98, Windows |
| Déjà Vu | 1985 | Amiga, Apple IIGS, Atari ST, Commodore 64, Macintosh, MS-DOS, PC-9800, Pocket PC, Windows |
| James Bond 007: A View to a Kill | 1985 | Apple II, Macintosh, MS-DOS |
| Rock'n Wrestle | 1985 | Commodore 64, MS-DOS |
| Mindscape Amiga Tutorial | 1985 | Amiga (included on Workbench 1.1 disk) |
| American Challenge: A Sailing Simulation | 1986 | Apple II, Commodore 64, MS-DOS |
| James Bond 007: Goldfinger | 1986 | Apple II, IBM PC, Macintosh |
| Trailblazer | 1986 | Amiga, Atari 8-bit, Atari ST, Commodore 64, Commodore 16, Plus/4 |
| Uninvited | 1986 | Amiga, Apple IIGS, Atari ST, Commodore 64, Macintosh, MS-DOS, Pocket PC, Windows |
| Indiana Jones in Revenge of the Ancients | 1987 | Apple II, Macintosh, MS-DOS |
| Shadowgate | 1987 | Amiga, Apple IIGS, Atari ST, Game Boy Color, Mac, mobile phone, MS-DOS, NES, Palm OS, Pocket PC, Windows |
| Mavis Beacon Teaches Typing | 1987 | Macintosh, Windows |
| Road Runner | 1987 | Commodore 64, MS-DOS |
| Harrier Combat Simulator | 1987 | Amiga, Atari ST, Commodore 64, IBM PC |
| Visions of Aftermath: The Boomtown | 1988 | MS-DOS |
| Willow | 1988 | Amiga, Atari ST, Commodore 64, MS-DOS |
| The Colony | 1988 | Amiga, Macintosh, MS-DOS |
| Indiana Jones and the Temple of Doom | 1988 | NES |
| Paperboy | 1988, 1990 | Commodore 64, Game Boy, MS-DOS, NES |
| Star Trek V: The Final Frontier | 1989 | MS-DOS |
| Fiendish Freddy's Big Top o' Fun | 1989 | Amiga, Amstrad CPC, Commodore 64, ZX Spectrum |
| Prince of Persia | 1989 | NES |
| Sgt. Slaughter's Mat Wars | 1989 | Commodore 64 |
| Captive | 1990 | Amiga, Atari ST, MS-DOS |
| SimEarth | 1990 | Amiga |
| Mad Max | 1990 | NES |
| SimAnt | 1991 | Amiga |
| Moonstone: A Hard Days Knight | 1991 | Amiga, MS-DOS |
| Knightmare | 1991 | Amiga, Atari ST |
| Captain America and The Avengers | 1991 | Super NES, Game Boy, Game Gear |
| Captain Planet and the Planeteers | 1991 | Amiga, Atari ST |
| Gods | 1991 | Sega Genesis, Super NES |
| D/Generation | 1991 | Amiga, Amiga CD32, Atari ST, MS-DOS |
| Contraption Zack | 1992 | Amiga, MS-DOS |
| SimLife | 1992 | Amiga |
| The Terminator | 1992 | NES |
| Legend (aka The Four Crystals of Trazere) | 1992 | Amiga, Atari ST, MS-DOS |
| Worlds of Legend: Son of the Empire | 1993 | Amiga, MS-DOS |
| Wing Commander | 1993 | Amiga, Super NES |
| Super Battleship | 1993 | Sega Genesis, Super NES |
| Star Wars Chess | 1993 | MS-DOS, Sega CD, Windows |
| Outlander | 1993 | Sega Genesis, Super NES |
| Metal Marines | 1993 | Windows |
| The Chessmaster 4000 Turbo | 1993 | Macintosh, Windows |
| Dragon Lore: The Legend Begins | 1994 | 3DO, MS-DOS |
| Liberation: Captive 2 | 1994 | Amiga, Amiga CD32 |
| Aliens: A Comic Book Adventure | 1995 | MS-DOS |
| Cyberspeed | 1995 | PlayStation, Windows (unreleased) |
| Warhammer: Shadow of the Horned Rat | 1995 | PlayStation, Windows (unreleased) |
| Pool Champion | 1995 | Windows |
| Angel Devoid: Face of the Enemy | 1996 | Macintosh, MS-DOS |
| Azrael's Tear | 1996 | MS-DOS |
| Chessmaster 5000 | 1996 | Windows |
| Creatures | 1996 | Macintosh, Windows |
| Starwinder | 1996 | PlayStation |
| Steel Harbinger | 1996 | PlayStation |
| Counter Action | 1997 | MS-DOS |
| Lego Island | 1997 | Windows |
| Aaron vs. Ruth: Battle of the Big Bats | 1997 | Windows |
| John Saul's Blackstone Chronicles | 1998 | Windows |
| Warhammer: Dark Omen | 1998 | PlayStation, Windows |
| Prince of Persia 3D | 1999 | Windows |
| Rat Attack! | 1999 | Nintendo 64, PlayStation, Windows |
| Billy Hatcher and the Giant Egg | 2006 | Windows |
| Golden Balls | 2008 | Nintendo DS, Wii |
