= Troy Graham =

American professional wrestler (1949–2002)

Personal information
- Born: Troy Rolland Thompson Jr. October 26, 1949 Memphis, Tennessee, U.S.
- Died: March 7, 2002 (aged 52)
- Cause of death: Heart attack

Professional wrestling career
- Ring name(s): The Dream Machine; Dr. Troy Graham; Randy Tyler; Troy Graham; Troy T. Tyler
- Billed height: 5 ft 11 in (1.80 m)
- Billed weight: 233 lb (106 kg)
- Billed from: Memphis, Tennessee, U.S.
- Debut: 1978
- Retired: 1994

Troy Rolland Thompson Jr. (October 26, 1949 – March 7, 2002) was an American professional wrestler, better known by the ring names Troy Graham and The Dream Machine.

== Professional wrestling career ==
Thompson was discovered by Jimmy Hart and first came into wrestling as Troy 'The Hippie' Graham. During his initial career, he fulfilled the role of a heel.

Wrestling as the masked Dream Machine, Thompson captured the AWA Southern Heavyweight Championship in 1981 after defeating Steve Keirn in the final bout of a one-night tournament. Promoter Eddie Marlin awarded the belt to Dream Machine and his manager Jimmy Hart during an episode of Championship Wrestling that aired soon after the tournament. Also in 1981, Thompson held the AWA Southern Tag Team Championship title while teamed with "Superstar" Bill Dundee. They were defeated by Kevin Sullivan and Wayne Farris during a televised match on May 2, 1981.

From 1982 to 1983, Thompson teamed with Porkchop Cash as The Bruise Brothers, as part of Hart's First Family stable. They defeated Dutch Mantell and Koko B. Ware for their first AWA Southern Tag Team Championship titles. They also went on to compete against the Rock 'n' Roll Express, exchanging the Southern Tag Team Titles with them.

As the Dream Machine, Thompson (sans mask) was one-half of the tag team known as "The New York Dolls". The Dolls had a longstanding feud with the Fabulous Ones, Steve Keirn and Stan Lane.

In 1984 Troy Graham was replaced in the Bruise Brothers and left the Memphis territory.

Graham reappeared in the Memphis territory, in a wheelchair, as the manager of the Interns. The Interns feuded with the Dirty White Boys and Rock n Roll RPMs. The Interns won the Southern tag titles early in 1985.

In 1994, Graham returned to the Memphis territory, where he won a battle royal by eliminating Brian Christopher. This earned him a shot at the Unified World Heavyweight Championship held by Jerry Lawler.

Troy Graham died on March 7, 2002, of a heart attack, leaving behind a seven-year-old daughter Charlie Sue, his mother and great grandmother.

== Championships and accomplishments ==
- Memphis Wrestling Hall of Fame
  - Class of 2022
- Continental Wrestling Association
  - AWA Southern Heavyweight Championship (3 times)
  - AWA Southern Tag Team Championship (4 times) – with Porkchop Cash (2 times) and Bill Dundee (2 times)
- Southeastern Championship Wrestling
  - NWA Southeastern Television Championship (1 time)
- United States Wrestling Association
  - USWA Heavyweight Championship (1 time)
- World Wrestling Association
  - WWA World Tag Team Championship (1 time) – with Rick McGraw
