= AWA Southern Tag Team Championship =

Professional wrestling tag team championship

- The last version of the championship belt

Details
- Promotion: NWA Mid-America (1945–1977); Continental Wrestling Association (1977–1988)
- Date established: November 1945
- Date retired: February 1, 1988

Other name
- NWA Southern Tag Team Championship (Mid-America)
Statistics
- First champions: Garza Lozano and Jack Purdin
- Most reigns: Team: The Fabulous Ones (Stan Lane and Steve Keirn) (15 reigns) individual: Tojo Yamamoto (23 reigns)
- Longest reign: Jackie Fargo and Sonny Fargo (196 days)
- Shortest reign: Al Greene and Frank Martinez (Less than 1 day)

The AWA Southern Tag Team Championship was a professional wrestling tag team title in the Tennessee area from the 1940s through the late 1980s. It was originally named the NWA Southern Tag Team Championship (Mid-America version) from its inception through 1977, when it was renamed (as was the Southern Heavyweight Championship, also previously an NWA title) the AWA Southern Tag Team Championship due to a partnership with the American Wrestling Association. The title existed until 1988 when it was replaced with the Continental Wrestling Association Tag Team Championship.

The title was also referred to as the Mid-Southern Tag Team Championship to avoid confusion with the various other versions of the NWA Southern Tag Team Championship in Championship Wrestling from Florida (1960–1970), Georgia Championship Wrestling (1951–1968), Gulf Coast Championship Wrestling (1955–1966), Mid-Atlantic Championship Wrestling (1953–1969), and Southern Championship Wrestling (1981–1982).

== Reigns ==
Key
| No. | Overall reign number |
| Reign | Reign number for the specific champion |
| Days | Number of days held |
| N/A | Unknown information |
| (NLT) | Championship change took place "no later than" the date listed |

| No. | Champion | Championship change | | | Reign statistics | | Notes | Ref. |
| No. | Champion | Date | Event | Location | Reign | Days | Notes | Ref. |
|---|---|---|---|---|---|---|---|---|
Mid-Southern Tag Team Championship / NWA Southern Tag Team Championship
| 1 | Garza Lozano and Jack Purdin | November 26, 1945 | Live event | Birmingham, Alabama | 1 | (Note: The length of the reign is too uncertain to calculate.) | Defended against Nick Carter and Sailor Watkins in Birmingham on this day; may have defeated Herb Welch and Roy Welch for the title on April 30, 1945, in Birmingham, Alabama. | |
Championship history is unrecorded from November 26, 1945 to April 1948.
| 2 | Paul Stanlee and Jack Welch | April 1948 | Live event | (Note: The location of the match was not captured as part of the documentation.) | 1 | (Note: The date the championship was either won or lost has not been documented which means the championship reign lasted anywhere between 1 day and 89 days) | | |
Championship history is unrecorded from April 1948 to June 29, 1948.
| 3 | Mike Chacoma and Red Roberts | June 29, 1948 | Live event | Nashville, Tennessee | 1 | (Note: The date the championship was either won or lost has not been documented which means the championship reign lasted anywhere between 1 day and 147 days) | Defeated Herb and Roy Welch. | |
Championship history is unrecorded from June 29, 1948 to November 23, 1948.
| 4 | Tex Riley and Herb Welch | November 23, 1948 | Live event | | 1 | (Note: The date the championship was either won or lost has not been documented which means the championship reign lasted anywhere between 1 day and 80 days) | | |
Championship history is unrecorded from November 23, 1948 to February 11, 1949.
| 5 | Wild Bill Canny and Carlos Rodriguez Cortez | February 11, 1949 | Live event | | 1 | (Note: The date the championship was either won or lost has not been documented which means the championship reign lasted anywhere between 1 day and 300 days) | Still champions on March 7, 1949. | |
Championship history is unrecorded from February 11, 1949 to December 8, 1949.
| 6 | Wild Bill Canny(2) and Buddy Knox | December 8, 1949 | Live event | | 1 | (Note: The date the championship was either won or lost has not been documented which means the championship reign lasted anywhere between 1 day and 238 days) | | |
Championship history is unrecorded from December 8, 1949 to August 3, 1950.
| 7 | Eddie Gossett and Roy Welch | August 3, 1950 | Live event | | 1 | 104 | | |
| 8 | Masked Bat and Finis Hall | November 15, 1950 | Live event | Chattanooga, Tennessee | 1 | 36 | The Masked Bat was unmasked by Welch and revealed as Danny Dusek | |
| 9 | Eddie Gossett (2) and Tex Riley(2) | December 21, 1950 | Live event | Chattanooga, Tennessee | 1 | (Note: The date the championship was either won or lost has not been documented which means the championship reign lasted anywhere between 1 day and 202 days) | Still champions on January 4, 1951. | |
Championship history is unrecorded from December 21, 1950 to July 1951.
| 10 | Ray Piret and Herb Welch (2) | July 1951 | Live event | | 1 | | | |
| 11 | Eduardo Perez and Red Roberts (2) | July 12, 1951 | Live event | Chattanooga, Tennessee | 1 | (Note: The date the championship was either won or lost has not been documented which means the championship reign lasted anywhere between 1 day and 116 days) | | |
Championship history is unrecorded from July 12, 1951 to November 5, 1951.
| 12 | Ray Piret (2) and Tex Riley(3) | November 5, 1951 | Live event | | 1 | 43 | | |
| 13 | Pat O'Brien and Karl Kowalski | December 18, 1951 | Live event | Nashville, Tennessee | 1 | (Note: The date the championship was either won or lost has not been documented which means the championship reign lasted anywhere between 1 day and 134 days) | | |
Championship history is unrecorded from December 18, 1951 to April 1952.
| 14 | Henry Harrell and Rex Mobley | April 1952 | Live event | | 1 | (Note: The date the championship was either won or lost has not been documented which means the championship reign lasted anywhere between 1 day and 10 days) | | |
| 15 | Golden Hawk and Johnny Kostas | April 17, 1952 | Live event | Chattanooga, Tennessee | 1 | (Note: The date the championship was either won or lost has not been documented which means the championship reign lasted anywhere between 1 day and 37 days) | | |
Championship history is unrecorded from April 17, 1952 to May 24, 1952.
| 16 | Karl Kowalski (2) and Ivan Kowalski | May 24, 1952 | Live event | Atlanta, Georgia | 1 | (Note: The date the championship was either won or lost has not been documented which means the championship reign lasted anywhere between 1 day and 105 days) | Reported on June 11, 1952, issue of a Cape Girardeau, MO paper to have defeated Masked Marvel and Paul Jones "three weeks ago"; most likely fictitious since the Atlanta results for this date lists neither team. | |
| 17 | Herb Welch (3) and Roy Welch (3) | 1952 | Live event | | 1 | (Note: The date the championship was either won or lost has not been documented which means the championship reign lasted anywhere between 1 day and 105 days) | Sometime after June 20, 1952. | |
| 18 | Karl Kowalski (3) and Ivan Kowalski | September 7, 1952 | Live event | Kingsport, Tennessee | 2 | 2 | | |
| 19 | Herb (4) and Roy Welch (4) | September 9, 1952 | Live event | | 2 | 365 | Still champions as of March 12, 1953. | |
| 20 | Al and John Smith | September 9, 1953 | Live event | | 1 | 262 | Still champions as of November 9, 1953; continue to be recognized in Charlotte. | |
| 21 | George and Jack Curtis | May 29, 1954 | Live event | Lenoir, North Carolina | 1 | 7 | | |
| 22 | Al and John Smith | June 5, 1954 | Live event | Lenoir, North Carolina | 2 | 44 | | |
| 23 | Mr. Moto and Kinji Shibuya | July 19, 1954 | Live event | Charlotte, North Carolina | 1 | 85 | | |
| 24 | George and Bobby Becker | October 12, 1954 | Live event | Roanoke, Virginia | 1 | (Note: The date the championship was either won or lost has not been documented which means the championship reign lasted anywhere between 45 and 93 days) | | |
| — | Vacated | November 26, 1954 | — | | — | — | | |
| 25 | Leo and Chick Garibaldi | June 1956 | Live event | | 1 | (Note: The date the championship was either won or lost has not been documented which means the championship reign lasted anywhere between 1 and 25 days) | Defends Charlotte version in Nashville. | |
| 26 | Jim Austeri and Tiny Mills | June 26, 1956 | Live event | Nashville, Tennessee | 1 | 83 | | |
| 27 | George Becker (2) and Jack Witzig | September 17, 1956 | Live event | Charlotte, North Carolina | 1 | (Note: The date the championship was either won or lost has not been documented which means the championship reign lasted anywhere between 1 day and 549 days) | Defends Charlotte version in Nashville; still recognized as of November 4, 1956. | |
Championship history is unrecorded from September 17, 1956 to March 1958.
| 28 | The Corsicans (Corsica Jean and Corsica Joe) | March 1958 | Live event | | 1 | (Note: The date the championship was either won or lost has not been documented which means the championship reign lasted anywhere between 1 and 20 days) | | |
| 29 | Herb Welch (5) and Chris Belkas | March 21, 1958 | Live event | Knoxville, Tennessee | 1 | 14 | | |
| 30 | The Corsicans (Corsica Jean and Corsica Joe) | April 4, 1958 | Live event | | 2 | 14 | | |
| 31 | Dick Beyer and Tex Riley(4) | April 18, 1958 | Live event | Knoxville, Tennessee | 1 | (Note: The date the championship was either won or lost has not been documented which means the championship reign lasted anywhere between 13 and 41 days) | | |
| 32 | The Corsicans (Corsica Jean and Corsica Joe) | May 1958 | Live event | | 3 | (Note: The date the championship was either won or lost has not been documented which means the championship reign lasted anywhere between 1 and 1 days) | | |
| 33 | Dick Beyer (2) and Len Rossi | May 30, 1958 | Live event | Knoxville, Tennessee | 1 | 49 | | |
| 34 | Mike and Doc Gallagher | July 18, 1958 | Live event | Knoxville, Tennessee | 1 | 77 | | |
| 35 | The Corsicans (Corsica Jean and Corsica Joe) | October 3, 1958 | Live event | Knoxville, Tennessee | 4 | (Note: The date the championship was either won or lost has not been documented which means the championship reign lasted anywhere between 1 day and 209 days) | | |
Championship history is unrecorded from October 3, 1958 to April 1959.
| 36 | Don and Luke Fields | April 1959 | Live event | | 1 | (Note: The date the championship was either won or lost has not been documented which means the championship reign lasted anywhere between 1 day and 193 days) | | |
Championship history is unrecorded from April 1959 to May 12, 1959.
| 38 | The Fabulous Fargos (Don and Jackie Fargo) | May 12, 1959 | Live event | | 1 | (Note: The date the championship was either won or lost has not been documented which means the championship reign lasted anywhere between 1 day and 193 days) | | |
| 39 | Tex Riley(5) and Len Rossi (2) | May 12, 1948 | Live event | | 1 | (Note: The date the championship was either won or lost has not been documented which means the championship reign lasted anywhere between 1 day and 193 days) | | |
Championship history is unrecorded from May 12, 1948 to July 1959.
| — | Vacated | July 1959 | — | — | — | — | | |
| 40 | Don and Luke Fields | October 13, 1959 | Live event | | 2 | 15 | | |
| 41 | John Smith (3) and Tosh Togo | October 28, 1959 | Live event | Mobile, Alabama | 1 | 14 | Defeated Bobby and Don Fields in a tournament final for the vacant Gulf Coast version; may not be recognized outside the territory. | |
| 42 | Bobby and Don Fields | November 11, 1959 | Live event | Mobile, Alabama | 3 | 54 | | |
| 43 | The Corsicans (Corsica Jean and Corsica Joe) | January 4, 1960 | Live event | | 5 | 49 | | |
| 44 | Bobby and Don Fields | February 22, 1960 | Live event | Memphis, Tennessee | 4 | 58 | | |
| 45 | Great Bolo and Joe McCarthy | April 20, 1960 | Live event | Mobile, Alabama | 1 | 5 | The Corsicas are billed as champions in Blytheville, Arkansas, as of March 7, 1960. | |
| 46 | Don and Luke Fields | April 25, 1960 | Live event | | 5 | (Note: The date the championship was either won or lost has not been documented which means the championship reign lasted anywhere between 251 and 257 days) | Still/again champions as of November 1, 1960. | |
| 47 | John (4) and Al Smith | January 1961 | Live event | | 3 | (Note: The date the championship was either won or lost has not been documented which means the championship reign lasted anywhere between 1 and 7 days) | | |
| 48 | Dante and Mephisto | January 8, 1961 | Live event | | 1 | 35 | | |
| 49 | Jackie Fargo (2) and Lester Welch | February 12, 1961 | Live event | Memphis, Tennessee | 1 | 28 | | |
| 50 | Dante and Mephisto | March 12, 1961 | Live event | Memphis, Tennessee | 2 | 163 | In Chattanooga, TN, Tex Rileyand Len Rossi are announced as having defeated Mephisto and Dante for the title "last week". | |
| 51 | Tex Riley(6) and Len Rossi (3) | August 22, 1961 | Live event | Nashville, Tennessee | 3 | 14 | | |
| 52 | Dante and Mephisto | September 5, 1961 | Live event | Nashville, Tennessee | 3 | 11 | In Chattanooga, Tennessee Riley and Rossi defend the title on September 9, 1961, although Mephisto and Dante are recognized prior to the match on September 16, 1961. | |
| 53 | Tex Riley(7) and Len Rossi (4) | September 16, 1961 | Live event | Chattanooga, Tennessee | 4 | 7 | | |
| 54 | Dante and Mephisto | September 23, 1961 | Live event | Chattanooga, Tennessee | 4 | 24 | | |
| 55 | Jackie Fargo (3) and Lester Welch (2) | October 17, 1961 | Live event | Nashville, Tennessee | 2 | 42 | | |
| 56 | Dante and Mephisto | November 28, 1961 | Live event | Chattanooga, Tennessee | 5 | 2 | | |
| 57 | Jackie Fargo (4) and Lester Welch (3) | November 30, 1961 | Live event | Chattanooga, Tennessee | 3 | 39 | | |
| 58 | Dante and Mephisto | January 8, 1962 | Live event | | 6 | 35 | | |
| 59 | Jackie Fargo (5) and Lester Welch (4) | February 12, 1962 | Live event | Memphis, Tennessee | 4 | 22 | | |
| 60 | Dante and Mephisto | March 6, 1962 | Live event | Chattanooga, Tennessee | 7 | 16 | | |
| 61 | Jackie Fargo (6) and Lester Welch (5) | March 22, 1962 | Live event | | 5 | 9 | | |
| 62 | Dante and Mephisto | March 31, 1962 | Live event | Chattanooga, Tennessee | 8 | 19 | | |
| 63 | Mike Clancy and Lester Welch (6) | April 19, 1962 | Live event | Chattanooga, Tennessee | 1 | (Note: The date the championship was either won or lost has not been documented which means the championship reign lasted anywhere between 73 and 80 days) | | |
| 64 | Dante and Mephisto | July 1962 | Live event | | 9 | (Note: The date the championship was either won or lost has not been documented which means the championship reign lasted anywhere between 1 and 8 days) | | |
| 65 | Don and Luke Fields | July 9, 1962 | Live event | Memphis, Tennessee | 6 | 49 | | |
| 66 | The Medics (Tony Gonzales and Donald Lortie) | August 27, 1962 | Live event | Memphis, Tennessee | 1 | 49 | Had already been billed as champions in Chattanooga on August 25, 1962. | |
| 67 | Buddy Fuller and Lester Welch (7) | October 15, 1962 | Live event | Memphis, Tennessee | 1 | 7 | | |
| 68 | The Medics (Tony Gonzales and Donald Lortie) | October 22, 1962 | Live event | Memphis, Tennessee | 2 | 22 | | |
| 69 | Jackie Fargo (7) and Tex Riley(9) | November 13, 1962 | Live event | Nashville, Tennessee | 1 | 14 | | |
| 70 | The Medics (Tony Gonzales and Donald Lortie) | November 27, 1962 | Live event | Nashville, Tennessee | 3 | 6 | | |
| 71 | Ray Andrews and Eric Pomeroy (Stan Pulaski) | December 3, 1962 | Live event | Memphis, Tennessee | 3 | 49 | Not recognized outside Memphis. | |
| 72 | The Medics (Tony Gonzales and Donald Lortie) | January 21, 1963 | Live event | Memphis, Tennessee | 4 | 15 | | |
| 73 | Don and Luke Fields | February 5, 1963 | Live event | Nashville, Tennessee | 7 | 15 | Held up after a match against Medics on February 12, 1963, in Nashville, Tennessee. | |
| 74 | The Medics (Tony Gonzales and Donald Lortie) | February 20, 1963 | Live event | Nashville, Tennessee | 5 | 48 | Win rematch; lose to Don Fields and Luke Fields on March 11, 1963, in Memphis, Tennessee, but continue to be recognized in other cities. | |
| 75 | Gino and Tony Calza | April 9, 1963 | Live event | Nashville, Tennessee | 1 | 34 | Recognized in Memphis, Tennessee, as of April 16, 1963. | |
| 76 | Karl and Skull Von Stroheim | May 13, 1963 | Live event | Memphis, Tennessee | 1 | 112 | | |
| 77 | Lester Welch (8) and Jackie Fargo (8) | September 2, 1963 | Live event | Memphis, Tennessee | 6 | 7 | Held up when Karl is taken to hospital after the second fall. | |
| 78 | Karl and Skull Von Stroheim | September 9, 1963 | Live event | Memphis, Tennessee | 2 | 57 | Win rematch. | |
| 79 | Jackie Fargo (9) and Mario Milano (1) | November 5, 1963 | Live event | Nashville, Tennessee | 1 | 30 | | |
| 80 | Ivan Malenkov and Tojo Yamamoto | December 5, 1963 | Live event | Chattanooga, Tennessee | 1 | 21 | | |
| 81 | Jackie Fargo (10) and Mario Milano (2) | December 26, 1963 | Live event | Chattanooga, Tennessee | 2 | 21 | Awarded the title when Malenkov leaves the area and does not appear for a scheduled defense. | |
| 82 | Karl and Skull Von Stroheim | January 16, 1964 | Live event | Chattanooga, Tennessee | 3 | 7 | Not recognized outside Chattanooga. | |
| 83 | Alex Perez and Tojo Yamamoto (2) | January 23, 1964 | Live event | Chattanooga, Tennessee | 1 | 54 | | |
| 84 | Jackie Fargo (11) and The Masked Rebel | March 17, 1964 | Live event | Nashville, Tennessee | 1 | 14 | | |
| 85 | Tojo Yamamoto (3) and Alex Perez | March 31, 1964 | Live event | Nashville, Tennessee | 2 | 16 | | |
| 86 | Jackie Fargo (12) and Sonny Fargo | April 16, 1964 | Live event | Chattanooga, Tennessee | 2 | 7 | | |
| 87 | Alex Perez and Tojo Yamamoto (4) | April 23, 1964 | Live event | Chattanooga, Tennessee | 3 | 33 | | |
| 88 | The Fabulous Fargos (Don (2) and Jackie Fargo (13)) | May 26, 1964 | Live event | Nashville, Tennessee | 2 | 14 | | |
| 89 | Alex Perez and Tojo Yamamoto (5) | June 9, 1964 | Live event | Nashville, Tennessee | 4 | 14 | Fargos are still billed as champions in Memphis, Tennessee, on June 15, 1964. | |
| 90 | Mario Milano (3) and Len Rossi (5) | June 23, 1964 | Live event | Nashville, Tennessee | 1 | 91 | | |
| 91 | The Corsicans (Corsica Jean and Corsica Joe) | September 22, 1964 | Live event | Bowling Green, Kentucky | 6 | 36 | | |
| 92 | Chief Little Bear and Mack York | October 28, 1964 | Live event | | 1 | 42 | | |
| 93 | Mitsu Hirai and Tojo Yamamoto (6) | December 9, 1964 | Live event | Bowling Green, Kentucky | 1 | 166 | | |
| 94 | Danny Hodge and Mario Milano (4) | May 24, 1965 | Live event | Memphis, Tennessee | 1 | 38 | | |
| 95 | Mitsu Hirai (2) and Tojo Yamamoto (7) | July 1, 1965 | Live event | | 2 | 12 | | |
| 96 | Frankie Cain and Mike Clancy | July 13, 1965 | Live event | Nashville, Tennessee | 1 | 14 | | |
| 97 | Alex Perez and Tojo Yamamoto (8) | July 27, 1965 | Live event | Nashville, Tennessee | 5 | 45 | | |
| 98 | Jackie Fargo (14) and Len Rossi (6) | September 10, 1965 | Live event | Jonesboro, Arkansas | 1 | 22 | | |
| 99 | Tor Kamata (2) and Tojo Yamamoto (9) | October 2, 1965 | Live event | Nashville, Tennessee | 1 | 17 | | |
| 100 | Jackie Fargo (15) and Len Rossi (7) | October 19, 1965 | Live event | Nashville, Tennessee | 2 | 37 | May not win the title but were again billed as champions in Chattanooga on November 11, 1965. | |
| 101 | The Mysterious Medics | November 25, 1965 | Live event | Chattanooga, Tennessee | 5 | 37 | Held up after a match against Hiro Matsuda and Kanji Inoki on November 28, 1965; still held up after a rematch on January 4, 1966, in Nashville, Tennessee. | |
| — | Vacated | December 1965 | — | — | — | — | | |
| 102 | Mario Milano (5) and Len Rossi (8) | January 11, 1966 | Live event | Nashville, Tennessee | 2 | 29 | Won a three-team tournament, defeating The Mysterious Medics and Inoki and Matsuda. | |
| 103 | Alex Perez and Tojo Yamamoto (10) | February 9, 1966 | Live event | Nashville, Tennessee | 6 | 6 | | |
| 104 | Mario Milano (6) and Len Rossi (9) | February 15, 1966 | Live event | Nashville, Tennessee | 3 | 45 | | |
| 105 | Doug Lindsey and Treach Phillips | April 1, 1966 | Live event | | 1 | 10 | | |
| 106 | Len Rossi (10) and Mario Milano (7) | April 11, 1966 | Live event | Birmingham, Alabama | 4 | 71 | | |
| 107 | The Great Higami and Tojo Yamamoto (11) | June 21, 1966 | Live event | Birmingham, Alabama | 1 | 10 | | |
| 108 | Mario Milano (8) and Len Rossi (11) | July 1, 1966 | Live event | | 5 | 120 | | |
| 109 | The Blue Infernos | October 29, 1966 | Live event | Nashville, Tennessee | 1 | 3 | Held up after a match against Chief White Eagle and Chuck Conley on November 18, 1966, in Chattanooga, Tennessee. | |
| 110 | The Blue Infernos | November 1, 1966 | Live event | | 2 | 57 | | |
| 111 | Corsica Joe (7) and Chin Lee | December 28, 1966 | Live event | Birmingham, Alabama | 1 | (Note: The date the championship was either won or lost has not been documented which means the championship reign lasted anywhere between 1 day and 155 days) | Still/again champions on April 12, 1967. | |
Championship history is unrecorded from December 28, 1966 to June 1, 1967.
| 112 | Rip and Tim Tyler | June 1, 1967 | Live event | | 1 | 11 | | |
| 113 | Billy and Jimmy Hines | June 12, 1967 | Live event | Birmingham, Alabama | 1 | (Note: The date the championship was either won or lost has not been documented which means the championship reign lasted anywhere between 1 day and 52 days) | | |
Championship history is unrecorded from June 12, 1967 to August 3, 1967.
| 114 | Tomayo Soto and The Great Yamaha | August 3, 1967 | Live event | | 1 | 7 | | |
| 115 | Len Rossi (12) and Bad Boy Hines | August 10, 1967 | Live event | Chattanooga, Tennessee | 1 | (Note: The date the championship was either won or lost has not been documented which means the championship reign lasted anywhere between 1 day and 81 days) | | |
Championship history is unrecorded from August 10, 1967 to October 1967.
| 116 | Len Rossi (13) and Tomayo Soto (2) | October 1967 | Live event | | 1 | (Note: The date the championship was either won or lost has not been documented which means the championship reign lasted anywhere between 1 day and 155 days) | | |
Championship history is unrecorded from October 1967 to March 4, 1968.
| 117 | Lester Welch (9) and Eddie Graham | March 4, 1968 | Live event | | 1 | (Note: The date the championship was either won or lost has not been documented which means the championship reign lasted anywhere between 1 day and 30 days) | | |
Championship history is unrecorded from March 4, 1968 to April 3, 1968.
| 118 | The Dirty Daltons (Frank Dalton and Jack Dalton) | April 3, 1968 | Live event | | 1 | (Note: The date the championship was either won or lost has not been documented which means the championship reign lasted anywhere between 1 day and 27 days) | | |
Championship history is unrecorded from April 3, 1968 to April 1968.
| — | Vacated | April 1968 | — | — | — | — | Championship vacated for undocumented reasons. | |
| 119 | Don Carson and The Red Shadow | April 1968 | Live event | Tampa, Florida | 1 | (Note: The date the championship was either won or lost has not been documented which means the championship reign lasted anywhere between 1 and 24 days) | Won a possibly fictitious tournament. | |
| 120 | Dennis Hall and Ken Lucas | April 25, 1968 | Live event | Chattanooga, Tennessee | 1 | 7 | | |
| 121 | Don Carson and The Red Shadow | May 2, 1968 | Live event | Chattanooga, Tennessee | 2 | (Note: The date the championship was either won or lost has not been documented which means the championship reign lasted anywhere between 1 and 10 days) | | |
| 122 | Lester Welch (10) and Eddie Graham (4) | May 1968 | Live event | | 2 | (Note: The date the championship was either won or lost has not been documented which means the championship reign lasted anywhere between 1 and 10 days) | | |
| 123 | Don Carson and The Red Shadow | May 13, 1968 | Live event | Memphis, Tennessee | 3 | 14 | | |
| 124 | Dennis Hall and Ken Lucas | May 27, 1968 | Live event | Memphis, Tennessee | 2 | 28 | | |
| 125 | Don Carson and The Red Shadow | June 24, 1968 | Live event | Memphis, Tennessee | 4 | 50 | | |
| 126 | Jackie Fargo (16) and Lou Thesz | August 13, 1968 | Live event | Memphis, Tennessee | 1 | 7 | | |
| 127 | Don Carson and The Red Shadow | August 20, 1968 | Live event | Memphis, Tennessee | 5 | 4 | | |
| 128 | Ken Lucas and Dennis Hall | August 24, 1968 | Live event | Chattanooga, Tennessee | 3 | (Note: The date the championship was either won or lost has not been documented which means the championship reign lasted anywhere between 1 and 15 days) | | |
| 129 | Don Carson and The Red Shadow | 1968 | Live event | | 6 | (Note: The date the championship was either won or lost has not been documented which means the championship reign lasted anywhere between 1 and 16 days) | | |
| 130 | Buddy Fuller and Lester Welch (11) | September 9, 1968 | Live event | Memphis, Tennessee | 2 | (Note: The date the championship was either won or lost has not been documented which means the championship reign lasted anywhere between 1 and 14 days) | | |
| 131 | Don Carson and The Red Shadow | September 1968 | Live event | | 7 | (Note: The date the championship was either won or lost has not been documented which means the championship reign lasted anywhere between 1 and 14 days) | | |
| 132 | Lester Welch (12) and Buddy Fuller | September 24, 1968 | Live event | Birmingham, Alabama | 3 | 6 | | |
| 133 | Don Carson and The Red Shadow | September 30, 1968 | Live event | Memphis, Tennessee | 8 | 10 | | |
| 134 | The Mighty Yankees (Mighty Yankee 1 and Mighty Yankee 2) | October 10, 1968 | Live event | Chattanooga, Tennessee | 1 | 39 | Carson and Shadow continue to be billed as champions in Chattanooga but lose to Mighty Yankees #1 (Eddie Sullivan) and #2 (Frank Morrell) on October 10, 1968. | |
| 135 | The Mighty Yankees (Mighty Yankee 1 and Mighty Yankee 3) | November 18, 1968 | Live event | Memphis, Tennessee | 1 | 42 | | |
| 136 | Bobby (7) and Lee Fields | December 30, 1968 | Live event | Memphis, Tennessee | 1 | 7 | | |
| 137 | The Mighty Yankees (Frank Morrell (3) and Eddie Sullivan (2)) | January 6, 1969 | Live event | Memphis, Tennessee | 2 | 12 | Or January 11, 1969, in Chattanooga, Tennessee. | |
| 138 | Dennis Hall and Ken Lucas | January 18, 1969 | Live event | Memphis, Tennessee | 3 | 12 | | |
| 139 | The Mighty Yankees (Frank Morrell (4) and Eddie Sullivan (3)) | January 30, 1969 | Live event | | 3 | 3 | | |
| 140 | Ken Lucas(4) and Johnny Walker | February 2, 1969 | Live event | Memphis, Tennessee | 1 | 13 | | |
| 141 | The Mighty Yankees (Frank Morrell (5) and Eddie Sullivan (4)) | February 15, 1969 | Live event | | 4 | 12 | | |
| 142 | Bill and Joe Sky | February 27, 1969 | Live event | Lexington, Kentucky | 1 | 2 | | |
| 143 | The Mighty Yankees (Frank Morrell (6) and Eddie Sullivan (5)) | March 1969 | Live event | | 5 | (Note: The date the championship was either won or lost has not been documented which means the championship reign lasted anywhere between 1 and 12 days) | | |
| 144 | Ken Lucas(5) and Johnny Walker (2) | March 13, 1969 | Live event | Chattanooga, Tennessee | 2 | (Note: The date the championship was either won or lost has not been documented which means the championship reign lasted anywhere between 1 day and 17 days) | | |
Championship history is unrecorded from March 13, 1969 to March 30, 1969.
| 145 | Johnny Walker (3) and Bob Ramstead | March 30, 1969 | Live event | | 1 | 1 | | |
| 146 | Tojo Yamamoto (12) and Johnny Long | March 31, 1969 | Live event | Chattanooga, Tennessee | 1 | 24 | | |
| 147 | Bill and Joe Sky | April 24, 1969 | Live event | | 2 | (Note: The date the championship was either won or lost has not been documented which means the championship reign lasted anywhere between 1 and 3 days) | | |
| 148 | Tojo Yamamoto (13) and Johnny Long (2) | April 1969 | Live event | | 2 | (Note: The date the championship was either won or lost has not been documented which means the championship reign lasted anywhere between 1 and 3 days) | | |
| 149 | Bob Ramstead (2) and Johnny Walker (4) | April 28, 1969 | Live event | Memphis, Tennessee | 2 | 21 | Defeated Johnny Long and Tojo Yamamoto. | |
| 150 | Johnny Long (3) and Tojo Yamamoto (14) | May 19, 1969 | Live event | Memphis, Tennessee | 3 | 21 | | |
| 151 | The Sundown Kid and Johnny Walker (5) | June 9, 1969 | Live event | Memphis, Tennessee | 1 | 7 | In Chattanooga, Yamamoto and Long have lost to Walker and Bob Ramstead on June 7, 1969, and are again billed as champions as of July 19, 1969. | |
| 152 | Johnny Long (4) and Tojo Yamamoto (15) | June 16, 1969 | Live event | Memphis, Tennessee | 4 | 56 | | |
| 153 | Dennis Hall (4) and Johnny Walker (6) | August 11, 1969 | Live event | Memphis, Tennessee | 1 | 5 | | |
| 154 | Tojo Yamamoto (16) and Johnny Long (5) | August 16, 1969 | Live event | | 5 | 51 | | |
| 155 | The Heavenly Bodies (Al and Don Greene) | October 6, 1969 | Live event | Memphis, Tennessee | 1 | 14 | | |
| 156 | Jackie Fargo (17) and Dennis Hall (5) | October 20, 1969 | Live event | Memphis, Tennessee | 1 | 14 | | |
| 157 | The Heavenly Bodies (Al and Don Greene) | November 3, 1969 | Live event | Memphis, Tennessee | 2 | 7 | | |
| 158 | Bearcat Brown and Les Thatcher | November 10, 1969 | Live event | Memphis, Tennessee | 1 | 7 | | |
| 159 | The Heavenly Bodies (Al and Don Greene) | November 17, 1969 | Live event | Memphis, Tennessee | 3 | 28 | | |
| 160 | Dennis Hall (6) and Johnny Long (6) | December 15, 1969 | Live event | Memphis, Tennessee | 1 | 8 | | |
| 161 | The Heavenly Bodies (Al and Don Greene) | December 23, 1969 | Live event | Memphis, Tennessee | 4 | 27 | | |
| 162 | Dennis Hall (7) and Johnny Walker (7) | January 19, 1970 | Live event | Memphis, Tennessee | 2 | 77 | | |
| — | Vacated | 1970 | — | — | — | — | Match took place sometime between March 27 and 29, 1970 | |
| 163 | Al Greene (5) and Frank Martinez | March 30, 1970 | Live event | Memphis, Tennessee | 1 | 23 | Defeated Johnny Walker and the Japanese Mystery Man in a tournament final. | |
| 164 | Len Rossi (15) and Bearcat Brown (2) | April 22, 1970 | Live event | Nashville, Tennessee | 1 | 7 | Greene and Martinez continue to be billed as champions in Memphis, Tennessee. | |
| 165 | The Interns (Billy Garrett and Jim Starr) | April 29, 1970 | Live event | Nashville, Tennessee | 1 | 5 | | |
| 166 | Bearcat Brown (3) and Len Rossi (16) | May 4, 1970 | Live event | Memphis, Tennessee | 2 | 14 | | |
| 167 | Al Greene (6) and Frank Martinez (2) | May 18, 1970 | Live event | Memphis, Tennessee | 2 | (Note: The date the championship was either won or lost has not been documented which means the championship reign lasted anywhere between 1 and 11 days) | | |
| 168 | Johnny Walker (8) and Len Rossi (17) | May 1970 | Live event | | 1 | (Note: The date the championship was either won or lost has not been documented which means the championship reign lasted anywhere between 1 and 11 days) | Are recognized as champions in Chattanooga, Tennessee. | |
| 169 | The Interns (Billy Garrett and Jim Starr) | May 30, 1970 | Live event | Memphis, Tennessee | 2 | 23 | | |
| 170 | Al Greene (7) and Frank Martinez (3) | June 22, 1970 | Live event | Memphis, Tennessee | 3 | 35 | | |
| 171 | The Interns (Billy Garrett and Jim Starr) | July 27, 1970 | Live event | Memphis, Tennessee | 3 | 28 | | |
| 172 | Johnny Walker (9) and Tojo Yamamoto (17) | August 24, 1970 | Live event | Memphis, Tennessee | 1 | 14 | | |
| 173 | The Interns (Billy Garrett and Jim Starr) | September 7, 1970 | Live event | Memphis, Tennessee | 4 | 12 | | |
| 174 | The Continental Warriors (Lorenzo Parente and Bobby Hart) | September 19, 1970 | Live event | | 1 | 30 | | |
| 175 | Jerry Jarrett and Tojo Yamamoto (18) | October 19, 1970 | Live event | Louisville, Kentucky | 1 | 61 | Guest referee was Eddie Marlin. | |
| 176 | The Heavenly Bodies (Al (8) and Don Greene (5)) | December 19, 1970 | Live event | | 5 | 21 | Sometime after November 2, 1970; again defeat Yamamoto and Jarrett in Memphis, Tennessee, on January 4, 1971. | |
| 177 | Jerry Jarrett and Tojo Yamamoto (19) | January 9, 1971 | Live event | Chattanooga, Tennessee | 2 | (Note: The date the championship was either won or lost has not been documented which means the championship reign lasted anywhere between 1 and 22 days) | | |
| 178 | Dennis Hall (8) and Johnny Walker (10) | January 1971 | Live event | | 1 | (Note: The date the championship was either won or lost has not been documented which means the championship reign lasted anywhere between 4 and 25 days) | | |
| 179 | The Heavenly Bodies (Al (9) and Don Greene (6)) | February 4, 1971 | Live event | | 6 | 21 | | |
| 180 | Len Rossi (18) and Bearcat Brown (4) | February 25, 1971 | Live event | | 2 | 40 | | |
| 181 | The Heavenly Bodies (Don Greene (7) and Al Greene (10)) | April 6, 1971 | Live event | | 7 | 13 | | |
| 182 | Len Rossi (19) and Bearcat Brown (5) | April 19, 1971 | Live event | | 3 | 28 | | |
| 183 | The Heavenly Bodies (Don Greene (8) and Al Greene (11)) | May 17, 1971 | Live event | | 8 | 14 | | |
| 184 | Jerry Jarrett and Tojo Yamamoto (20) | May 31, 1971 | Live event | Memphis, Tennessee | 3 | 21 | | |
| 185 | The Heavenly Bodies (Al (12) and Don Greene (9)) | June 21, 1971 | Live event | Memphis, Tennessee | 9 | 7 | Defeated Jarrett and Jackie Fargo, subbing for Yamamoto. | |
| 186 | Jerry Jarrett (4) and Jackie Fargo (18) | June 28, 1971 | Mid-South Coliseum | Memphis, Tennessee | 1 | 16 | | |
| 187 | The Von Brauners (Karl and Kurt Von Brauner) | July 14, 1971 | Live event | | 1 | 34 | | |
| 188 | The Heavenly Bodies (Al (13) and Don Greene (10)) | August 17, 1971 | Live event | | 10 | 8 | | |
| — | Vacated | August 24, 1971 | — | — | — | — | Championship vacated due to Don Greene's arm injury. | |
| 189 | Al Greene (14) and Sir Clements | August 25, 1971 | Live event | Nashville, Tennessee | 1 | 7 | Defeat Tojo Yamamoto and Jerry Jarrett. | |
| 190 | Tojo Yamamoto (21) and Jerry Jarrett | September 1, 1971 | Live event | Nashville, Tennessee | 4 | 14 | | |
| 191 | The Heavenly Bodies (Al Greene (15) and Don Greene (11)) | September 15, 1971 | Live event | | 11 | 10 | | |
| 192 | Tojo Yamamoto (22) and Robert Fuller | September 25, 1971 | Live event | Chattanooga, Tennessee | 1 | (Note: The date the championship was either won or lost has not been documented which means the championship reign lasted anywhere between 6 and 11 days) | | |
| 193 | The Heavenly Bodies (Al Greene (16) and Don Greene (12)) | October 1971 | Live event | | 12 | (Note: The date the championship was either won or lost has not been documented which means the championship reign lasted anywhere between 1 and 5 days) | | |
| 194 | Tojo Yamamoto (23) and Robert Fuller | October 6, 1971 | Live event | Nashville, Tennessee | 2 | 5 | | |
| 195 | Norvell Austin and Sputnik Monroe | October 11, 1971 | Mid-South Coliseum | Memphis, Tennessee | 1 | 14 | | |
| — | Vacated | October 1971 | — | — | — | — | Championship vacated for undocumented reasons. | |
| 196 | Norvell Austin and Sputnik Monroe | October 25, 1971 | Mid-South Coliseum | Memphis, Tennessee | 2 | 14 | Defeated Len Rossi and Bearcat Brown in one-night 8-team tournament final. | |
| 197 | Robert Fuller and Bearcat Brown (6) | November 8, 1971 | Mid-South Coliseum | Memphis, Tennessee | 1 | 21 | | |
| 198 | Uncle Elmer and Dennis Hall (9) | November 29, 1971 | Live event | | 1 | (Note: The date the championship was either won or lost has not been documented which means the championship reign lasted anywhere between 1 and 32 days) | | |
| 199 | The Interns (Billy Garrett and Jim Starr) | 1971 | Live event | | 5 | (Note: The date the championship was either won or lost has not been documented which means the championship reign lasted anywhere between 1 and 31 days) | | |
| 200 | Bearcat Brown (7) and Len Rossi (20) | 1971 | Live event | | 1 | (Note: The date the championship was either won or lost has not been documented which means the championship reign lasted anywhere between 87 and 118 days) | | |
| 201 | The Von Brauners (Kurt Von Brauner and Karl Von Brauner) | March 27, 1972 | Mid-South Coliseum | | 2 | (Note: The date the championship was either won or lost has not been documented which means the championship reign lasted anywhere between 5 and 13 days) | | |
| 202 | Jackie Fargo (19) and Jerry Jarrett (6) | April 1972 | Live event | | 2 | (Note: The date the championship was either won or lost has not been documented which means the championship reign lasted anywhere between 1 and 9 days) | | |
| 203 | The Interns (Billy Garrett and Jim Starr) | April 10, 1972 | Mid-South Coliseum | Memphis, Tennessee | 6 | 7 | | |
| 204 | Jackie Fargo (20) and Jerry Jarrett (7) | April 17, 1972 | Live event | Memphis, Tennessee | 3 | (Note: The date the championship was either won or lost has not been documented which means the championship reign lasted anywhere between 14 and 20 days) | Was a hair vs. championship match | |
| 205 | Norvell Austin and Sputnik Monroe | May 1972 | Live event | Memphis, Tennessee | 3 | (Note: The date the championship was either won or lost has not been documented which means the championship reign lasted anywhere between 1 and 7 days) | | |
| 206 | The Interns (Billy Garrett and Jim Starr) | May 8, 1972 | Live event | Memphis, Tennessee | 7 | 40 | Held up in June 14, 1972, at least in Nashville, Tennessee. | |
| 207 | Jackie Fargo (21) and Roughhouse Sonny Fargo | June 17, 1972 | Live event | Chattanooga, Tennessee | 1 | 2 | | |
| 208 | The Von Brauners (Karl and Kurt Von Brauner) | June 19, 1972 | Mid-South Coliseum | Memphis, Tennessee | 3 | 2 | | |
| 209 | The Interns (Billy Garrett and Jim Starr) | June 21, 1972 | Live event | Nashville, Tennessee | 8 | 3 | | |
| 210 | Jackie Fargo (22) and Roughhouse Fargo (2) | June 24, 1972 | Live event | Chattanooga, Tennessee | 2 | 59 | | |
| 211 | Bill Dromo and Tojo Yamamoto (24) | August 22, 1972 | Live event | | 1 | 62 | | |
| 212 | The Interns (Billy Garrett and Jim Starr) | October 23, 1972 | Live event | | 9 | 14 | | |
| 213 | Len Rossi (21) and Kevin Sullivan | November 6, 1972 | Mid-South Coliseum | Memphis, Tennessee | 1 | 7 | | |
| 214 | The Bounty Hunters (David Novak and Jerry Novak) | November 13, 1972 | Live event | | 1 | 33 | | |
| 215 | Johnny Walker (11) and Bearcat Brown (8) | December 16, 1972 | Mid-South Coliseum | Chattanooga, Tennessee | 1 | 14 | Bounty Hunters continue to defend in other towns and lose to Jackie Fargo and Jerry Jarrett on December 25, 1972, in Memphis, Tennessee. | |
| 216 | The New Bounty Hunters (Tom Andrews and Jim Starr (10)) | December 30, 1972 | Live event | Chattanooga, Tennessee | 1 | 16 | Again billed as champions in Memphis, Tennessee, in January 1973. | |
| 217 | Jerry Jarrett (8) and Jackie Fargo (23) | January 15, 1973 | Live event | Memphis, Tennessee | 4 | (Note: The date the championship was either won or lost has not been documented which means the championship reign lasted anywhere between 1 day and 28 days) | Continue to be billed as champions in Memphis through February 1973. | |
Championship history is unrecorded from January 15, 1973 to February 1973.
| 219 | Tojo Yamamoto (25) and Jerry Jarrett (9) | February 1973 | Live event | | 5 | (Note: The date the championship was either won or lost has not been documented which means the championship reign lasted anywhere between 1 and 12 days) | | |
| 220 | The Bounty Hunters (David Novak and Jerry Novak) | February 13, 1973 | Live event | Chattanooga, Tennessee | 3 | 7 | | |
| 221 | Jackie Fargo (24) and Jerry Jarrett (10) | February 20, 1973 | Live event | Chattanooga, Tennessee | 5 | 13 | | |
| 222 | Jerry Lawler and Jim White | March 5, 1973 | Live event | Nashville, Tennessee | 1 | 14 | | |
| 223 | Jackie Fargo (25) and Jerry Jarrett (11) | March 19, 1973 | Live event | Memphis, Tennessee | 6 | 7 | | |
| 224 | Jerry Lawler and Jim White | March 26, 1973 | Live event | Memphis, Tennessee | 2 | 14 | May be repeated on March 28, 1973, in Nashville, Tennessee. | |
| 225 | Tojo Yamamoto (26) and Roughhouse Fargo (3) | April 9, 1973 | Live event | Memphis, Tennessee | 1 | 7 | | |
| 226 | Jerry Lawler and Jim White | April 16, 1973 | Live event | | 3 | 2 | | |
| 227 | Jackie Fargo (26) and Jerry Jarrett (12) | April 18, 1973 | Live event | Nashville, Tennessee | 7 | 21 | | |
| 228 | Jerry Lawler and Jim White | May 9, 1973 | Live event | Nashville, Tennessee | 4 | 40 | | |
| — | Vacated | May 1973 | — | May 1973 | — | — | Vacated after White's nose was broken during a match. | |
| 229 | Jerry Lawler and Jim White | June 18, 1973 | Live event | Memphis, Tennessee | 5 | 12 | Defeated Jerry Jarrett and Tojo Yamamoto in a tournament final. | |
| 230 | Jerry Jarrett (13) and Johnny Marlin | June 30, 1973 | Live event | Chattanooga, Tennessee | 1 | 7 | | |
| 231 | Jerry Lawler and Jim White | July 7, 1973 | Live event | Chattanooga, Tennessee | 6 | 2 | | |
| 232 | Jackie Fargo (27) and Roughhouse Fargo (4) | July 9, 1973 | Live event | Memphis, Tennessee | 3 | 28 | Lawler and White defend in Chattanooga on July 14, 1973; Jarrett and Fargo defend in Memphis on July 15, 1973. | |
| 233 | Tommy Gilbert and Eddie Marlin | August 6, 1973 | Live event | Birmingham, Alabama | 1 | 1 | Defeat Lawler and Scorpio. | |
| 234 | Jerry Lawler and Jim White | August 7, 1973 | Live event | Memphis, Tennessee | 7 | 6 | | |
| 235 | Tommy Gilbert and Eddie Marlin | August 13, 1973 | Live event | Birmingham, Alabama | 2 | 2 | | |
| 236 | Jerry Lawler and Jim White | August 15, 1973 | Live event | Nashville, Tennessee | 8 | 7 | Continue to defend in Memphis, Tennessee. | |
| 237 | The Mighty Yankees (Mighty Yankee 1 and Mighty Yankee 3) | August 22, 1973 | Live event | Nashville, Tennessee | 5 | 7 | | |
| 238 | Tommy Gilbert and Eddie Marlin | August 29, 1973 | Live event | | 3 | 8 | | |
| — | Vacated | September 1973 | — | — | — | — | Championship vacated for undocumented reasons. | |
| 239 | Jerry Lawler (9) and Scorpion | September 6, 1973 | Live event | Florence, Alabama | 1 | 9 | Defeated Tommy Gilbert and Eddie Marlin but continue to defend in Chattanooga. | |
| 240 | The Mighty Yankees (Frank Morrell and Eddie Sullivan) | September 15, 1973 | Live event | Chattanooga, Tennessee | 6 | 1 | | |
| 241 | Tommy Gilbert and Eddie Marlin | September 17, 1973 | Live event | Chattanooga, Tennessee | 4 | 22 | | |
| 242 | Ron Garvin and Terry Garvin | October 9, 1973 | Live event | Memphis, Tennessee | 1 | 7 | | |
| 243 | Tommy Gilbert and Eddie Marlin | October 16, 1973 | Live event | Memphis, Tennessee | 5 | 13 | | |
| 244 | Jerry Lawler (10) and Al Greene (17) | October 29, 1973 | Live event | | 1 | 28 | | |
| 245 | Tojo Yamamoto (27) and Jerry Jarrett (14) | November 26, 1973 | Live event | Memphis, Tennessee | 6 | 56 | | |
| 246 | The Infernos (Ron Gibson and Stan Pulaski) | January 21, 1974 | Live event | Memphis, Tennessee | 1 | 49 | | |
| 247 | Rufus R. Jones and Roughhouse Fargo (5) | March 11, 1974 | Live event | Memphis, Tennessee | 1 | 35 | Frank Morrell and Charles Morrell are billed as champions in Chattanooga, Tennessee, on March 16, 1974. | |
| 248 | Bobo Brazil and Bearcat Brown (9) | April 15, 1974 | Live event | Memphis, Tennessee | 1 | 21 | Tojo Yamamoto and Mr. Kamikaze defeat Frank Morrell and Charles Morrell on April 17, 1974, for the recognitions in Nashville and possibly Chattanooga; Monte and DeCarlo defeat Yamamoto and Kamikaze on April 24, 1974, in Nashville, Tennessee, to regain. | |
| 249 | The Infernos (Ron Gibson and Stan Pulaski) | May 6, 1974 | Live event | Memphis, Tennessee | 3 | 7 | | |
| 250 | Bobo Brazil and Bearcat Brown (10) | May 13, 1974 | Live event | Memphis, Tennessee | 2 | 42 | | |
| 251 | Charlie Fulton and Bobby Mayne | June 24, 1974 | Live event | Memphis, Tennessee | 1 | 21 | Have already defended in Chattanooga on June 20, 1974. | |
| 252 | Ricky Gibson and Tommy Gilbert | July 15, 1974 | Live event | Memphis, Tennessee | 1 | 35 | Mayne and Fulton continue to be billed as champions in Chattanooga but lost to Rufus R. Jones and George Gulas on July 27, 1974; Jones and Gulas are again billed as champions in Chattanooga on August 17, 1974; in Nashville, Tennessee, Bounty Hunters defeat Frank Monte and Steve Kovac on July 17, 1974, to win the local recognition. | |
| 253 | Al Greene (18) and Phil Hickerson | August 19, 1974 | Live event | Memphis, Tennessee | 1 | 49 | | |
| 254 | Jerry Jarrett (15) and Tojo Yamamoto (28) | October 7, 1974 | Live event | Memphis, Tennessee | 7 | 14 | | |
| 255 | Al Greene (19) and Phil Hickerson (2) | October 21, 1974 | Live event | Memphis, Tennessee | 2 | 21 | | |
| 256 | Jerry Lawler (11) and Tojo Yamamoto (29) | November 11, 1974 | Live event | Memphis, Tennessee | 1 | 30 | Duke Myers and Blue Scorpion are billed as champions in Nashville, Tennessee, as of November 13, 1974. | |
| 257 | Al Greene (20) and Phil Hickerson (3) | December 11, 1974 | Live event | | 3 | 12 | Recognized in Nashville, Tennessee. | |
| 258 | Jerry Lawler (12) and Tojo Yamamoto (30) | December 23, 1974 | Live event | | 2 | (Note: The date the championship was either won or lost has not been documented which means the championship reign lasted anywhere between 1 day and 15 days) | | |
Championship history is unrecorded from December 23, 1974 to January 7, 1975.
| 259 | Eddie Marlin (6) and Tojo Yamamoto (31) | January 7, 1975 | Live event | Louisville, Kentucky | 1 | 62 | | |
| 260 | George Barnes and Bill Dundee | March 10, 1975 | Live event | Memphis, Tennessee | 1 | (Note: The date the championship was either won or lost has not been documented which means the championship reign lasted anywhere between 1 and 20 days) | | |
| 261 | Tojo Yamamoto (32) and Jimmy Golden | March 1975 | Live event | | 1 | (Note: The date the championship was either won or lost has not been documented which means the championship reign lasted anywhere between 1 and 20 days) | Sometime between March 25, 1975, and March 30, 1975. | |
| 262 | Bill Dundee (2) and George Barnes (2) | March 31, 1975 | Live event | | 2 | (Note: The date the championship was either won or lost has not been documented which means the championship reign lasted anywhere between 31 and 61 days) | | |
| 263 | Jimmy Golden and Tojo Yamamoto (33) | May 1975 | Live event | | 2 | (Note: The date the championship was either won or lost has not been documented which means the championship reign lasted anywhere between 16 and 46 days) | Sometime between May 15, 1975, and May 24, 1975. | |
| 264 | Otto Von Heller and Karl Von Steiger | June 16, 1975 | Live event | Memphis, Tennessee | 1 | 7 | | |
| 265 | Jackie Fargo (28) and Mr. Wrestling (13) | June 23, 1975 | Live event | Memphis, Tennessee | 1 | 22 | Mr. Wrestling was Don Greene under a mask | |
| 266 | Otto Von Heller and Karl Von Steiger | July 15, 1975 | Live event | | 2 | 12 | | |
| 267 | Jackie Fargo (29) and Don Greene (14) | July 27, 1975 | Live event | | 2 | 44 | | |
| 268 | The Interns (Tom Andrews and Jim Starr) | September 9, 1975 | Live event | Memphis, Tennessee | 10 | 31 | | |
| 269 | Charlie Cook and Tommy Seigler | October 10, 1975 | Live event | Nashville, Tennessee | 1 | 72 | | |
| 270 | Bearcat Brown (12) and Tommy Gilbert | December 21, 1975 | Live event | Memphis, Tennessee | 1 | 14 | Interns continue to be billed as champions in Chattanooga but lose to Lester Welch and Jackie Fargo on December 27, 1975. | |
| 271 | The Interns (Tom Andrews and Jim Starr) | January 4, 1976 | Live event | Memphis, Tennessee | 11 | 8 | | |
| 272 | Tommy Gilbert (2) and Bearcat Brown (13) | January 12, 1976 | Live event | Memphis, Tennessee | 2 | (Note: The date the championship was either won or lost has not been documented which means the championship reign lasted anywhere between 20 and 47 days) | | |
| 273 | The Bounty Hunters (David and Jerry Novak) | February 1976 | Live event | | 4 | (Note: The date the championship was either won or lost has not been documented which means the championship reign lasted anywhere between 1 and 27 days) | | |
| 274 | Bearcat Brown (14) and Tommy Gilbert (3) | February 1976 | Live event | | 2 | (Note: The date the championship was either won or lost has not been documented which means the championship reign lasted anywhere between 8 and 34 days) | | |
| 275 | Roger Kirby and David Schultz | March 7, 1976 | Live event | Memphis, Tennessee | 1 | 15 | | |
| 276 | Big Bad John and Bill Dundee (3) | March 22, 1976 | Live event | Memphis, Tennessee | 1 | 35 | | || ref=[27] |
| 277 | Jerry Lawler (13) and Playboy Frazier | April 26, 1976 | Live event | | 1 | 7 | Sometime after April 13, 1976. | |
| 278 | Big Bad John and Bill Dundee (4) | May 3, 1976 | Live event | Memphis, Tennessee | 2 | 7 | | |
| 279 | Don Greene (15) and Scorpion | May 10, 1976 | Live event | Memphis, Tennessee | 1 | 35 | | |
| 280 | Jackie Fargo (30) and Jerry Jarrett (16) | June 14, 1976 | Live event | Memphis, Tennessee | 8 | 35 | Don Greene and Scorpion (Don Bass) are advertised as champions in Louisville, Kentucky, on June 15, 1976. | |
| 281 | The Bicentennial Kings (Dennis Condrey and Phil Hickerson (4)) | July 19, 1976 | Live event | Memphis, Tennessee | 1 | (Note: The date the championship was either won or lost has not been documented which means the championship reign lasted anywhere between 1 and 12 days) | | |
| 282 | Bill Dundee (5) and Tommy Rich | July 1976 | Live event | | 1 | (Note: The date the championship was either won or lost has not been documented which means the championship reign lasted anywhere between 1 and 12 days) | | |
| 283 | The Bicentennial Kings (Dennis Condrey (2) and Phil Hickerson (5)) | July 1976 | Live event | | 2 | (Note: The date the championship was either won or lost has not been documented which means the championship reign lasted anywhere between 45 and 56 days) | | |
| 284 | Tojo Yamamoto (34) and Bill Dundee (6) | September 14, 1976 | Live event | Memphis, Tennessee | 1 | 20 | Condrey and Hickerson are advertised as champions in Louisville, Kentucky, on September 16, 1976. | |
| 285 | The Bicentennial Kings (Dennis Condrey (3) and Phil Hickerson (6)) | October 4, 1976 | Live event | Memphis, Tennessee | 3 | 28 | | |
| 286 | Danny Little Bear and Chief Thundercloud | November 1, 1976 | Live event | Memphis, Tennessee | 1 | 63 | | |
| 287 | Dutch Mantel and David Schultz (2) | January 3, 1977 | Live event | | 1 | 21 | | |
| 288 | Bill Dundee (7) and Ricky Gibson (2) | January 24, 1977 | Live event | Memphis, Tennessee | 1 | 14 | | |
| 289 | Gorgeous George Jr. and Porkchop Cash | February 7, 1977 | Live event | Memphis, Tennessee | 1 | 35 | | |
| — | Vacated | March 1977 | — | — | — | — | | |
| 290 | The Bicentennial Kings (Dennis Condrey (4) and Phil Hickerson (7)) | March 14, 1977 | Live event | Memphis, Tennessee | 4 | 48 | Defeat Ricky Gibson and Robert Gibson in one-night 8-team tournament final; title moves to Jerry Jarrett's group on March 20, 1977. | |
| 291 | Ricky Gibson (3) and Robert Gibson | May 1, 1977 | Live event | Memphis, Tennessee | 1 | 22 | | |
| 292 | The Bicentennial Kings (Dennis Condrey (5) and Phil Hickerson (8)) | May 23, 1977 | Live event | Memphis, Tennessee | 5 | 27 | | |
| 293 | Tommy Gilbert and Tommy Rich | June 19, 1977 | Live event | Memphis, Tennessee | 1 | 8 | | |
| 294 | The Bicentennial Kings (Dennis Condrey (6) and Phil Hickerson (9)) | June 27, 1977 | Live event | Memphis, Tennessee | 6 | 7 | | |
| 295 | Bob Ellis and Jim Garvin | July 4, 1977 | Live event | Memphis, Tennessee | 1 | 21 | | |
| 296 | The Hollywood Blonds (Jerry Brown and Buddy Roberts) | July 25, 1977 | Live event | Memphis, Tennessee | 1 | 21 | | |
| 297 | Norvell Austin and Pat Barrett | August 15, 1977 | Live event | Memphis, Tennessee | 1 | 7 | | |
| 298 | The Hollywood Blonds (Jerry Brown and Buddy Roberts) | August 22, 1977 | Live event | Memphis, Tennessee | 2 | 14 | Held up after a match against the Exterminators on August 29, 1977, in Memphis, Tennessee, ends as a draw; Austin and Barrett are still billed as champions in Louisville, Kentucky, against the Blonds on August 30, 1977. | |
| 299 | The Hollywood Blonds (Jerry Brown and Buddy Roberts) | September 5, 1977 | Live event | Memphis, Tennessee | 3 | 14 | Defeat Jim Garvin and Jim Bryant. | |
| 300 | Norvell Austin and Pat Barrett | September 19, 1977 | Live event | Memphis, Tennessee | 2 | 11 | | |
| 301 | The Samoans (Afa and Sika) | September 30, 1977 | Live event | | 1 | 45 | Held up after a match against Big Red and Robert Gibson on November 7, 1977, in Memphis, Tennessee, ends as a no-contest. | |
| 302 | The Samoans (Afa and Sika) | November 14, 1977 | Live event | Memphis, Tennessee | 2 | 14 | Defeat Red and Gibson in rematch. | |
| 303 | The Bicentennial Kings (Dennis Condrey (7) and Phil Hickerson (10)) | November 28, 1977 | Live event | Memphis, Tennessee | 7 | 42 | | |
| 304 | Norvell Austin (3) and Bill Dundee (8) | January 9, 1978 | Live event | Memphis, Tennessee | 1 | (Note: The date the championship was either won or lost has not been documented which means the championship reign lasted anywhere between 23 and 40 days) | | |
| — | Vacated | February 1978 | — | — | — | — | Vacated when the team splits up. | |
| 305 | The Bicentennial Kings (Dennis Condrey (8) and Phil Hickerson (11)) | February 1978 | Live event | | 8 | (Note: The date the championship was either won or lost has not been documented which means the championship reign lasted anywhere between 1 and 17 days) | | |
| 306 | Frazier and Terry Sawyer | February 19, 1978 | Live event | Memphis, Tennessee | 1 | 22 | | |
| 307 | Bill Dundee (9) and Jerry Lawler (14) | March 13, 1978 | Live event | | 1 | 49 | | |
| 308 | Jos LeDuc and Jean Louie | May 1, 1978 | Live event | | 1 | 28 | | |
| — | Vacated | May 22, 1978 | — | — | — | — | Vacated after a match against Jerry Lawler and Jimmy Valiant on May 22, 1978, ends as a no-contest. | |
| 309 | Jerry Lawler (15) and Jimmy Valiant | May 29, 1978 | Live event | Memphis, Tennessee | 1 | 56 | Defeat LeDuc and Louie in rematch. | |
| 310 | Jos LeDuc and Jean Louie | July 24, 1978 | Live event | | 2 | 56 | Title renamed AWA Southern Tag Team Championship upon partnership with the American Wrestling Association and was billed as such starting in July 1978. | |
| | | N/A | N/A | N/A | | | | |
AWA Southern Tag Team Championship
| 312 | Jerry Lawler (16) and Mongolian Stomper | September 18, 1978 | Live event | Memphis, Tennessee | 1 | 21 | | |
| — | Vacated | 1978 | — | — | — | — | Championship vacated after the Stomper turns on Lawler. | |
| 313 | The Bounty Hunters (David and Jerry Novak) | October 9, 1978 | Live event | Memphis, Tennessee | 5 | 28 | Defeated Bill Dundee and Jimmy Valiant in tournament final. | |
| 314 | Bill Dundee (10) and Jerry Lawler (17) | November 6, 1978 | Live event | Memphis, Tennessee | 2 | 42 | | |
| 315 | Dennis Condrey (9) and Phil Hickerson (12) | December 18, 1978 | Live event | Memphis, Tennessee | 9 | 35 | | |
| — | Vacated | January 1979 | — | — | — | — | Championship vacated for undocumented reasons. | |
| 316 | Robert Fuller and Toru Tanaka | January 21, 1979 | Live event | Memphis, Tennessee | | 28 | Fuller defeated Don Carson and Dennis Condrey in a tournament final. Tanaka left the ring during the match. | |
| 317 | Don Carson (3) and Dennis Condrey (10) | February 18, 1979 | Live event | | | 8 | Won the title by forfeit after Fuller and Tanaka split up as a team. | |
| 318 | Bill Dundee (11) and Robert Fuller | February 26, 1979 | Live event | Memphis, Tennessee | 1 | 56 | | |
| 319 | The Assassins (Assassin #1 and Assassin #2) | April 23, 1979 | Live event | Memphis, Tennessee | 1 | 14 | | |
| 320 | Bill Dundee (12) and Robert Fuller (2) | May 7, 1979 | Live event | Memphis, Tennessee | 2 | 7 | | |
| 321 | Mr. Fuji and Toru Tanaka | May 14, 1979 | Live event | Memphis, Tennessee | 1 | 21 | | |
| 322 | Bill Dundee (13) and Jerry Lawler (18) | June 4, 1979 | Live event | Memphis, Tennessee | 3 | 11 | | |
| 323 | The Blond Bombers (Wayne Farris and Larry Latham) | June 15, 1979 | N/A | Tupelo, MississippiLive event | 1 | (Note: The date the championship was either won or lost has not been documented which means the championship reign lasted anywhere between 78 and 100 days) | | |
| 324 | The Fabulous Freebirds (Terry Gordy and Michael Hayes) | September 1979 | Live event | | 1 | (Note: The date the championship was either won or lost has not been documented which means the championship reign lasted anywhere between 1 and 23 days) | | |
| 325 | Sonny King and Ricky Morton | September 24, 1979 | Live event | Memphis, Tennessee | 1 | 7 | | |
| 326 | The Blond Bombers (Wayne Farris and Larry Latham) | October 1, 1979 | Live event | Memphis, Tennessee | 2 | 49 | | |
| — | Vacated | October 22, 1979 | — | Memphis, Tennessee | — | — | Vacated after a match against ends as a no-contest. | |
| 327 | Hector Guerrero and Steve Regal | November 19, 1979 | Live event | Memphis, Tennessee | 1 | 13 | | |
| 328 | The Assassins (Assassin #1 and Assassin #2) | December 2, 1979 | Live event | Memphis, Tennessee | 2 | 30 | | |
| 329 | Ricky (4) and Robert Gibson (2) | January 1, 1980 | Live event | Memphis, Tennessee | 2 | 6 | | |
| 330 | The Assassins (Assassin #1 and Assassin #2) | January 7, 1980 | Live event | Memphis, Tennessee | 3 | 21 | Held up after a match against Ken Lucas and Steve Regal on January 21, 1980, in Memphis, Tennessee. | |
| 331 | The Assassins (Assassin #1 and Assassin #2) | January 28, 1980 | Live event | Memphis, Tennessee | 4 | 21 | Win rematch. | |
| 332 | Ken Lucasand Billy Robinson | February 18, 1980 | Live event | Memphis, Tennessee | 1 | 7 | | |
| 333 | The Assassins (Assassin #1 and Assassin #2) | February 25, 1980 | Live event | Memphis, Tennessee | 5 | 10 | | |
| 334 | Ken Lucas and Billy Robinson | March 6, 1980 | Live event | Lexington, Kentucky | 2 | 5 | | |
| 335 | Paul Ellering and Sheik Ali Hassan | March 11, 1980 | Live event | Louisville, Kentucky | 1 | (Note: The date the championship was either won or lost has not been documented which means the championship reign lasted anywhere between 21 and 26 days) | | |
| 336 | Ken Lucas and Billy Robinson | April 1980 | Live event | | 3 | (Note: The date the championship was either won or lost has not been documented which means the championship reign lasted anywhere between 1 and 6 days) | | |
| 337 | Dennis Condrey (11) and David Schultz (3) | April 7, 1980 | Live event | Memphis, Tennessee | 1 | 35 | | |
| 338 | Rocky Johnson and Jimmy Valiant | May 12, 1980 | Live event | Memphis, Tennessee | 1 | 13 | Condrey and Schultz are still billed as champions in Chattanooga, Tennessee, on May 17, 1980. | |
| 339 | Gypsy Joe Dorsetti and Skull Murphy | May 25, 1980 | Live event | Memphis, Tennessee | 1 | 8 | | |
| 340 | Ken Lucas and Ricky Morton | June 2, 1980 | Live event | Memphis, Tennessee | 1 | 9 | | |
| 341 | Jackie Fargo (31) and Randy Fargo | June 11, 1980 | Live event | Nashville, Tennessee | 1 | (Note: The date the championship was either won or lost has not been documented which means the championship reign lasted anywhere between 20 and 21 days) | | |
| — | Vacated | June 18, 1980 | — | — | — | — | Vacated after Jackie Fargo retired. | |
| 342 | Gypsy Joe Dorsetti and Skull Murphy | July 1980 | Live event | Wheeling, West Virginia | 2 | (Note: The date the championship was either won or lost has not been documented which means the championship reign lasted anywhere between 1 and 1 days) | Defeated Rocky Johnson and Jimmy Valiant. This title change may not have actually taken place. | |
| 343 | Ken Lucasand Ricky Morton (2) | July 2, 1980 | Live event | Memphis, Tennessee | 1 | 26 | Are billed as champions in Memphis as of July 9, 1980. | |
| 344 | Killer Karl Krupp and El Mongol | July 28, 1980 | Live event | Memphis, Tennessee | 1 | 28 | Defeated Lucas and Paul Ellering, subbing for Morton. | |
| 345 | Eddie Gilbert and Tommy Gilbert | August 25, 1980 | Live event | Louisville, Kentucky | 1 | 21 | | |
| 346 | The Angel and Sonny King | September 15, 1980 | Live event | Memphis, Tennessee | 1 | 14 | | |
| 347 | Eddie Gilbert and Tommy Gilbert | September 29, 1980 | Live event | Memphis, Tennessee | 2 | 28 | | |
| 348 | Bill Irwin and Larry Latham (3) | October 27, 1980 | Live event | Memphis, Tennessee | 1 | 7 | | |
| 349 | Ken Lucasand Ricky Morton (3) | November 3, 1980 | Live event | Memphis, Tennessee | 2 | 1 | Held up after a match against Bill Irwin and Scott Irwin on November 10, 1980, in Memphis, Tennessee. | |
| 350 | Roger Kirby (2) and Guy Mitchell | November 4, 1980 | Live event | Memphis, Tennessee | 1 | 13 | | |
| 351 | Ken Lucasand Ricky Morton (4) | November 17, 1980 | Live event | Memphis, Tennessee | 3 | 35 | Defeat the Irwins in rematch. | |
| 352 | Bill Dundee (14) and Tommy Rich | December 22, 1980 | Live event | Memphis, Tennessee | 2 | 42 | | |
| 353 | The Bounty Hunters (David and Jerry Novak) | February 2, 1981 | Live event | Memphis, Tennessee | 6 | 13 | | |
| 354 | Bill Dundee (15) and Tommy Rich | February 15, 1981 | Live event | Memphis, Tennessee | 3 | 27 | | |
| 355 | Wayne Farris(3) and Tojo Yamamoto (35) | March 14, 1981 | Live event | Memphis, Tennessee | 1 | 2 | Farris and Yamamoto defeated Dundee in a handicap match. Rich was unable to wrestle due to an injury. | |
| 356 | Bill Dundee (16) and Dream Machine | March 16, 1981 | Live event | Memphis, Tennessee | 1 | 14 | | |
| 357 | Masa Fuchi and Mr. Onita | March 30, 1981 | Live event | Memphis, Tennessee | 1 | 7 | | |
| 358 | Bill Dundee (17) and Dream Machine | April 6, 1981 | Live event | Memphis, Tennessee | 2 | 26 | | |
| 359 | Kevin Sullivan and Wayne Ferris (4) | May 2, 1981 | Live event | Memphis, Tennessee | 1 | 16 | | |
| 360 | Bill Dundee and Dream Machine | May 18, 1981 | Live event | Memphis, Tennessee | 3 | 7 | | |
| 361 | Wayne Farris(5) and Kevin Sullivan (2) | May 25, 1981 | Live event | Memphis, Tennessee | 2 | 49 | | |
| 362 | Bill Dundee (18) and Jerry Lawler (19) | July 13, 1981 | Live event | Memphis, Tennessee | 4 | (Note: The date the championship was either won or lost has not been documented which means the championship reign lasted anywhere between 1 and 17 days) | | |
| 363 | Masa Fuchi and Mr. Onita | 1981 | Live event | Memphis, Tennessee | 2 | (Note: The date the championship was either won or lost has not been documented which means the championship reign lasted anywhere between 2 and 18 days) | | |
| 364 | Ricky (5) and Robert Gibson (3) | August 1, 1981 | Live event | Memphis, Tennessee | 3 | 2 | | |
| 365 | Masa Fuchi and Mr. Onita | August 3, 1981 | Live event | | 3 | 28 | | |
| 366 | Eddie Gilbert (2) and Ricky Morton (5) | August 31, 1981 | Live event | Memphis, Tennessee | 1 | 7 | | |
| 367 | The Heartbreakers (Joey Cagle and Rocky Sortor) | September 7, 1981 | Live event | Memphis, Tennessee | 1 | 7 | | |
| 368 | Ricky (6) and Robert Gibson (4) | September 14, 1981 | Live event | Memphis, Tennessee | 4 | 12 | Defeat Rick Gibson. | |
| 369 | Stan Lane and Sweet Brown Sugar | September 26, 1981 | Live event | Memphis, Tennessee | 1 | 51 | Defeated Ricky Gibson in a handicap match. | |
| 370 | Bill Dundee (19) and Steve Keirn | November 16, 1981 | Live event | Memphis, Tennessee | 1 | 103 | | |
| 371 | The Midnight Express (Norvell Austin (4), Dennis Condrey (12) and Randy Rose) | February 27, 1982 | Live event | Memphis, Tennessee | 1 | 9 | Austin defeated Keirn by disqualification. All three were recognized as champions. | |
| — | Vacated | March 6, 1982 | — | — | — | — | Championship stripped due to controversial of the Express' title win. | |
| 372 | Bobby Eaton and Sweet Brown Sugar (2) | March 8, 1982 | Live event | Louisville, Kentucky | 1 | 28 | Defeated Robert Gibson and Stan Lane in a tournament final repeated on March 14, 1982, in Louisville, Kentucky, held up on March 29, 1982, in Memphis, Tennessee, after a match against Ricky and Robert Gibson. | |
| 373 | Bobby Eaton and Sweet Brown Sugar (3) | April 5, 1982 | Live event | Memphis, Tennessee | 2 | 21 | Defeat Robert Gibson and Steve Keirn. | |
| 374 | Steve Keirn (2) and Bill Dundee (20) | April 26, 1982 | Live event | Memphis, Tennessee | 2 | 14 | | |
| 375 | The Midnight Express (Norvell Austin (5), Dennis Condrey (13) and Randy Rose) | May 10, 1982 | Live event | Memphis, Tennessee | 2 | 7 | | |
| 376 | Steve Keirn (3) and Bill Dundee (21) | May 17, 1982 | Live event | Memphis, Tennessee | 3 | 7 | | |
| 377 | The Midnight Express (Norvell Austin (6), Dennis Condrey (14) and Randy Rose) | May 24, 1982 | Live event | Memphis, Tennessee | 3 | 42 | | |
| 378 | Ron Bass and Stan Lane (2) | July 5, 1982 | Live event | Memphis, Tennessee | 1 | 7 | Defeated Norvell Austin and Dennis Condrey. | |
| 379 | The Midnight Express (Norvell Austin (6), Dennis Condrey (14) and Randy Rose) | July 12, 1982 | Live event | Memphis, Tennessee | 3 | 7 | | |
| 380 | Stan Lane (3) and Ron Bass | July 19, 1982 | Live event | Memphis, Tennessee | 2 | 21 | | |
| 381 | Dream Machine(3) and Jim Mitchell | August 9, 1982 | Live event | Memphis, Tennessee | 1 | 7 | | |
| 382 | Bobby Eaton and Sweet Brown Sugar (4) | August 16, 1982 | Live event | Memphis, Tennessee | 3 | 14 | | |
| 383 | Steve Keirn (4) and Terry Taylor | August 30, 1982 | Live event | Memphis, Tennessee | 1 | 7 | | |
| 384 | Bobby Eaton and Sweet Brown Sugar (5) | September 6, 1982 | Live event | Memphis, Tennessee | 4 | 49 | | |
| 385 | The Fabulous Ones (Steve Keirn (5) and Stan Lane (5)) | October 25, 1982 | Live event | Memphis, Tennessee | 1 | 28 | Defeated Bobby Eaton and Koko Ware. | |
| 386 | Bobby Eaton (5) and Duke Myers | November 22, 1982 | Live event | Memphis, Tennessee | 1 | 7 | | |
| 387 | The Fabulous Ones (Steve Keirn (6) and Stan Lane (6)) | November 29, 1982 | Live event | Memphis, Tennessee | 2 | 28 | | |
| 388 | The Sheepherders (Jonathan Boyd and Luke Williams) | December 27, 1982 | Live event | Memphis, Tennessee | 1 | 41 | | |
| 389 | The Fabulous Ones (Steve Keirn (7) and Stan Lane (7)) | February 6, 1983 | Live event | Memphis, Tennessee | 3 | 1 | Awarded the title when Williams misses a scheduled defense. | |
| 390 | The Sheepherders (Jonathan Boyd and Luke Williams) | February 7, 1983 | Live event | Louisville, Kentucky | 2 | 6 | | |
| 391 | The Fabulous Ones (Steve Keirn (8) and Stan Lane (8)) | February 13, 1983 | Live event | Memphis, Tennessee | 4 | 50 | | |
| 392 | The Moondogs (Rex and Spot) | April 4, 1983 | Live event | Memphis, Tennessee | 1 | 21 | | |
| 393 | The Fabulous Ones (Steve Keirn (9) and Stan Lane (9)) | April 25, 1983 | Live event | Memphis, Tennessee | 5 | 21 | | |
| 394 | Bobby Eaton (6) and Duke Myers | May 16, 1983 | Live event | Memphis, Tennessee | 2 | 29 | | |
| 395 | The Fabulous Ones (Steve Keirn (10) and Stan Lane (10)) | June 14, 1983 | Live event | Louisville, Kentucky | 6 | 55 | | |
| 396 | The Grapplers (Tony Anthony and Len Denton) | August 8, 1983 | Live event | Memphis, Tennessee | 1 | 42 | | |
| 397 | Dutch Mantel (2) and Koko Ware (6) | September 19, 1983 | Live event | Memphis, Tennessee | 1 | 14 | | |
| 398 | The Bruise Brothers (Dream Machine and Porkchop Cash) | October 3, 1983 | Live event | Memphis, Tennessee | 1 | 35 | | |
| 399 | The Rock 'n' Roll Express (Robert Gibson (5) and Ricky Morton (6)) | November 7, 1983 | Live event | Memphis, Tennessee | 1 | 7 | | |
| 400 | The Bruise Brothers (Dream Machine and Porkchop Cash) | November 14, 1983 | Live event | Memphis, Tennessee | 2 | 14 | | |
| 401 | The Fabulous Ones (Steve Keirn (11) and Stan Lane (11)) | November 28, 1983 | Live event | Memphis, Tennessee | 7 | 57 | | |
| — | Vacated | January 24, 1984 | — | — | — | — | The Zambuie Express won the title by forfeit, however this was disallowed. | |
| 402 | The Zambuie Express (Elijah Akeem and Kareem Muhammad) | January 1984 | Live event | | 1 | (Note: The date the championship was either won or lost has not been documented which means the championship reign lasted anywhere between 1 and 30 days) | | |
| 403 | The Zambuie Express (Elijah Akeem and Kareem Muhammad) | January 31, 1984 | Live event | Memphis, Tennessee | 2 | 6 | Defeated The Pretty Young Things in a tournament final. | |
| 404 | The Pretty Young Things (Norvell Austin (7) and Sweet Brown Sugar (7)) | February 6, 1984 | Live event | Memphis, Tennessee | 1 | 8 | | |
| 405 | The Zambuie Express (Elijah Akeem and Kareem Muhammad) | February 14, 1984 | Live event | Memphis, Tennessee | 2 | 27 | | |
| 406 | Jerry Lawler (20) and Jos LeDuc | March 12, 1984 | Live event | Memphis, Tennessee | 1 | 14 | | |
| — | Vacated | March 19, 1984 | — | — | — | — | Title vacated after the team split up following LeDuc and Jimmy Hart's abandonment of Lawler in a six-man tag team match against Kareem Muhammad, King Konga and J. J. Dillon on March 18, 1984, in Memphis, Tennessee. | |
| 407 | Eddie Gilbert and Tommy Rich (3) | March 26, 1984 | Live event | Memphis, Tennessee | 1 | 84 | Defeated The Pretty Young Things in a tournament final. | |
| 408 | Phil Hickerson (13) and The Spoiler | June 18, 1984 | Live event | Memphis, Tennessee | 1 | 28 | | |
| — | Vacated | July 9, 1984 | — | — | — | — | Title held up after a match against Dutch Mantel and Porkchop Cash. | |
| 409 | Phil Hickerson (14) and The Spoiler | July 16, 1984 | Live event | Memphis, Tennessee | 2 | 28 | Defeated Mantel and Cash in a rematch. | |
| 410 | The Rock 'n' Roll Express (Robert Gibson (6) and Ricky Morton (7)) | August 13, 1984 | Live event | Memphis, Tennessee | 2 | 7 | | |
| 411 | The Nightmares (Danny Davis and Ken Wayne) | August 20, 1984 | Live event | Memphis, Tennessee | 1 | 26 | | |
| 412 | Dutch Mantel (3) and Tommy Rich (4) | September 15, 1984 | Live event | Memphis, Tennessee | 1 | 23 | | |
| — | Vacated | October 1, 1984 | — | — | — | — | Title vacated when Mantel and Rich split up. | |
| 413 | King Kong Bundy and Rick Rude | October 8, 1984 | Live event | Memphis, Tennessee | | 14 | Defeated The Fabulous Ones in a tournament final. | |
| 414 | The Fabulous Ones (Stan Lane (12) and Steve Keirn (12)) | October 22, 1984 | Live event | Memphis, Tennessee | | 42 | | |
| 415 | The New Interns (Don Bass and Roger Smith) | December 3, 1984 | Live event | Memphis, Tennessee | | 42 | | |
| — | Vacated | January 7, 1985 | — | — | — | — | Championship vacated after a match against The Dirty White Boys (Tony Anthony and Len Denton) ends in a no-contest. | |
| 416 | The New Interns (Don Bass and Roger Smith) | January 14, 1985 | Live event | Memphis, Tennessee | 2 | 35 | Defeated The Rock 'n' Roll Express in a tournament final. | |
| 417 | The Fabulous Ones (Stan Lane (13) and Steve Keirn (13)) | February 18, 1985 | Live event | Memphis, Tennessee | 9 | 56 | | |
| 418 | The PYT Express (Norvell Austin (8) and Koko Ware (8)) | April 15, 1985 | Live event | Memphis, Tennessee | 2 | 28 | Koko B. Ware formerly known as Sugar Sweet Brown. | |
| 419 | The Fabulous Ones (Stan Lane (14) and Steve Keirn (14)) | May 13, 1985 | Live event | Memphis, Tennessee | 10 | (Note: The date the championship was either won or lost has not been documented which means the championship reign lasted anywhere between 1 and 18 days) | Defeat Austin and Billy Travis. | |
| 420 | The PYT Express (Norvell Austin (9) and Koko Ware (9)) | May 1985 | Live event | Memphis, Tennessee | 3 | (Note: The date the championship was either won or lost has not been documented which means the championship reign lasted anywhere between 17 and 34 days) | Belts returned because of use of substitute. | |
| — | Vacated | June 1985 | — | — | — | — | Championsho vacated after The PYT Express use a substitute in a match against The Fabulous Ones. | |
| 421 | The Fabulous Ones (Stan Lane (15) and Steve Keirn (15)) | June 17, 1985 | Live event | Memphis, Tennessee | 11 | 5 | Defeated Ron Sexton and Billy Travis in a tournament final. | |
| 422 | The Sheepherders (Jonathan Boyd (3) and Rip Morgan) | June 22, 1985 | Live event | Memphis, Tennessee | 1 | 75 | The Sheepherders were stripped of the titles after they won them, however the belts were given back upon threats of a lawsuit. | |
| 423 | The Fabulous Ones (Stan Lane (16) and Steve Keirn (16)) | September 5, 1985 | Live event | Lexington, Kentucky | 12 | 1 | | |
| 424 | The Sheepherders (Jonathan Boyd (4) and Rip Morgan) | September 6, 1985 | Live event | Blytheville, Arkansas | 2 | 3 | | |
| 425 | The Fabulous Ones (Stan Lane (17) and Steve Keirn (17)) | September 9, 1985 | Live event | Memphis, Tennessee | 13 | 7 | | |
| 426 | The Sheepherders (Jonathan Boyd (5) and Rip Morgan) | September 16, 1985 | Live event | Memphis, Tennessee | 3 | 1 | | |
| 427 | The Fabulous Ones (Stan Lane (18) and Steve Keirn (18)) | September 17, 1985 | Live event | Louisville, Kentucky | 14 | (Note: The date the championship was either won or lost has not been documented which means the championship reign lasted anywhere between 1 and 13 days) | | |
| 428 | The Sheepherders (Jonathan Boyd (6) and Rip Morgan) | September 1985 | Live event | | 4 | (Note: The date the championship was either won or lost has not been documented which means the championship reign lasted anywhere between 14 and 26 days) | | |
| 429 | The Fabulous Ones (Stan Lane (19) and Steve Keirn (19)) | October 14, 1985 | Live event | Memphis, Tennessee | 15 | 28 | | |
| 430 | Bill Dundee (22) and Dutch Mantel (4) | November 11, 1985 | Live event | Memphis, Tennessee | 1 | 28 | | |
| 431 | Austin Idol and Jerry Lawler (20) | December 9, 1985 | Live event | Memphis, Tennessee | 1 | 35 | | |
| — | Vacated | December 30, 1985 | — | — | — | — | Championship vacated when Lawler loses a "loser leaves town" match to Bill Dundee. | |
| 432 | The Fantastics (Bobby Fulton and Tommy Rogers) | January 13, 1986 | Live event | Memphis, Tennessee | 1 | 70 | Defeated The Sheepherders (Jonathan Boyd and Bigfoot) in a tournament final. | |
| 433 | The MOD Squad (Spike and Basher) | March 24, 1986 | Live event | Memphis, Tennessee | 1 | 91 | Won the title via forfeit. | |
| 434 | Giant Hillbilly Elmer and Jerry Lawler (22) | June 23, 1986 | Live event | Memphis, Tennessee | 1 | 25 | | |
| 435 | Fire and Flame | July 18, 1986 | Live event | Jackson, Tennessee | 1 | 43 | | |
| 436 | Giant Hillbilly Elmer and Cousin Junior | August 30, 1986 | Live event | Memphis, Tennessee | 1 | 2 | | |
| 437 | Don Bass and Dirty Rhodes | September 1, 1986 | Live event | Memphis, Tennessee | 1 | 63 | | |
| 438 | Big Bubba and Jerry Lawler (23) | November 3, 1986 | Live event | Memphis, Tennessee | 1 | 7 | | |
| — | Vacated | November 3, 1986 | — | — | — | — | Championship vacated when Bubba turned on Lawler after their win. | |
| 439 | The Sheepherders (Jonathan Boyd (7) and Bigfoot) | November 10, 1986 | Live event | Memphis, Tennessee | 5 | 7 | Defeated Jeff Jarrett and Billy Travis in a tournament final. | |
| 440 | Jeff Jarrett and Billy Travis | November 17, 1986 | Live event | Memphis, Tennessee | 1 | 49 | | |
| 441 | The Rock 'n' Roll RPMs (Mike Davis and Tommy Lane) | January 5, 1987 | Live event | Memphis, Tennessee | 1 | 7 | | |
| 442 | Jeff Jarrett and Billy Travis | January 12, 1987 | Live event | Memphis, Tennessee | 2 | 7 | | |
| 443 | The Rock 'n' Roll RPMs (Mike Davis and Tommy Lane) | January 20, 1987 | Live event | Memphis, Tennessee | 2 | 13 | | |
| 444 | Jeff Jarrett (3) and Pat Tanaka | February 2, 1987 | Live event | Memphis, Tennessee | 1 | 21 | | |
| 445 | Big Bubba and Goliath | February 23, 1987 | Live event | Memphis, Tennessee | 1 | 42 | | |
| 446 | Rocky Johnson and Soul Train Jones | April 6, 1987 | Live event | Memphis, Tennessee | 1 | 28 | | |
| 447 | Chick Donovan and Jack Hart | May 4, 1987 | Live event | Memphis, Tennessee | 1 | 35 | | |
| — | Vacated | June 1, 1987 | — | — | — | — | Defeated Phil Hickerson and Mr. Shima in a tournament final. | |
| 448 | Mark Starr and Billy Travis (3) | June 8, 1987 | Live event | Memphis, Tennessee | 1 | 28 | Defeated Phil Hickerson and Mr. Shima in a tournament final. | |
| 449 | The Clones (Mike and Pat Kelly) | July 6, 1987 | Live event | Memphis, Tennessee | 1 | 5 | | |
| — | Vacated | July 1987 | — | — | — | — | Championship vacated when one of the Clones was injured. | |
| 450 | Jeff Jarrett (4) and Billy Travis (4) | July 11, 1987 | Live event | Jackson, Tennessee | 3 | 28 | Defeated Badd Company in a tournament final. | |
| 451 | Badd Company (Paul Diamond and Pat Tanaka (2)) | August 8, 1987 | Live event | Jackson, Tennessee | 1 | 37 | | |
| 452 | The Nasty Boys (Brian Knobs and Jerry Sags) | September 14, 1987 | Live event | Memphis, Tennessee | 1 | 7 | | |
| 453 | The Rock 'n' Roll RPMs (Mike Davis and Tommy Lane) | September 21, 1987 | Live event | Memphis, Tennessee | 3 | 12 | | |
| 454 | The Nasty Boys (Brian Knobs and Jerry Sags) | October 3, 1987 | Live event | Memphis, Tennessee | 2 | 7 | | |
| 455 | The Rock 'n' Roll RPMs (Mike Davis and Tommy Lane) | October 10, 1987 | Live event | Memphis, Tennessee | 4 | 16 | | |
| 456 | The Midnight Rockers (Marty Jannetty and Shawn Michaels) | October 26, 1987 | Live event | Memphis, Tennessee | 1 | 21 | | |
| 457 | The Rock 'n' Roll RPMs (Mike Davis and Tommy Lane) | November 16, 1987 | Live event | Memphis, Tennessee | 5 | 6 | | |
| 458 | The Midnight Rockers (Marty Jannetty and Shawn Michaels) | November 22, 1987 | Live event | Memphis, Tennessee | 2 | 35 | | |
| — | Vacated | December 27, 1987 | — | — | — | — | Championship vacated because Rockers won the AWA World Tag Team Titles and could not hold more than one title. | |
| — | Deactivated | February 1, 1988 | — | — | — | — | | |

== Team reigns by combined length ==
Key

| Symbol | Meaning |
|---|---|
| ¤ | The exact length of at least one title reign is uncertain, so the shortest possible length is used. |

| Rank | Team | # of reigns | Combined days | |
|---|---|---|---|---|
| 1 | The Fabulous Ones (Steve Keirn and Stan Lane) | 15 | 381¤ | |
| 2 | Herb and Roy Welch | 2 | 366¤ | |
| 3 | Mario Milano and Len Rossi | 5 | 356¤ | |
| 4 | The Heavenly Bodies (Al and Don Greene) | 12 | 334¤ | |
| 5 | Don and Luke Fields | 5 | 331 | |
| 6 | Dante and Mephisto | 9 | 306¤ | |
| 7 | Al and John Smith | 2 | 265¤ | |
| 8 | The Bicentennial Kings (Dennis Condrey and Phil Hickerson) | 9 | 241¤ | |
| 9 | Mitsu Hirai and Tojo Yamamoto | 2 | 178¤ | |
| 10 | Karl and Skull Von Stroheim | 3 | 176 | |
| 10 | Bearcat Brown and Len Rossi | 5 | 176 | |
| 12 | Jerry Jarrett and Tojo Yamamoto | 7 | 168¤ | |
| 13 | Alex Perez and Tojo Yamamoto | 5 | 152¤ | |
| 13 | Johnny Long and Tojo Yamamoto | 5 | 152 | |
| 15 | The Medics (Tony Gonzales and Donald Lortie) | 6 | 141¤ | |
| 16 | Jackie Fargo and Lester Welch | 5 | 140 | |
| 17 | The Interns (Billy Garrett and Jim Starr) | 9 | 133¤ | |
| 18 | The Blond Bombers (Wayne Farris and Larry Latham) | 2 | 127¤ | |
| 19 | Bobby and Don Fields | 2 | 112 | |
| 20 | Bobby Eaton and Sweet Brown Sugar | 4 | 112¤ | |
| 21 | Jackie Fargo and Roughhouse Fargo / Sonny Fargo / Masked Rebel | 5 | 110 | |
| 22 | Eddie Gossett and Roy Welch | 1 | 104 | |
| 23 | Bill Dundee and Jerry Lawler | 4 | 103 | |
| 23 | Bill Dundee and Steve Keirn | 1 | 103 | |
| 25 | The Corsicans (Corsica Jean and Corsica Joe) | 6 | 102¤ | |
| 26 | The Sheepherders (Jonathan Boyd and Rip Morgan / Bigfoot) | 5 | 101¤ | |
| 27 | Jerry Lawler and Jim White | 8 | 97 | |
| 28 | The Assassins (Assassin #1 and Assassin #2) | 5 | 96¤ | |
| 29 | Jackie Fargo and Jerry Jarrett | 8 | 108 | |
| 29 | The MOD Squad (Spike and Basher) | 1 | 91 | |
| 31 | Don Carson and The Red Shadow | 8 | 85¤ | |
| 31 | Mr. Moto and Kinji Shibuya | 1 | 85¤ | |
| 33 | Eddie Gilbert and Tommy Rich | 1 | 84 | |
| 33 | Jeff Jarrett and Billy Travis | 3 | 84 | |
| 33 | Jos LeDuc and Jean Louie | 2 | 84¤ | |
| 36 | Jim Austeri and Tiny Mills | 1 | 83 | |
| 37 | The Bounty Hunters (David and Jerry Novak) | 5 | 82¤ | |
| 37 | Al Greene and Phil Hickerson | 3 | 82 | |
| 39 | Mike and Doc Gallagher | 1 | 77 | |
| 39 | The New Interns (Don Bass and Roger Smith) | 2 | 77 | |
| 41 | Tojo Yamamoto and Johnny Long | 3 | 76¤ | |
| 42 | The Mighty Yankees (Frank Morrell and Eddie Sullivan) | 6 | 74¤ | |
| 43 | Mike Clancy and Lester Welch | 1 | 73 | |
| 44 | Charlie Cook and Tommy Seigler | 1 | 72 | |
| 45 | Bill Dundee and Tommy Rich | 3 | 70 | |
| 46 | The Midnight Express (Norvell Austin, Dennis Condrey and Randy Rose) | 4 | 65 | |
| 47 | Danny Little Bear and Chief Thundercloud | 1 | 63 | |
| 47 | Bill Dundee and Robert Fuller | 2 | 63 | |
| 47 | Bobo Brazil and Bearcat Brown | 2 | 63 | |
| 47 | Don Bass and Dirty Rhodes | 1 | 63 | |
| 51 | Bill Dromo and Tojo Yamamoto | 1 | 62 | |
| 51 | Eddie Marlin and Tojo Yamamoto | 1 | 62 | |
| 51 | Ken Lucas and Ricky Morton | 3 | 62 | |
| 54 | The Blue Infernos | 2 | 60¤ | |
| 55 | Jackie Fargo and Len Rossi | 2 | 59 | |
| 55 | The Samoans (Afa and Sika) | 2 | 59 | |
| 57 | The Infernos (Ron Gibson and Stan Pulaski) | 2 | 56 | |
| 57 | Jerry Lawler and Jimmy Valiant | 1 | 56 | |
| 57 | Phil Hickerson and The Spoiler | 2 | 56 | |
| 57 | The Midnight Rockers (Marty Jannetty and Shawn Michaels) | 2 | 56 | |
| 61 | The Rock 'n' Roll RPMs (Mike Davis and Tommy Lane) | 5 | 55¤ | |
| 62 | The PYT Express (Norvell Austin and Koko Ware) | 3 | 53 | |
| 63 | Al Greene and Frank Martinez | 3 | 52¤ | |
| 64 | Jackie Fargo and Mario Milano | 2 | 51 | |
| 64 | Stan Lane and Sweet Brown Sugar | 1 | 51 | |
| 66 | Ray Andrews and Eric Pomeroy | 1 | 49¤ | |
| 66 | The Hollywood Blonds (Jerry Brown and Buddy Roberts) | 3 | 49 | |
| 66 | The Mighty Yankees (Eddie Sullivan and Mighty Yankee 3) | 2 | 49 | |
| 66 | Dick Beyer and Len Rossi | 1 | 49 | |
| 66 | Eddie Gilbert and Tommy Gilbert | 2 | 49 | |
| 66 | The Bruise Brothers (Dream Machine and Porkchop Cash) | 2 | 49 | |
| 66 | Wayne Farris and Kevin Sullivan | 1 | 49 | |
| 71 | Dennis Hall and Ken Lucas | 3 | 47 | |
| 71 | Bill Dundee and Dream Machine | 3 | 47 | |
| 71 | The Sheepherders (Jonathan Boyd and Luke Williams) | 2 | 47¤ | |
| 73 | George and Bobby Becker | 1 | 45 | |
| 74 | Jackie Fargo and Don Greene | 1 | 44 | |
| 75 | Fire and Flame | 1 | 43 | |
| 75 | Ray Piret and Tex Riley | 1 | 43¤ | |
| 77 | Big Bubba and Goliath | 1 | 42¤ | |
| 77 | Ricky Gibson and Robert Gibson | 4 | 42¤ | |
| 77 | The Grapplers (Tony Anthony and Len Denton) | 1 | 42 | |
| 77 | Big Bad John and Bill Dundee | 2 | 42¤ | |
| 77 | Chief Little Bear and Mack York | 1 | 42¤ | |
| 82 | The Von Brauners (Karl and Kurt Von Brauner) | 3 | 41¤ | |
| 82 | Tommy Gilbert and Eddie Marlin | 5 | 41 | |
| 84 | The Interns (Tom Andrews and Jim Starr) | 2 | 39 | |
| 85 | Danny Hodge and Mario Milano | 1 | 38¤ | |
| 86 | Badd Company (Paul Diamond and Pat Tanaka) | 1 | 37 | |
| 87 | Bobby Eaton and Duke Myers | 2 | 36¤ | |
| 87 | Masa Fuchi and Mr. Onita | 3 | 36 | |
| 87 | Masked Bat and Finis Hall | 1 | 36 | |
| 90 | Rufus R. Jones and Roughhouse Fargo | 1 | 35 | |
| 90 | Chick Donovan and Jack Hart | 1 | 35 | |
| 90 | Ricky Gibson and Tommy Gilbert | 1 | 35 | |
| 90 | Don Greene and Scorpion | 1 | 35 | |
| 90 | Austin Idol and Jerry Lawler | 1 | 35¤ | |
| 90 | Dennis Condrey and David Schultz | 1 | 35¤ | |
| 90 | Gorgeous George Jr. and Porkchop Cash | 1 | 35 | |
| 97 | Gino and Tony Calza | 1 | 34 | |
| 97 | The Zambuie Express (Elijah Akeem and Kareem Muhammad) | 3 | 34 | |
| 100 | George Barnes and Bill Dundee | 2 | 32¤ | |
| 101 | Jerry Lawler and Tojo Yamamoto | 2 | 31¤ | |
| 102 | The Continental Warriors (Lorenzo Parente and Bobby Hart) | 1 | 30 | |
| 103 | Norvell Austin and Sputnik Monroe | 3 | 29¤ | |
| 104 | Mark Starr and Billy Travis | 1 | 28 | |
| 104 | Bill Dundee and Dutch Mantel | 1 | 28 | |
| 104 | Jerry Lawler and Al Greene | 1 | 28 | |
| 104 | Killer Karl Krupp and El Mongol | 1 | 28¤ | |
| 104 | Rocky Johnson and Soul Train Jones | 1 | 28 | |
| 104 | Ron Bass and Stan Lane | 2 | 28 | |
| 109 | Robert Fuller and Toru Tanaka | 1 | 27 | |
| 110 | The Nightmares (Danny Davis and Ken Wayne) | 1 | 26¤ | |
| 111 | Giant Hillbilly Elmer and Jerry Lawler | 1 | 25¤ | |
| 112 | Dutch Mantel and Tommy Rich | 1 | 23 | |
| 112 | Norvell Austin and Bill Dundee | | 23 | |
| 114 | Frazier and Terry Sawyer | 1 | 22 | |
| 114 | Tex Riley and Len Rossi | 3 | 22 | |
| 114 | Jackie Fargo and Mr. Wrestling | 1 | 22 | |
| 117 | Charlie Fulton and Bobby Mayne | 1 | 21 | |
| 117 | Ivan Malenkov and Tojo Yamamoto | 1 | 21 | |
| 117 | Bob Ramstead and Johnny Walker | 1 | 21¤ | |
| 117 | Bob Ellis and Jim Garvin | 1 | 21 | |
| 117 | Dutch Mantel and David Schultz | 1 | 21 | |
| 117 | Jeff Jarrett and Pat Tanaka | 1 | 21 | |
| 117 | Jerry Lawler and Mongolian Stomper | 1 | 21 | |
| 117 | Mr. Fuji and Toru Tanaka | 1 | 21 | |
| 117 | Paul Ellering and Sheik Ali Hassan | 1 | 21 | |
| 117 | Robert Fuller and Bearcat Brown | 1 | 21 | |
| 117 | Steve Keirn and Bill Dundee | 2 | 21 | |
| 117 | The Moondogs (Rex and Spot) | 1 | 21 | |
| 117 | Bearcat Brown and Tommy Gilbert | 2 | 21¤ | |
| 117 | The Fabulous Fargos (Fargo and Randy Fargo) | 1 | 20¤ | |
| 131 | Tojo Yamamoto and Bill Dundee | 1 | 20 | |
| 131 | Tommy Gilbert and Bearcat Brown | 1 | 20¤ | |
| 133 | Otto Von Heller and Karl Von Steiger | 2 | 19 | |
| 134 | Norvell Austin and Pat Barrett | 2 | 18 | |
| 135 | Jimmy Golden and Tojo Yamamoto | 1 | 17¤ | |
| 135 | Tor Kamata and Tojo Yamamoto | 1 | 17 | |
| 135 | 138 | The New Bounty Hunters (Tom Andrews and Jim Starr) | 1 | 16 |
| Kevin Sullivan and Wayne Ferris | 138 | 1 | 16 | |
| Tojo Yamamoto and Alex Perez | 138 | 1 | 16 | |
| 141 | Roger Kirby and David Schultz | 1 | 15 | |
| 141 | 143 | Frankie Cain and Mike Clancy | 1 | 14¤ |
| John Smith and Tosh Togo | 143 | 1 | 14 | |
| Herb Welch and Chris Belkas | 143 | 1 | 14 | |
| Bill Dundee and Ricky Gibson | 143 | 1 | 14 | |
| Dutch Mantel and Koko Ware | 143 | 1 | 14 | |
| Jackie Fargo and Dennis Hall | 143 | 1 | 14 | |
| Jackie Fargo and Tex Riley | 143 | 1 | 14¤ | |
| Jerry Lawler and Jos LeDuc | 143 | 1 | 14 | |
| Johnny Walker and Tojo Yamamoto | 143 | 1 | 14 | |
| Johnny Walker and Bearcat Brown | 143 | 1 | 14 | |
| Ken Lucas and Johnny Walker | 143 | 2 | 14¤ | |
| King Kong Bundy and Rick Rude | 143 | 1 | 14 | |
| The Nasty Boys (Brian Knobs and Jerry Sags) | 143 | 2 | 14 | |
| The Rock 'n' Roll Express (Robert Gibson and Ricky Morton) | 143 | 2 | 14 | |
| The Angel and Sonny King | 143 | 1 | 14 | |
| 157 | Roger Kirby and Guy Mitchell | 1 | 13 | |
| 157 | Dick Beyer and Tex Riley | 1 | 13 | |
| 157 | Hector Guerrero and Steve Regal | 1 | 13 | |
| 157 | Ken Lucas and Billy Robinson | 3 | 13¤ | |
| 157 | Rocky Johnson and Jimmy Valiant | 1 | 13 | |
| 162 | Rip and Tim Tyler | 1 | 11¤ | |
| 162 | Tojo Yamamoto and Robert Fuller | 2 | 11¤ | |
| 164 | The Great Higami and Tojo Yamamoto | 1 | 10 | |
| 164 | Doug Lindsey and Treach Phillips | 1 | 10¤ | |
| 166 | Gypsy Joe Dorsetti and Skull Murphy | 2 | 9 | |
| 166 | Ken Lucas and Ricky Morton | 1 | 9¤ | |
| 166 | Jerry Lawler and Scorpion | 1 | 9 | |
| 169 | Don Carson and Dennis Condrey | 1 | 8 | |
| 169 | Buddy Fuller and Lester Welch | 2 | 8 | |
| 169 | Dennis Hall and Johnny Long | 1 | 8 | |
| 169 | Tommy Gilbert and Tommy Rich | 1 | 8 | |
| 173 | Ron and Terry Garvin | 1 | 7 | |
| 173 | Big Bubba and Jerry Lawler | 1 | 7 | |
| 173 | George and Jack Curtis | 1 | 7 | |
| 173 | Dream Machine and Jim Mitchell | 1 | 7 | |
| 173 | Bobby and Lee Fields | 1 | 7 | |
| 173 | The Heartbreakers (Joey Cagle and Rocky Sortor) | 1 | 7¤ | |
| 173 | Sonny King and Ricky Morton | 1 | 7 | |
| 173 | Tomayo Soto and The Great Yamaha | 1 | 7¤ | |
| 173 | The Sundown Kid and Johnny Walker | 1 | 7¤ | |
| 173 | Lester Welch and Jackie Fargo | 1 | 7 | |
| 173 | Al Greene and Sir Clements | 1 | 7 | |
| 173 | Bill Irwin and Larry Latham | 1 | 7 | |
| 173 | Eddie Gilbert and Ricky Morton | 1 | 7¤ | |
| 173 | Jackie Fargo and Lou Thesz | 1 | 7 | |
| 173 | Jerry Jarrett and Johnny Marlin | 1 | 7¤ | |
| 173 | Jerry Lawler and Playboy Frazier | 1 | 7 | |
| 173 | Steve Keirn and Terry Taylor | 1 | 7 | |
| 173 | Tojo Yamamoto and Roughhouse Fargo | 1 | 7 | |
| 173 | Bearcat Brown and Les Thatcher | 1 | 7 | |
| 192 | Lester Welch and Buddy Fuller | 1 | 6 | |
| 193 | The Clones (Mike and Pat Kelly) | 1 | 5 | |
| 193 | Dennis Hall and Johnny Walker | 3 | 5 | |
| 193 | Great Bolo and Joe McCarthy | 1 | 5 | |
| 196 | The Fabulous Fargos (Don and Jackie Fargo) | 2 | 3¤ | |
| 196 | Karl Kowalski and Ivan Kowalski | 2 | 3 | |
| 196 | Bill and Joe Sky | 2 | 3 | |
| 199 | Giant Hillbilly Elmer and Cousin Junior | 1 | 2 | |
| 199 | Lester Welch and Eddie Graham | 2 | 2 | |
| 199 | Wayne Farris and Tojo Yamamoto | 1 | 2¤ | |
| 202 | Corsica Joe and Chin Lee | 1 | 1¤ | |
| 202 | John and Al Smith | 1 | 1¤ | |
| 202 | George Becker and Jack Witzig | 1 | 1¤ | |
| 202 | Wild Bill Canny and Buddy Knox | 1 | 1¤ | |
| 202 | Wild Bill Canny and Carlos Rodriguez Cortez | 1 | 1¤ | |
| 202 | Mike Chacoma and Red Roberts | 1 | 1¤ | |
| 202 | The Dirty Daltons (Frank Dalton and Jack Dalton) | 1 | 1¤ | |
| 202 | Leo and Chick Garibaldi | 1 | 1¤ | |
| 202 | Henry Harrell and Rex Mobley | 1 | 1¤ | |
| 202 | Billy and Jimmy Hines | 1 | 1¤ | |
| 202 | Pat O'Brien and Karl Kowalski | 1 | 1¤ | |
| 202 | Eduardo Perez and Red Roberts | 1 | 1¤ | |
| 202 | Ray Piret and Herb Welch | 1 | 1¤ | |
| 202 | Len Rossi and Bad Boy Hines | 1 | 1¤ | |
| 202 | Len Rossi and Tomayo Soto | 1 | 1¤ | |
| 202 | Paul Stanlee and Jack Welch | 1 | 1¤ | |
| 202 | Eddie Gossett and Tex Riley | 1 | 1¤ | |
| 202 | Johnny Walker and Len Rossi | 1 | 1¤ | |
| 202 | Johnny Walker and Bob Ramstead | 1 | 1¤ | |
| 202 | Ken Lucas and Dennis Hall | 1 | 1¤ | |
| 202 | The Fabulous Freebirds (Terry Gordy and Michael Hayes) | 1 | 1¤ | |
| 202 | Tojo Yamamoto and Jimmy Golden | 1 | 1¤ | |
| 202 | Stan Frazier and Dennis Hall | 1 | 1¤ | |
| 202 | Golden Hawk and Johnny Kostas | 1 | 1¤ | |
| 202 | Lozano and Jack Purdin | 1 | 1¤ | |

== Individual reigns by combined length ==
Key

| Symbol | Meaning |
|---|---|
| ¤ | The exact length of at least one title reign is uncertain, so the shortest possible length is used. |

| Rank | Wrestler | # of reigns | Combined days |
|---|---|---|---|
| 1 | Tojo Yamamoto | 35 | 942¤ |
| 2 | Len Rossi | 19 | 665¤ |
| 3 | Jackie Fargo | 30 | 579¤ |
| 4 | Bill Dundee | 22 | 566¤ |
| 5 | Steve Keirn | 19 | 525¤ |
| 6 | Al Greene | 20 | 503¤ |
| 7 | Roy Welch | 3 | 470¤ |
| 8 | Stan Lane | 18 | 460¤ |
| 9 | Don Fields | 7 | 443 |
| 10 | Don Greene / Mr. Wrestling | 15 | 435¤ |
| 11 | Jerry Lawler | 22 | 426¤ |
| 12 | Mario Milano | 7 | 415¤ |
| 13 | Herb Welch | 5 | 395¤ |
| 14 | Phil Hickerson | 14 | 379¤ |
| 15 | Dennis Condrey | 15 | 349¤ |
| 16 | Luke Fields | 5 | 331 |
| 17 | Bearcat Brown | 13 | 322¤ |
| 18 | Dante | 9 | 306¤ |
| 18 | Mephisto | 9 | 306¤ |
| 20 | Jerry Jarrett | 16 | 283¤ |
| 21 | John Smith | 3 | 279¤ |
| 22 | Al Smith | 3 | 266¤ |
| 23 | Lester Welch | 12 | 236 |
| 24 | Koko Ware / Sweet Brown Sugar | 9 | 230¤ |
| 25 | Eddie Gossett / Graham / Marlin | 10 | 210 |
| 26 | Wayne Ferris | 5 | 194¤ |
| 27 | Jim Starr | 12 | 188¤ |
| 27 | Norvell Austin | 13 | 188¤ |
| 29 | Tommy Rich | 6 | 185 |
| 30 | Mitsu Hirai | 2 | 178¤ |
| 31 | Karl Von Stroheim | 3 | 176 |
| 31 | Skull Von Stroheim | 3 | 176 |
| 33 | Don Bass / Scorpion | 4 | 175 |
| 34 | Tommy Gilbert | 12 | 174¤ |
| 35 | Sonny Fargo / Roughhouse Fargo / Masked Rebel | 8 | 172¤ |
| 36 | Alex Perez | 6 | 168¤ |
| 37 | Johnny Long | 6 | 161¤ |
| 38 | Bobby Eaton | 6 | 148¤ |
| 38 | Jonathan Boyd | 7 | 148¤ |
| 40 | Tony Gonzales | 6 | 141¤ |
| 40 | Donald Lortie | 6 | 141¤ |
| 42 | Eddie Gilbert | 4 | 140¤ |
| 43 | Ken Lucas | 12 | 137¤ |
| 44 | Larry Latham | 3 | 134¤ |
| 45 | Billy Garrett | 9 | 133¤ |
| 46 | Eddie Sullivan | 8 | 123¤ |
| 47 | Robert Fuller | 6 | 122¤ |
| 48 | Bobby Fields | 3 | 119 |
| 49 | Billy Travis | 4 | 112 |
| 50 | Stan Pulaski / Eric Pomeroy | 3 | 105¤ |
| 50 | Jeff Jarrett | 4 | 105 |
| 51 | Dream Machine | 6 | 103 |
| 52 | Corsica Joe | 6 | 102¤ |
| 52 | Corsica Jean | 6 | 102¤ |
| 54 | Rip Morgan / Bigfoot | 5 | 101¤ |
| 55 | Ricky Morton | 8 | 99¤ |
| 56 | Jos LeDuc | 2 | 98¤ |
| 57 | Jim White | 8 | 97 |
| 58 | Assassin #1 | 5 | 96¤ |
| 58 | Assassin #2 | 5 | 96¤ |
| 60 | Tex Riley | 7 | 93¤ |
| 61 | Don Carson | 9 | 92¤ |
| 62 | Ricky Gibson | 6 | 91¤ |
| 62 | Basher | 1 | 91 |
| 62 | Spike | 1 | 91 |
| 65 | Mike Clancy | 1 | 87¤ |
| 66 | Dutch Mantel | 4 | 86 |
| 67 | The Red Shadow | 8 | 85¤ |
| 67 | Kinji Shibuya | 1 | 85¤ |
| 67 | Mr. Moto | 1 | 85¤ |
| 70 | Jean Louie | 2 | 84¤ |
| 70 | Porkchop Cash | 3 | 84 |
| 72 | Jim Austeri | 1 | 83 |
| 72 | Tiny Mills | 1 | 83 |
| 74 | David Novak | 5 | 82¤ |
| 74 | Jerry Novak | 5 | 82¤ |
| 76 | Doc Gallagher | 1 | 77 |
| 76 | Mike Gallagher | 1 | 77 |
| 76 | Roger Smith | 2 | 77 |
| 76 | Johnny Walker | 11 | 77¤ |
| 80 | Dennis Hall | 10 | 76¤ |
| 81 | Frank Morrell | 6 | 74¤ |
| 82 | Charlie Cook | 1 | 72 |
| 82 | Tommy Seigler | 1 | 72 |
| 84 | David Schultz | 3 | 71¤ |
| 85 | Kevin Sullivan | 1 | 65 |
| 85 | Randy Rose | 4 | 65 |
| 87 | Danny Little Bear | 1 | 63 |
| 87 | Dirty Rhodes | 1 | 63 |
| 87 | Bobo Brazil | 2 | 63 |
| 87 | Chief Thundercloud | 1 | 63 |
| 91 | Bill Dromo | 1 | 62 |
| 91 | Dick Beyer | 2 | 62 |
| 93 | Blue Inferno 1 | 2 | 60¤ |
| 93 | Blue Inferno 2 | 2 | 60¤ |
| 95 | Afa | 2 | 59 |
| 95 | Sika | 2 | 59 |
| 97 | Pat Tanaka | 2 | 58 |
| 98 | Plowboy / Playbo / Stan Frazier, Giant Hillbilly Elmer | 5 | 57¤ |
| 99 | Ron Gibson | 2 | 56 |
| 99 | The Spoiler | 2 | 56 |
| 99 | Marty Jannetty | 2 | 56 |
| 99 | Robert Gibson | 6 | 56¤ |
| 99 | Shawn Michaels | 2 | 56 |
| 104 | Tom Andrews | 3 | 55 |
| 104 | Mike Davis | 5 | 55¤ |
| 104 | Tommy Lane | 5 | 55¤ |
| 107 | Frank Martinez | 3 | 52¤ |
| 108 | Ray Andrews | 1 | 49¤ |
| 108 | Big Bubba | 2 | 49¤ |
| 108 | Jerry Brown | 3 | 49 |
| 108 | Buddy Roberts | 3 | 49 |
| 108 | Mighty Yankee 3 | 2 | 49 |
| 113 | Toru Tanaka | 2 | 48 |
| 114 | Luke Williams | 2 | 47¤ |
| 115 | Bobby Becker | 1 | 45 |
| 115 | George Becker | 1 | 45 |
| 117 | Ray Piret | 2 | 44¤ |
| 118 | Fire | 1 | 43 |
| 118 | Flame | 1 | 43 |
| 120 | Mack York | 1 | 42¤ |
| 120 | Len Denton | 1 | 42 |
| 120 | Tony Anthony | 1 | 42 |
| 120 | Big Bad John | 2 | 42¤ |
| 120 | Chief Little Bear | 1 | 42¤ |
| 120 | Goliath | 1 | 42¤ |
| 126 | Karl Von Brauner | 3 | 41¤ |
| 126 | Kurt Von Brauner | 3 | 41¤ |
| 126 | Rocky Johnson | 2 | 41 |
| 129 | Danny Hodge | 1 | 38¤ |
| 130 | Paul Diamond | 1 | 37 |
| 131 | Finis Hall | 1 | 36 |
| 131 | Onita | 3 | 36 |
| 131 | Duke Myers | 2 | 36¤ |
| 131 | Masa Fuchi | 3 | 36 |
| 131 | Masked Bat | 1 | 36 |
| 136 | Chick Donovan | 1 | 35 |
| 136 | Austin Idol | 1 | 35¤ |
| 136 | Jack Hart | 1 | 35 |
| 136 | Rufus R. Jones | 1 | 35 |
| 136 | Gorgeous George Jr. | 1 | 35 |
| 141 | Gino Calza | 1 | 34 |
| 141 | Tony Calza | 1 | 34 |
| 141 | Eljiah Akeem | 3 | 34 |
| 141 | Kareem Muhammad | 3 | 34 |
| 145 | George Barnes | 2 | 32¤ |
| 146 | Bobby Hart | 1 | 30 |
| 146 | Lorenzo Parente | 1 | 30 |
| 146 | Mario Milano | 1 | 30 |
| 149 | Sputnik Monroe | 3 | 29¤ |
| 150 | Roger Kirby | 2 | 28 |
| 150 | Mark Starr | 1 | 28 |
| 150 | El Mongol | 1 | 28¤ |
| 150 | Killer Karl Krupp | 1 | 28¤ |
| 150 | Ron Bass | 2 | 28 |
| 150 | Soul Train Jones | 1 | 28 |
| 156 | Ken Wayne | 1 | 26¤ |
| 156 | Danny Davis | 1 | 26¤ |
| 158 | Bob Ramstead | 2 | 22¤ |
| 158 | Terry Sawyer | 1 | 22 |
| 160 | Mongolian Stomper | 1 | 21 |
| 160 | Charlie Fulton | 1 | 21 |
| 160 | Sheik Ali Hassan | 1 | 21 |
| 160 | Sonny King | 2 | 21 |
| 160 | Ivan Malenkov | 1 | 21 |
| 160 | Bobby Mayne | 1 | 21 |
| 160 | Spot | 1 | 21 |
| 160 | Bob Ellis | 1 | 21 |
| 160 | Jim Garvin | 1 | 21 |
| 160 | Mr. Fuji | 1 | 21 |
| 160 | Paul Ellering | 1 | 21 |
| 160 | The Moondogs | 1 | 21 |
| 172 | Fargo | 1 | 20¤ |
| 173 | Otto Von Heller | 2 | 19 |
| 173 | Karl Von Steiger | 2 | 19 |
| 175 | Jimmy Golden | 2 | 18¤ |
| 175 | Pat Barrett | 2 | 18 |
| 177 | Tor Kamata | 1 | 17 |
| 178 | Chris Belkas | 1 | 14 |
| 178 | Frankie Cain | 1 | 14¤ |
| 178 | Buddy Fuller | 3 | 14 |
| 178 | Brian Knobs | 2 | 14 |
| 178 | Jerry Sags | 2 | 14 |
| 178 | King Kong Bundy | 1 | 14 |
| 178 | Rick Rude | 1 | 14 |
| 178 | Tosh Togo | 1 | 14 |
| 178 | The Angel | 1 | 14 |
| 187 | Guy Mitchell | 1 | 13 |
| 187 | Billy Robinson | 3 | 13¤ |
| 187 | Hector Guerrero | 1 | 13 |
| 187 | Jimmy Valiant | 1 | 13 |
| 187 | Steve Regal | 1 | 13 |
| 192 | Rip Tyler | 1 | 11¤ |
| 192 | Tim Tyler | 1 | 11¤ |
| 194 | The Great Higami | 1 | 10 |
| 194 | Doug Lindsey | 1 | 10¤ |
| 194 | Treach Phillips | 1 | 10¤ |
| 197 | Skull Murphy | 2 | 9 |
| 197 | Gypsy Joe Dorsetti | 2 | 9 |
| 197 | Ken Lucas | 1 | 9¤ |
| 197 | Scorpion | 1 | 9 |
| 201 | Tomayo Soto | 2 | 8¤ |
| 202 | Joey Cagle | 1 | 7¤ |
| 202 | George Curtis | 1 | 7 |
| 202 | Jack Curtis | 1 | 7 |
| 202 | Lee Fields | 1 | 7 |
| 202 | The Great Yamaha | 1 | 7¤ |
| 202 | Johnny Marlin | 1 | 7¤ |
| 202 | Jim Mitchell | 1 | 7 |
| 202 | Rocky Sortor | 1 | 7¤ |
| 202 | The Sundown Kid | 1 | 7¤ |
| 202 | Bill Irwin | 1 | 7 |
| 202 | Les Thatcher | 1 | 7 |
| 202 | Lou Thesz | 1 | 7 |
| 202 | Terry Garvin | 1 | 7 |
| 202 | Terry Taylor | 1 | 7 |
| 202 | Ron Garvin | 1 | 7 |
| 202 | Sir Clements | 1 | 7 |
| 218 | Mike Kelly | 1 | 5 |
| 218 | Pat Kelly | 1 | 5 |
| 218 | Joe McCarthy | 1 | 5 |
| 218 | Great Bolo | 1 | 5 |
| 222 | Karl Kowalski | 3 | 4¤ |
| 223 | Don Fargo | 2 | 3¤ |
| 223 | Ivan Kowalski | 2 | 3 |
| 223 | Bill Sky | 2 | 3 |
| 223 | Joe Sky | 2 | 3 |
| 227 | Cousin Junior | 1 | 2 |
| 227 | Wild Bill Canny | 2 | 2 |
| 227 | Red Roberts | 2 | 2¤ |
| 230 | Mike Chacoma | 1 | 1¤ |
| 230 | Carlos Rodriguez Cortez | 1 | 1¤ |
| 230 | Frank Dalton | 1 | 1¤ |
| 230 | Jack Dalton | 1 | 1¤ |
| 230 | Chick Garibaldi | 1 | 1¤ |
| 230 | Leo Garibaldi | 1 | 1¤ |
| 230 | Henry Harrell | 1 | 1¤ |
| 230 | Bad Boy Hines | 1 | 1¤ |
| 230 | Billy Hines | 1 | 1¤ |
| 230 | Jimmy Hines | 1 | 1¤ |
| 230 | Buddy Knox | 1 | 1¤ |
| 230 | Johnny Kostas | 1 | 1¤ |
| 230 | Chin Lee | 1 | 1¤ |
| 230 | Rex Mobley | 1 | 1¤ |
| 230 | Pat O'Brien | 1 | 1¤ |
| 230 | Eduardo Perez | 1 | 1¤ |
| 230 | Paul Stanlee | 1 | 1¤ |
| 230 | Jack Welch | 1 | 1¤ |
| 230 | Jack Witzig | 1 | 1¤ |
| 230 | Michael Hayes | 1 | 1¤ |
| 230 | Terry Gordy | 1 | 1¤ |
| 230 | Corsica Joe | 1 | 1¤ |
| 230 | Al Smith | 1 | 1¤ |
| 230 | Golden Hawk | 1 | 1¤ |
| 230 | Lozano | 1 | ¤ |
| 230 | Jack Purdin | 1 | ¤ |

== See also ==
- NWA Southern Heavyweight Championship (Florida version) – the version of the title used in Championship Wrestling from Florida
- NWA Southern Tag Team Championship – the NWA board-controlled version of the title
