= Tommy Lane =

American wrestler (born 1960)

Personal information
- Born: Tommy Lee Jones; November 24, 1960 (age 65) Georgia, U.S.

Professional wrestling career
- Ring name(s): DJ RPM; Jeff Gouldie; Mongolian Stomper Jr. Tommy Lane; Tommy Rogers
- Billed weight: 229 lb (104 kg; 16.4 st)
- Debut: 1981
- Retired: 2003

Tommy Lee Jones (born November 24, 1960) was an American professional wrestler, better known by his ring name, Tommy Lane. Lane is best known for his appearances in Southern United States professional wrestling promotions as one-half of the tag team the Rock 'n' Roll RPMs with Mike Davis.

== Professional wrestling career ==
=== Early career ===
Jones started wrestling in the NWA's Central States promotion in 1981 under the name Tommy Rogers (not to be confused with the Tommy Rogers of the Fantastics tag team). In the summer of 1984, he and Marty Jannetty formed a duo called the Uptown Boys, and twice won the NWA Central States Tag Team Championship.

Jones also wrestled as Jeff Gouldie, the (kayfabe) son of Archie Gouldie, who also competed as the Mongolian Stomper. This storyline also allowed Jones to adopt the in-ring nickname Mongolian Stomper, Jr.

=== Rock 'n' Roll RPMs ===
Using the Tommy Lane moniker, Jones made his way to World Wrestling Council, which at the time was still affiliated with the NWA. He started a tag team with Mike Davis called the Rock 'n' Roll RPMs. They had feuds with Ron Starr and Chicky Starr. Later they went to World Class Championship Wrestling. The RPMs feuded with The Fantastics over the WCWA Tag Team Championship, as well, but were unable to win the title.

The RPMs then competed in the CWA in Memphis, where they won the AWA Southern Tag Team Championship twice, and feuded with The Midnight Rockers. They would also have Downtown Bruno as their manager. They would also go across the state to Knoxville, wrestling for USA Championship Wrestling, where they won the USA Tag Team Championship once. Teaming with Cactus Jack, the Rock-n-Roll RPMs lost a six-man match against Hector, Chavo, and Mando Guerrero at the only AWA pay-per-view, SuperClash III.

=== Semi-activity ===
In 1989, the RPMs split when Lane retired from active competition and Davis went to the Continental Wrestling Federation. Lane would wrestle occasionally for many years, including a return to Canada, which lasted six years, before finally retiring completely in 2003.

== Championships and accomplishments ==
- Central All-Star Championship Wrestling
  - CACW Heavyweight Championship (1 time)
- Central States Wrestling
  - NWA Central States Tag Team Championship (2 times) – with Marty Jannetty
- Continental Wrestling Association / Championship Wrestling Association
  - AWA Southern Tag Team Championship (5 times) – with Mike Davis
  - CWA Tag Team Championship (1 times) – with Mike Davis
- Southeast Championship Wrestling
  - NWA Southeastern Tag Team Championship (1 time) – with Mongolian Stomper
- USA Championship Wrestling
  - USA Tag Team Championship (1 time) with Mike Davis
- World Wrestling Council
  - WWC World Tag Team Championship (2 times) – with Mike Davis
