= Mike Davis (wrestler) =

American professional wrestler (1956-2001)

Personal information
- Born: Michael Davis; November 2, 1956 Greenville, South Carolina, U.S.
- Died: December 25, 2001 (aged 45) Granbury, Texas, U.S.

Professional wrestling career
- Ring name(s): Mike Davis; Michael Worhington III; The Viper; Aries; The Dream
- Billed height: 6 ft 4 in (1.93 m)
- Billed weight: 235 lb (107 kg; 16.8 st)
- Billed from: Tampa, Florida
- Trained by: Lars Anderson; Vince Castelli
- Debut: 1977
- Retired: 2000

Michael Davis (November 2, 1956 – December 25, 2001) was an American professional wrestler best known as one half of the tag team Rock 'n' Roll RPMs with Tommy Lane which lasted several years. The RPM's were one of the best-known heel tag teams throughout the southern United States in promotions such as World Class Championship Wrestling and the Continental Wrestling Association based out of Memphis. Mike Davis was also a member of Kevin Sullivan's faction known as the Army of Darkness.

== Career ==
Trained by both Lars Anderson and Vince Castelli, Mike Davis got his start in Eddie Graham's Championship Wrestling from Florida (CWF) promotion. He found himself working as a member of Kevin Sullivan's faction, known collectively as the Army of Darkness. In both 1983 and 1984, he spent a few months working for the promotions All Japan Pro Wrestling and New Japan Pro-Wrestling. At the 1984 Starrcade event, he lost the NWA Junior Heavyweight Title to Denny Brown (whom he was an admirer of).

Davis formed a tag team known as the Rock 'n' Roll RPMs with Tommy Lane. They spent time wrestling in the mid 80's in Memphis before making their move to the World Class promotion, which at the time was still affiliated with the NWA. Dusty Rhodes had the idea of making them a tag team as he wanted a heel tag team, bleached blond with dark beards, according to Davis in a 2001 interview. With the team being known for their bright colored tights and hanging bandanas, The Rock 'n' Roll RPMs were glorified for their finishing move "The Spandex Splits", which would eventually turn out to be outlawed as the move caused extensive neck injuries.

They had feuds with several teams, including another "Rock 'n' Roll" tag team known as the Rock 'n' Roll Express. There was once a program where The Rockers turned on them, an idea Shawn Michaels requested to Jerry Lawler. The RPMs feuded with The Fantastics over the WCWA Tag Team Championship, however they were unable to win the championship. The RPMs also competed in the CWA in Memphis, where they won two AWA Southern Tag Team titles. Teaming with Cactus Jack, the Rock-n-Roll RPMs lost a match against Hector, Chavo, and Mando Guerrero at the only AWA pay-per-view SuperClash III.

Davis made appearances for the World Wrestling Federation in 1989 and 1990, working as a jobber, losing to the likes of Jim Duggan, Jim "The Anvil" Neidhart and The Rockers. It was during this time he worked for the United States Wrestling Association in Memphis. After the demise of World Class, Davis and Lane moved on to World Championship Wrestling, where they were used as jobbers. Davis later entered the Global Wrestling Federation, where in 1991, he claimed to have returned to Earth with a "Moon Rock" after he made a bungee jump following a "Bungee" match between Chaz Taylor and Steven Dane outside the Dallas Sportatorium. Mike Davis formed another tag team, this time with his brother Tom Davis known collectively as the Dirty Davis Brothers. In 1995, Davis returned to WCW to work once again as a 'jobber to the stars', featuring on the WCW Saturday Night program. He also returned to Japan to work for and make appearances in Big Japan Pro Wrestling. In 1998, he returned to the WWF in a dark match, losing to John Tenta. He continued working in the independent circuit in Texas until wrestling his last match in 2000.

== Death ==
On December 25, 2001, in Granbury, Texas, he told his wife that he was not feeling well. Later that night, Davis died of a massive heart attack at the age of 46, He was the third World Class wrestler to die in six months (following the deaths of Terry Gordy and Chris Adams in July and October respectively).

== Championships and accomplishments ==
- Big D Wrestling

- Big D Tag Team Championship (2 times) - with Terry Simms

- Championship Wrestling from Florida
  - NWA United States Tag Team Championship (Florida version) (1 time) – with Mike Rotunda
- Continental Wrestling Association / Championship Wrestling Association
  - AWA Southern Tag Team Championship (5 times) – with Tommy Lane
  - CWA Tag Team Championship (1 time) – with Tommy Lane
- Continental Wrestling Federation
  - CWF Tag Team Championship (1 time) – with Masahiro Chono
- Georgia Championship Wrestling
  - NWA Georgia Junior Heavyweight Championship (1 time)
- Global Wrestling Federation
  - GWF Television Championship (1 time)
- USA Wrestling
  - USA Tag Team Championship (1 time) - with Tommy Lane
- World Wrestling Council
  - WWC World Tag Team Championship (2 times) – with Tommy Lane

== See also ==
- List of premature professional wrestling deaths
