= Bruise Brothers (professional wrestling) =

Professional wrestling tag team

Tag team
- Members: Porkchop Cash; Dream Machine; Mad Dog Boyd; Jimmy Hart (Manager)
- Billed heights: Porkchop Cash: 6 ft 0 in (1.83 m); Dream Machine: 5 ft 11 in (1.80 m)
- Combined billed weight: 471 Ib (214 kg)
- Debut: 1982
- Disbanded: 1983

The Bruise Brothers was a professional wrestling tag team, composed of Porkchop Cash and Dream Machine, and later Mad Dog Boyd.

== History ==
In 1982, Porkchop Cash joined Jerry Jarrett's Continental Wrestling Association based in Memphis, Tennessee. Cash soon formed a tag team with Troy Graham (who wrestled as "Dream Machine") known as the Bruise Brothers. Wrestling as heels, they held the AWA Southern Tag Team Championship twice. The Bruise Brothers were in the First Family stable of Jimmy Hart. Their main rivals were The Sheepherders, as tag team from New Zealand. They beat Dutch Mantel and Koko B. Ware for their first title on October 3, 1983. They also had a series matches with the Rock 'n' Roll Express, trading the AWA Southern Tag Team Championship with them. A notable moment in the feud came after their match on November 7, 1983. Cash and Graham lost the match and the belts and responded by attacking the referee, Paul Morton (father of Ricky Morton of the Rock 'n' Roll Express). The Bruise Brothers avenged their loss one week later by regaining the championship. On November 29, 1983, the Bruise Brothers dropped the belts to the Fabulous Ones. Tension built within Hart's stable, and The Bruise Brothers faced stablemates The Grapplers (Len Denton and Tony Anthony) in a "losers no longer managed by Jimmy Hart" match on December 26. The Grapplers won, leaving Cash and Graham without a manager.

Shortly thereafter, Graham broke his ankle which ended his career. Reprising the gimmick in Memphis, King Parsons was to take Graham's place but never showed up due to taking a contract with World Class Championship Wrestling. Mad Dog Boyd was pulled out of the parking lot and added to the team because Boyd fit the costume Parsons was meant to wear. Cash and Boyd initiated a feud with Eddie Gilbert by stealing a portrait of Gilbert that he had been showing off every week and offering to award to the winner of a draw.

== Championships and accomplishments ==
- Continental Wrestling Association
  - AWA Southern Tag Team Championship (2 times)
