= Rock 'n' Roll RPMs =

Professional wrestling tag team

Tag team
- Members: Tommy Lane; Mike Davis
- Name(s): The Rock 'n' Roll RPMs; The RPMs
- Billed heights: Davis: 6 ft 4 in (1.93 m); Lane: 6 ft 0 in (1.83 m)
- Billed from: Music City, USA
- Debut: 1985
- Disbanded: 1991

The Rock 'n' Roll RPMs were a professional wrestling tag team, consisting of Tommy Lane and Mike Davis, and later Kevin Dillinger (Allen Martin) that competed in several professional wrestling promotions throughout the Southern United States. They were known for their bright colored tights and hanging bandanas.

== History ==
The Rock 'n' Roll RPMs started in the World Class promotion, which at the time was still affiliated with the National Wrestling Alliance (NWA). They were known for their bright colored tights and hanging bandanas. The Rock 'n' Roll RPMs were glorified for their finishing move "The Spandex Splits". The move was later outlawed due to extensive neck injuries. They had feuds with several teams, including another "Rock 'n' Roll" tag team known as the Rock 'n' Roll Express. The Rock 'n' Roll RPMs went to World Wrestling Council in Puerto Rico and feuded with Ron & Chicky Starr over the WWC World Tag Team Championship. The RPMs feuded with The Fantastics over the WCWA Tag Team Championship, however they were unable to win the championship.

The RPMs also competed in the Continental Wrestling Association (CWA) in Memphis, where they won the American Wrestling Association (AWA)'s Southern Tag Team Championship twice. In 1988, they went across the state to Knoxville, wrestling for USA Championship Wrestling, where they won the USA Tag Team Championship once. Upon USA's closure that August, they returned to Memphis. Teaming with Cactus Jack, the Rock-n-Roll RPMs lost a match against Hector, Chavo, and Mando Guerrero at the only AWA pay-per-view SuperClash III. Their last match as a team was on December 25, 1988 in Nashville, losing to the team of Ricky Morton and Dutch Mantell. They would also take part in a battle royal the same night, which was won by Bill Dundee.

In 1989, Davis went to the Continental Wrestling Federation, while Lane retired. In 1990, Davis reformed the RPMs in the Dallas branch of the United States Wrestling Association with Kevin Dillinger, but had little success and the RPMs disbanded by 1991.

== Aftermath ==
Mike Davis formed another tag team with his brother Tom Davis known as the Dirty Davis Brothers. He died on December 25, 2001, from a massive heart attack in Granbury, Texas, at the age of 45.

Tommy Lane formed a tag team with "Big" Bobby Jones known as The NEW RPMs for Central All-Star Wrestling.

Kevin Dillinger would revert back to his real name, Allen Martin. He would continue to wrestle until 2005.

== Championships and accomplishments ==
- American Wrestling Association
  - AWA Southern Tag Team Championship (5 times)
- Championship Wrestling Association
  - CWA Tag Team Championship (1 time)
- USA Championship Wrestling
  - USA Tag Team Championship (1 time)
- World Wrestling Council
  - WWC Tag Team Championship (2 times)
