= Porkchop Cash =

American professional wrestler (born 1947)

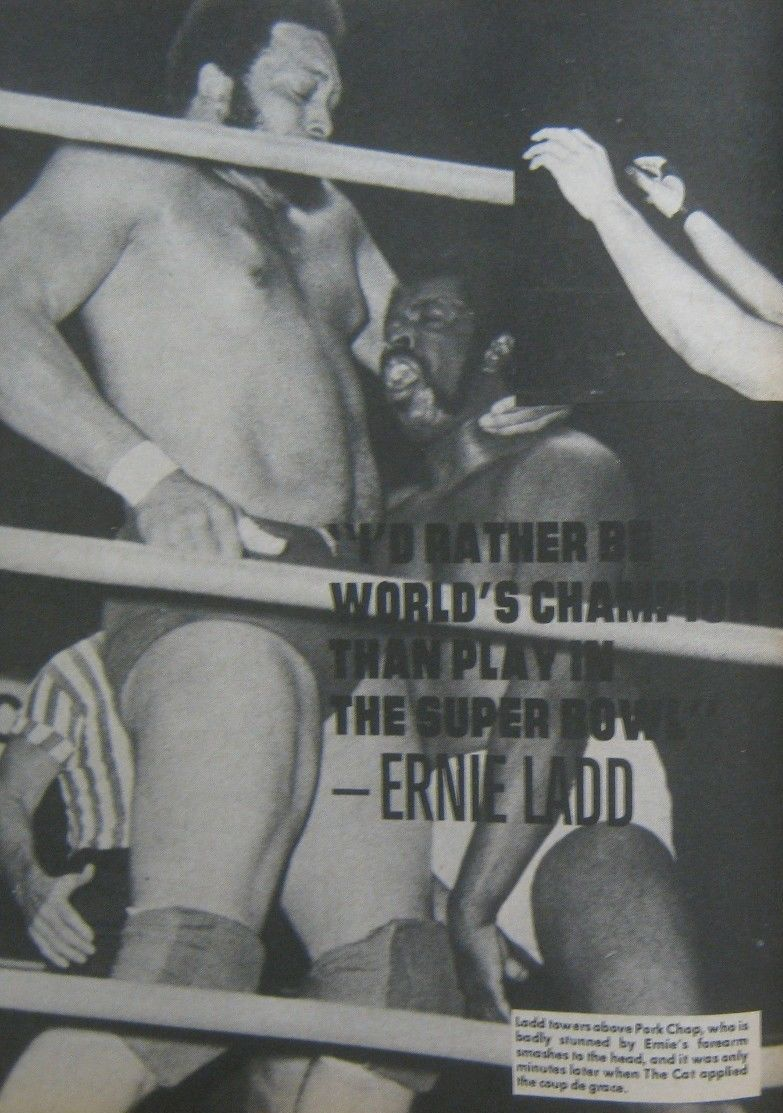
- Porkchop Cash (right) in a match against Ernie Ladd in 1975

Personal information
- Born: Bobby Cash; October 22, 1947 (age 79) Washington, D.C., U.S.

Professional wrestling career
- Ring name: Porkchop Cash
- Billed height: 6 ft 0 in (183 cm)
- Billed weight: 238 lb (108 kg)
- Debut: 1967
- Retired: 2001

Bobby Cash (born October 22, 1947) is an American retired professional wrestler better known by his ring name Porkchop Cash. He competed primarily in professional wrestling promotions aligned with the National Wrestling Alliance (NWA), including the Continental Wrestling Association and Georgia Championship Wrestling.

== Professional wrestling career ==
=== Championship Wrestling from Florida (1967–1968) ===
Cash made his wrestling debut in 1967, competing for the National Wrestling Alliance affiliated Championship Wrestling from Florida. He wrestled both as a singles competitor and in tag team matches with partner Frank Hester.

=== NWA Hollywood Wrestling (1968–1976) ===
The following year, he began wrestling for a Los Angeles, California-based territory known as NWA Hollywood Wrestling. He soon won the NWA Americas Heavyweight Championship by defeating John Tolos on March 22, 1974. After holding the belt for over two months, he dropped it to Black Gordman. In a rematch two weeks later, Cash regained the belt. Less than a month later, Ernie Ladd beat Cash to win the championship.

After losing the title, Cash formed a tag team with Manny Soto. Together, they defeated Black Gordman and Goliath to win the NWA Americas Tag Team Championship on July 24. The following month, Cash and Soto dropped the belts to the team of Angel Blanco and Dr. Wagner. Cash was involved in a feud with Butcher Brannigan, and he teamed with Victor Rivera to regain the NWA Americas Tag Team Championship on September 14 by defeating Brannigan and Man Mountain Mike. They held the belts until a loss to Otto Von Heller and Kurt Von Hess October 12. The following year, Cash teamed with S. D. Jones to win the belts for a third time. They won the belts from Jerry Brown and Buddy Roberts, collectively known as the Hollywood Blonds, but dropped the belts back to the Blonds the following month. Cash's final reign came in 1976, when he and Frank Monte defeated the team of Roddy Piper and Crusher Verdu for the belts. The reign was brief, however, as Cash and Monte soon dropped the belts to The Scorpions.

=== Southeastern United States ===
In 1976, Cash left California to compete in the Southeastern United States. Cash's first stop was Georgia, where he wrestled for Georgia Championship Wrestling. While there, he won the NWA Georgia Tag Team Championship by teaming with Tom Jones to defeat Jimmy and Johnny Valiant. The following month, Cash and Jones lost the title to Gene and Ole Anderson. Cash also wrestled for Tennessee-based NWA Mid-America. He teamed with Gorgeous George, Jr. to win the Mid-America version of the NWA Southern Tag Team Championship in February 1977.

In Louisiana, Cash became a two-time holder of the Tri-State version of the NWA United States Tag Team Championship. His first reign was with Mike George, as the team defeated The Medics (Billy Garrett and Jim Starr) on August 16, 1977. They held the belts for only a week, however, as they lost them in a rematch. Cash regained the belts in August 1977 from The Medics, this time with Dr. X as his partner. The team split up in September, however, and Cash and Dr. X faced each other for control of the title. Cash took Ray Candy as his partner, and Dr. X teamed with Ciclón Negro. Negro and Dr. X won the match, bringing Cash's title reign to an end.

=== NWA Tri-State ===
Cash returned to Louisiana in 1981, although NWA Tri-State had been purchased by new owners. Cash regained the tag team title, which had since been renamed the NWA Tri-State Tag Team Championship, by teaming with Doug Somers to defeat Eric Embry and Chief Frank Hill. Once again, Cash's title reign ended because of a split from his partner, as Cash and Somers went their separate ways later that year.

The following year saw Cash join Jim Crockett, Jr.'s Mid-Atlantic Championship Wrestling. Once again, he enjoyed success as a tag team competitor. Joining up with Jay Youngblood, he won the NWA Mid-Atlantic Tag Team Championship in March 1982. After dropping the belts to Don Kernodle and Pvt. Jim Nelson, Cash formed a team with Iceman King Parsons to regain the title. In August, however, Cash once again lost the championship to Kernodle and Nelson.

=== Continental Wrestling Association ===
After leaving the Mid-Atlantic territory, Porkchop Cash then joined Jerry Jarrett's Continental Wrestling Association based in Memphis, Tennessee. Cash soon formed a tag team with Troy Graham (who wrestled as "Dream Machine") known as The Bruise Brothers. Wrestling as heels, they held the AWA Southern Tag Team Championship twice. The Bruise Brothers were in the First Family stable of Jimmy Hart. Their main rivals were The Sheepherders, a tag team from New Zealand. They beat Dutch Mantel and Koko B. Ware for their first title on October 3, 1983. They also had a series matches with The Rock 'n' Roll Express, trading the AWA Southern Tag Team Championship with them. A notable moment in the feud came after their match on November 7, 1983. Cash and Graham lost the match and the belts and responded by attacking the referee, Paul Morton (father of Ricky Morton of The Rock 'n' Roll Express). The Bruise Brothers avenged their loss one week later by regaining the championship. On November 29, 1983, The Bruise Brothers dropped the belts to The Fabulous Ones. Tension built within Hart's stable, and The Bruise Brothers faced stablemates The Grapplers (Len Denton and Tony Anthony) in a "losers no longer managed by Jimmy Hart" match on December 26. The Grapplers won, leaving Cash and Graham without a manager. Shortly thereafter, Cash replaced Graham with Maddog Boyd. Cash and Boyd initiated a feud with Eddie Gilbert by stealing a portrait of Gilbert that he had been showing off every week and offering to award to the winner of a draw.

=== Southeastern Championship Wrestling ===
Cash next moved to Ron Fuller's Southeastern Championship Wrestling, which operated throughout Alabama and the eastern half of Tennessee. He won his first singles title since 1974 when he defeated Boris Zhukov for the NWA Alabama Heavyweight Championship in September 1984. He held the title for two months before dropping it to Lord Humongous (portrayed by Jeff Van Kamp). He also won the NWA Southeastern Heavyweight Championship with a victory over Jimmy Golden in January 1985. Two months later, he lost the belt to Boomer Lynch.

=== Central States Wrestling ===
After leaving Fuller's territory, Cash appeared next in Central States Wrestling in early 1987. He formed a team with Ken Timbs and challenged champions Rick McCord and Bart Batten for the NWA Central States Tag Team Championship. Cash and Timbs appeared to win the title on April 3, 1987, but the title was declared vacant because Cash used a foreign object to get the victory. In a rematch on April 10, Cash and Timbs defeated McCord and Batten again to win the championship officially. Timbs eventually left the promotion, and the titles were vacated once again.

Cash also briefly held the NWA Central States Heavyweight Championship after defeating Rufus R. Jones, but he lost the belt in a rematch one week later. He then returned to tag team competition, joining up with Ric McCord to win the NWA Central States Tag Team Championship once again. They defeated The Batten Twins (Brad and Bart) for the belts on November 9, 1987 but lost the title to the Montana Cowboys (Mike Stone and Rick Patterson) on November 26. While working for NWA Central States, Cash also worked as a manager, calling himself "The Boss" Porkchop Cash while assisting wrestlers Russell Sapp and "Krusher" Karl Kovac.

=== World Wrestling Federation (1988) ===
Cash worked as enhancement talent for WWF between July and October 1988.

=== Universal Championship Wrestling ===
Not long after his stint in the Central States area, Cash remained close to the area working for Bert Prentice's Universal Championship Wrestling out of Wichita, KS. He would enter the territory to begin a feud with his former Central States tag-team partner Ric McCord over McCord's recently won North American Heavyweight title. Porkchop would also feud with Rufus R. Jones and his nephew Boogaloo Jones, sometimes teaming up with fellow heel, and Dusty Rhodes lookalike Randy Rhodes. Porkchop would win the North American Championship from Ric McCord in November 1990, losing it back to McCord a few weeks later.

== Retirement ==
Several years later, Porkchop Cash came out of retirement to do a special three-way tag match with the Rock and Roll Express and the Midnight Express. His tag team partner was former rival Koko B. Ware, and the pair formed the PYT Express.

Porkchop Cash is now retired.

== Legacy ==
Floyd Womack of the National Football League's Seattle Seahawks received the nickname "Pork Chop Womack" from his mother because she thought that her son looked like Porkchop Cash.

== Championships and accomplishments ==
- Central States Wrestling
  - NWA Central States Heavyweight Championship (1 time)
  - NWA Central States Tag Team Championship (2 times) - with Ken Timbs (1) and Rick McCord (1)
- Georgia Championship Wrestling
  - NWA Georgia Tag Team Championship (1 time) - with Tom Jones
- International Championship Wrestling
  - ICW United States Heavyweight Championship (1 time)
  - ICW Mississippi Heavyweight Championship (1 time)
  - ICW Southern Tag Team Championship (2 times) – with King Cobra (1) and The Missouri Mauler (1)
- Mid-Atlantic Championship Wrestling
  - NWA Mid-Atlantic Tag Team Championship (2 times) - with Jay Youngblood (1) and Iceman King Parsons (1)
- Missouri Wrestling Federation / Midwest Wrestling Federation
  - MWF Tag Team Championship (1 time) - with Nemesis
- NWA Battlezone
  - NWA Mississippi Cruiserweight Championship (1 time)
- NWA Hollywood Wrestling
  - NWA Americas Heavyweight Championship (2 times)
  - NWA Americas Tag Team Championship (4 times) - with Manny Soto (1), Victor Rivera (1), S. D. Jones (1), and Frank Monte (1)
- NWA Mid-America - Continental Wrestling Association
  - NWA Southern Tag Team Championship (Mid-America version) (1 time) - with Gorgeous George, Jr.
  - AWA Southern Tag Team Championship (2 times) - with Dream Machine
- NWA Tri-State
  - NWA Tri-State Tag Team Championship (1 time) - with Doug Somers
  - NWA United States Tag Team Championship (Tri-State version) (2 time) - with Mike George (1) and Dr. X (1)
- Southeastern Championship Wrestling
  - NWA Alabama Heavyweight Championship (1 time)
  - NWA Southeastern Heavyweight Championship (Northern Division) (1 time)
