= Return to Grimpen Ward =

Remix album by Mentallo & The Fixer
- Released: February 13, 2001
- Genre: Electro-industrial
- Length: 73:41
- Label: Metropolis

Mentallo & The Fixer chronology
| Love Is the Law (2000) | Return to Grimpen Ward (2001) | Vengeance Is Mine (2001) |

Alternative cover
- 2018 remastered cover

Return to Grimpen Ward is the remix album by Mentallo & The Fixer, released on February 13, 2001 by Metropolis Records.

== Reception ==
Professional ratings
Review scores
| Source | Rating |
|---|---|
| AllMusic | 3/5 stars |

Tom Schulte of AllMusic gave Return to Grimpen Ward three out of five stars and called it "heavy, ominous beat music akin to Nine Inch Nails with a reach back to New Order" and "This gives their brand of industrial music a tough rock consciousness, especially in the drum programming." Industrial Reviews gave the album a negative review of two out of five stars and accused the remixes of not improving on and at times worsening the original compositions.

== Track listing ==
All tracks are written by Dwayne Dassing and Gary Dassing.

| No. | Title | Length |
|---|---|---|
| 1. | "Sacrilege" | 7:06 |
| 2. | "Legion of Lepers" | 3:46 |
| 3. | "Tachyo" | 5:27 |
| 4. | "Decomposed" | 6:29 |
| 5. | "Murderers Among Us" | 4:31 |
| 6. | "Ruthless" | 4:23 |
| 7. | "Goliath" | 2:41 |
| 8. | "Stellar Cascade" | 5:07 |
| 9. | "Atom Smasher" | 6:31 |
| 10. | "Scum of the Earth" | 5:13 |
| 11. | "Grim Reality" | 8:26 |
| 12. | "Narcotic Calling" | 4:23 |
| 13. | "False Prophets" | 6:02 |
| 14. | "Resonant Echo" | 3:35 |

== Personnel ==
Adapted from the Return to Grimpen Ward liner notes.

Mentallo & The Fixer

- Dwayne Dassing (as The Fixer) – electronics, synthesizer, sampler
- Gary Dassing (as Mentallo) – vocals, synthesizer, sampler

Production and design

- Daryl Litts – design, illustrations
- Damon Shelton – cover art

== Release history ==
| Region | Date | Label | Format | Catalog |
|---|---|---|---|---|
| United States | 2001 | Metropolis | CD | MET 198 |
| United States | 2015 | Metropolis | DL | MET 198 |
| Belgium | 2018 | Alfa Matrix | DL | AM3125DJ |
