= Zothera =

Compilation album by Mentallo & The Fixer
- Released: September 26, 2014
- Studio: The Slum (Austin, Texas)
- Genre: Electro-industrial
- Length: 222:45
- Label: Alfa Matrix

Mentallo & The Fixer chronology
4.4U (2012.11) (2012)	Zothera (2014)	Arrange the Molecule (2017)

Zothera is a compilation album by Mentallo & The Fixer, released on September 26, 2014, by Alfa Matrix. The collection comprises remastered audio of the band's first two albums for Zoth Ommog, 1993's Revelations 23 and Where Angels Fear to Tread, packaged with a third disc featuring previously unreleased remixes and versions. A free bonus compilation of eighteen tracks is also included, titled Sounds From the Matrix 015, featuring previously unreleased songs from then forthcoming releases for Alfa Matrix.

== Reception ==
Brutal Resonance gave Zothera a mixed to positive review of six out of ten and said "it's nice to see Alfa-Matrix catering to both fans of the old and new, and also reintroducing albums that may have never seen the light of day again if not for their dedication to the scene, but, overall, I'm crossed as to whether or not this box set is worth buying." Peek-A-Boo Magazine credited Revelations 23 and Where Angels Fear to Tread for not sounding dated and said "Apocrypha also reaches their high standards, with False prophets (shotgun messiah mix) being a favourite."

== Track listing ==
All tracks are written by Dwayne Dassing and Gary Dassing, except "Grim Reality" with lyrics co-written with Jon Pyre and "Natalia" with lyrics co-written with David Zamora Casas.

Disc one: Revelations 23
No.	Title	Length
1.	"Ancient Languagez"	6:48
2.	"Legion of Lepers"	9:14
3.	"Fusion Mutation"	6:44
4.	"Pulse Hemorrhage" (Lesionary Mix)	9:39
5.	"Rapid Suffocation"	5:52
6.	"Amplitude Interference"	7:37
7.	"Inhumanities"	4:59
8.	"Cerebral Statik Overdose"	4:28
9.	"Soaked With Blood" (T.H.C. Edit)	3:26
10.	"Grim Reality"	8:18
11.	"Scum of the Earth" (Bloody)	3:29
12.	"Bleek Seclusion"	1:16
13.	"Decomposed" (Grimpen Ward Mix)	4:21

Disc two: Where Angels Fear to Tread
No.	Title	Length
1.	"Gargantua"	2:31
2.	"Decomposed" (Trampled)	6:30
3.	"Sacrilege"	4:07
4.	"Bring to a Boil"	9:27
5.	"Virtually Hopeless"	4:43
6.	"Coward" (Submerged)	6:16
7.	"Ruthless"	5:39
8.	"Afterglow"	6:28
9.	"Battered States of Euphoria"	5:57
10.	"Abominations Unleashed"	4:45
11.	"Dead Days"	4:28
12.	"Atom Smasher"	6:17
13.	"Power Struggle"	2:48
14.	"Sacrilege" (Grimpen Ward)	5:45

Disc three: Apocrypha
No.	Title	Album (date)	Length
1.	"When Worlds Collide" (Wicked Radio Edit)	Matrix Downloaded [004] (1994)	6:06
2.	"Telepath"	No Rest for the Wicked (1992)	4:11
3.	"Doomsday Accelerator" (Los Alamos Mix)		3:04
4.	"Continuum"	Continuum (1995)	4:46
5.	"Rapid Suffocation" (Lesionary Mix)	Mentallo & The Fixer Meets Mainesthai (1994)	4:37
6.	"Sacrilege" (Angel of Death Mix)	Totentanz: The Best of Zoth Ommog (1994)	7:10
7.	"Battered States of Euphoria" (Acoustical)	Mentallo & The Fixer Meets Mainesthai (1994)	3:16
8.	"Power Struggle" (Tribulation)	Mentallo & The Fixer Meets Mainesthai (1994)	2:50
9.	"Natalia" (Cen-Tex Edit)		2:40
10.	"Murderers Among Us" (Grimpen Ward Radio Edit)	Matrix Downloaded [003] (1994)	4:07
11.	"Decomposed" (Return to Grimpen Ward)	Return to Grimpen Ward (2001)	6:27
12.	"Other World Technology" (Plutonium Trigger Mix)		5:28
13.	"Abandon All Hope" (Magi Mix)		4:17
14.	"Lightyear" (Cosmo Mix)		3:09
15.	"False Prophets" (Shotgun Messiah Mix)		4:35
16.	"Crypto-Anarchist" (Martyr Mix)		4:10

== Personnel ==
Adapted from the Zothera liner notes.

Mentallo & The Fixer

- Dwayne Dassing (as The Fixer) – programming (1.1, 1.10, 1.12, 2.3, 2.8, 2.12–2.14, 3.6, 3.8, 3.12–3.15), engineering (1.12, 2.2, 2.8, 2.12–2.13, 3.11), mixing (1.12, 2.8, 2.12–2.13), recording (2.8, 2.12–2.13), remixer (2.2, 3.11)
- Gary Dassing (as Mentallo) – programming (1.2–1.9, 1.11, 1.13, 2.1–2.7, 2.9–2.11, 2.14, 3.1–3.7, 3.9–3.11, 3.16), editing (3.1–3.9, 3.1–3.16), engineering (1.1–1.11, 1.13, 2.1–2.7, 2.9–2.11, 2.14, 3.1–3.10, 3.12–3.16), mixing (1.1–1.11, 1.13, 2.1–2.7, 2.9–2.11, 2.14, 3.10), recording (2.1–2.7, 2.9–2.11, 2.14), remastering (1.1–1.13, 2.1–2.14, 3.1–3.16), remixer (3.1–3.9, 3.11–3.6)

Additional performers

- Todd Kreth – guitar (3.16)

Production and design

- Tomoki Hayasaka – cover art

== Release history ==
Region	Date	Label	Format	Catalog
Germany	2014	Alfa Matrix	CD, DL	AM2210CD
