= ...There's No Air to Breathe =

Compilation album by Mentallo & The Fixer
- Released: May 19, 1997
- Recorded: 1990 – 1994
- Studio: Various: 6 Mile Slum; (San Antonio, Texas); The Slum; (Austin, Texas
- Genre: Electro-industrial
- Length: 70:57
- Label: Zoth Ommog
- Producer: Dwayne Dassing; Gary Dassing

Mentallo & The Fixer chronology
Auric Fires (1997)	...There's No Air to Breathe (1997)	Burnt Beyond Recognition (1997)

...There's No Air to Breathe is a compilation album by Mentallo & The Fixer, released on May 19, 1997, by Zoth Ommog Records. The album serves as a greatest hits collection for the band.

== Track listing ==
All tracks are written by Dwayne Dassing and Gary Dassing.

No.	Title	Album (date)	Length
1.	"Legion of Lepers"	Revelations 23 (1993)	9:16
2.	"Decomposed" (Trampled)	Where Angels Fear to Tread (1994)	6:36
3.	"Sacrilege" (Angel of Death Mix)	Where Angels Fear to Tread (1994)	7:06
4.	"Scum of the Earth" (Bloody)	Revelations 23 (1993)	3:30
5.	"Lunatik"	No Rest for the Wicked (1992)	4:17
6.	"Inhumanities"	Revelations 23 (1993)	4:57
7.	"Grim Reality"	Revelations 23 (1993)	8:13
8.	"Atom Smasher"	Where Angels Fear to Tread (1994)	6:21
9.	"Soaked With Blood"	Revelations 23 (1993)	3:19
10.	"Coward" (Submerged)	Where Angels Fear to Tread (1994)	6:20
11.	"When Worlds Collide"	No Rest for the Wicked (1992)	8:15
12.	"Power Struggle"	Where Angels Fear to Tread (1994)	2:47

== Personnel ==
Adapted from the ...There's No Air To Breathe liner notes.

Mentallo & The Fixer

- Dwayne Dassing (as The Fixer) – programming, producer
- Gary Dassing (as Mentallo) – vocals, programming, producer

Production and design

- Hartwerk – design

== Release history ==
Region	Date	Label	Format	Catalog
Germany	1997	Zoth Ommog	CD	ZOT 186
