= False Prophets =

False Prophets may refer to:

- False prophet, a Jewish, Christian, and Islamic concept
- False Prophets (band), an American punk rock band
- "False Prophets", a song by Mentallo and the Fixer from the 1997 album Burnt Beyond Recognition
  - False Prophets (EP) a 1997 EP by Mentallo and the Fixer
- "False Prophets" (song), a 2016 song by J. Cole

== See also ==
- Fake Prophet, a Chilean avant-garde metal band
- "False Prophet" (song), a 2020 song by Bob Dylan
