= Out to Lunch =

Out to Lunch may refer to:

- Out to Lunch!, a 1964 album by Eric Dolphy
- Out to Lunch (album), a 1994 album by Mainesthai
- Out to Lunch (TV program), a 1974 ABC special
- Out to Lunch (video game), a multi-platform action video game created by Mindscape
- "Out to Lunch", a poem in the Conductors of Chaos poetry anthology
- "Out To Lunch", a song by Krokus from The Blitz
- "Out to Lunch", a column by South African writer David Bullard

== See also ==
- "Along Comes Mary", a song by The Association which famously has the phrase in its chorus
