= Red Kross (EP) =

EP by Benestrophe
- Released: 1990
- Studio: Churchyard Studios (San Antonio, Texas)
- Genre: EBM

Benestrophe chronology
| Red Kross (1990) | Sensory Deprivation (1994) |

Mentallo & The Fixer chronology
| Red Kross (1990) | Wreckage + Ruin + & + Regrets + (Redemption) (1992) |

Red Kross is the debut EP of Benestrophe, self-released in 1990.

== Track listing ==
All tracks are written by Dwayne Dassing, Gary Dassing and Richard Mendez.

Side one
| No. | Title | Length |
|---|---|---|
| 1. | "Sensory Deprivation" |
| 2. | "Red Kross" |
| 3. | "Liberty City" (Edit) |

Side two
| No. | Title | Length |
|---|---|---|
| 1. | "Churchyard" |
| 2. | "Downed Cow" (Crystal Methane Mix) |
| 3. | "L.S.D." (Edit) |

== Personnel ==
Adapted from the Red Kross liner notes.

Benestrophe

- Dwayne Dassing – programming, engineering, mixing, mastering
- Gary Dassing – programming, engineering, mixing, mastering
- Richard Mendez – vocals
