= Commandments for the Molecular Age =

EP by Mentallo & The Fixer
- Released: May 30, 2006
- Studio: Grimpen Ward Studios
- Genre: Electro-industrial
- Length: 53:45
- Label: Alfa Matrix
- Producer: Gary Dassing

Mentallo & The Fixer chronology
| Vengeance Is Mine (2001) | Commandments for the Molecular Age (2006) | Enlightenment Through a Chemical Catalyst (2007) |

Alternative cover
- Radio edition cover

Commandments for the Molecular Age is an EP by Mentallo & The Fixer, released on May 30, 2006, by Alfa Matrix.

== Reception ==
Marc Tater of Chain D.L.K. commended Gary Dassing's compositional technique. Similarly Industrial Reviews awarded the album three out of five stars praised Dassing's multi-layered industrial music compositions and complex programming. Terrorverlag commended the band for remaining energetic and danceable and said the longform tracks were worth the listeners time to engage with.

== Track listing ==
All tracks are written by Gary Dassing.

| No. | Title | Length |
|---|---|---|
| 1. | "Brute Force Uploading" (Mescalero Mix) | 7:50 |
| 2. | "Brief But Violent Illness" (Puking, Blackouts and Pain) | 13:16 |
| 3. | "My Fondest Drug Related Memory" (Chimora Mix) | 5:58 |
| 4. | "Commandments for the Molecular Age" (Critical Mass of Enlightenment Mix) | 13:46 |
| 5. | "Opening the Bandwidth for the Cosmic Signal" (Fine-Tuning and Frequency) | 12:55 |

Radio edition track listing
| No. | Title | Length |
|---|---|---|
| 1. | "Brute Force Uploading" (Mescalero Radio Edit) | 5:37 |
| 2. | "Brief But Violent Illness" (Radio Blackout Re-Edit) | 5:24 |
| 3. | "Commandments for the Molecular Age" (Critical Mass Radio Broadcast Edit) | 5:31 |
| 4. | "Opening the Bandwidth for the Cosmic Signal" (AM Frequencies Radio Edit) | 3:54 |

== Personnel ==
Adapted from the Commandments for the Molecular Age liner notes.

Mentallo & The Fixer

- Gary Dassing (as Mentallo) – vocals, programming, producer, engineering, mixing, cover art, photography

Additional performers

- John Bustamante – additional vocals (1)
- Dwayne Dassing (as The Fixer) – mastering, editing

Production and design

- Benoît Blanchart – design

== Release history ==
| Region | Date | Label | Format | Catalog |
|---|---|---|---|---|
| Belgium | 2006 | Alfa Matrix | CD, DL | am1075epcd |
| Belgium | 2006 | Alfa Matrix | CD, DL | am1020 DJ |
| Belgium | 2015 | Alfa Matrix | DL | |
