= Sensory Deprivation (album) =

Studio album by Benestrophe
- Released: 1994
- Recorded: 1989 – 1990
- Genre: EBM
- Length: 75:55
- Label: Ras Dva

Benestrophe chronology
Red Kross (1990)	Sensory Deprivation (1994)	Auric Fires (1997)

Mentallo & The Fixer chronology
Revelations 23 (1993)	Sensory Deprivation (1994)	Where Angels Fear to Tread (1994)

Alternative cover°
- 2018 reissue cover

Sensory Deprivation is the debut studio album of Benestrophe, released in 1994 by Ras Dva Records.

== Reception ==
Sonic Boom gave Sensory Deprivation a positive review and said "most modern electronic bands tend to use nonsensical lyrics but Benestrophe has a definite issue which it is trying to pass along to it's [sic] listeners and that message is one shared by other artists in this genre; vivisection must be stopped." Industrialnation similarly gave a positive review of the release, calling it "12 tracks of good solid industrial music."

== Track listing ==
All lyrics are written by Richard Mendez, except "Flesh Decay" by Gary Dassing; all music is composed by Dwayne Dassing, Gary Dassing and Richard Mendez.

No.	Title	Length
1.	"Pig Butcher"	7:50
2.	"P.S.Y."	5:45
3.	"Sensory Deprivation"	7:16
4.	"Endangered Species"	5:27
5.	"Flesh Decay"	5:57
6.	"Dog Lab"	6:48
7.	"Di Bomber"	6:19
8.	"Conscience Bind"	6:07
9.	"Ritual"	5:45
10.	"Red Kross"	7:00
11.	"Church Yard"	4:57
12.	"Downed Cow"	6:44

2008 digital issue bonus tracks
No.	Title	Length
13.	"Lesser of 2 Evils"	5:18
14.	"Incantations"	1:15

== Personnel ==
Adapted from the Sensory Deprivation liner notes.

Mentallo & The Fixer

- Dwayne Dassing – programming, recording, engineering, mixing
- Gary Dassing – programming, recording, engineering, mixing, cover art, illustrations
- Richard Mendez – vocals

Production and design

- Ric Laciak – cover art, illustrations
- Chris Spoonts – remastering

== Release history ==
Region	Date	Label	Format	Catalog
United States	1994	Ras Dva	CD	12CD01
United States	2008	Ras Dva	DL	
Belgium	2018	Alfa Matrix	DL	AM3257DJ
