= Systematik Ruin =

EP by Mentallo & The Fixer
- Released: January 12, 1999
- Studio: Various: Proxima Base; Scott Leever; Austin, Texas
- Genre: Electro-industrial
- Length: 66:14
- Label: Metropolis

Mentallo & The Fixer chronology
False Prophets (1997)	Systematik Ruin (1999)	Algorythum (1999)

Systematik Ruin is an EP by Mentallo & The Fixer, released on January 12, 1999, by Metropolis Records. It contained remixes and previously unreleased songs from the Algorythum recording sessions. It represented the band's first album without founding member Dwayne Dassing, who left the band in 1998.

== Reception ==
Professional ratings
Review scores
Source	Rating
AllMusic	2.5/5 stars

AllMusic gave Systematik Ruin two and a half out of five possible stars.

== Track listing ==
All tracks are written by Gary Dassing.

No.	Title	Length
1.	"Systematik Ruin" (Remix)	5:47
2.	"Carbon Based" (Last Days Remix)	8:23
3.	"Intro, Systematik Ruin"	12:43
4.	"Inner Peace" (Remix)	4:32
5.	"Carbon Based" (Ambient)	7:26
6.	"Systematik Ruin" (Trance Tone Dub)	5:36
7.	"Michael"	13:15
8.	"Carbon Based" (Trance Tone Dub)	3:44
9.	"Inner Peace"	4:48

== Personnel ==
Adapted from the Systematik Ruin liner notes.

Mentallo & The Fixer

- Gary Dassing (as Mentallo) – vocals, synthesizer, sampler, effects, tape, electric guitar, acoustic guitar, drum programming, sequencing, programming, mastering, recording, engineering, remixer

Additional musicians

- John Bustamante – backing vocals (1, 3, 4, 6, 9), vocals (2, 5, 7, 8)
- Chris Cline – live drums and recording (1–3, 5, 6, 8)

Production and design

- Carlos Rosales – cover art, design

== Release history ==
Region	Date	Label	Format	Catalog
United States	1999	Metropolis	CD	MET 118
Germany	1999	Off Beat	CD	O-132, SPV 060-49083
