= A Collection of Rare, Unreleased & Remastered =

Compilation album by Mentallo & The Fixer Benestrophe, Mainesthai, Polyhedron
- Released: April 27, 2012
- Studio: Various: The Churchyard; (San Antonio, Texas); Proxima Base; (San Antonio, Texas); The Slum; (Austin, Texas)
- Genre: Electro-industrial
- Length: 266:32
- Label: Alfa Matrix
- Producer: Gary Dassing

Mentallo & The Fixer chronology
Enlightenment Through a Chemical Catalyst (2007)	A Collection of Rare, Unreleased & Remastered (2012)	Music From the Eather (2012)

Benestrophe chronology
Auric Fires (1997)	A Collection of Rare, Unreleased & Remastered (2012)	Turner's All Night Drugstore (2018)

Mainesthai chronology
Meets Mainesthai (1994)	A Collection of Rare, Unreleased & Remastered (2012)

A Collection of Rare, Unreleased & Remastered is the compilation album by Mentallo & The Fixer, released on April 27, 2012, by Alfa Matrix.

== Reception ==
In reviewing A Collection of Rare, Unreleased & Remastered, Peter Marks of Brutal Resonance criticized the music for not aging well but acknowledged that he preferred the albums Mentallo & The Fixer produced after Dwayne Dassing departed from the band. Lollipop Magazine stated "Texan electro-industrial act Mentallo & The Fixer has been at it for a while, and that knowledge shows on the lean, effective "decomposed (spent)." Peek-A-Boo Magazine criticized the collection for being excessive, saying "slimming it down to three or even two cd's would have been possible, maybe even with a few free downloads of remixes/reworked songs."

== Track listing ==
All tracks are written by Dwayne Dassing and Gary Dassing, except where noted.

Disc one: Until the Blood Flows Freely
No.	Title	Lyrics	Music	Artist	Length
1.	"Battered States of Euphoria" (Medina Mix)			Mentallo & The Fixer	6:48
2.	"Decomposed" (Original Mix)			Mentallo & The Fixer	4:24
3.	"Pulse Hemorrhage" (Abrasive)			Mentallo & The Fixer	7:21
4.	"Ancient Languagez" (Lingua)	Dwayne Dassing; Gary Dassing	Dwayne Dassing; Gary Dassing	Mentallo & The Fixer	6:43
5.	"Altered States of Euphoria"			Mentallo & The Fixer	3:43
6.	"Legion of Lepers" (Lesionary Mix)			Mentallo & The Fixer	9:17
7.	"Scum of the Earth" (Bloody)			Mentallo & The Fixer	3:28
8.	"Natalia, Texas 1989" (Zamora Mix)			Mentallo & The Fixer	1:17
9.	"Grim Reality" (Blister Mix)	D. Dassing; G. Dassing	D. Dassing; G. Dassing	Mentallo & The Fixer	6:50
10.	"Inhumanities"			Mentallo & The Fixer	4:57
11.	"Decomposed" (Trampled)			Mentallo & The Fixer	6:31
12.	"Mother of Harlots" (Ghetto Crusher Edit)			Mentallo & The Fixer	5:31
13.	"Atom Smasher/Euphoria Finale"	D. Dassing; G. Dassing	D. Dassing; G. Dassing	Mentallo & The Fixer	7:00

Disc two: Inner Sanctum
No.	Title	Artist	Length
1.	"Legion of Lepers" (Sacrificial)	Mentallo & The Fixer	6:01
2.	"Pulse Hemorrhage" (Aggro Instrumental)	Mentallo & The Fixer	4:17
3.	"Sacrilege" (Benediction Mix)	Mentallo & The Fixer	5:55
4.	"Murderers Among Us" (Bloody Knuckles instrumental)	Mentallo & The Fixer	6:46
5.	"Grounded"	Mentallo & The Fixer	12:32
6.	"Legion of Lepers" (Deep Kick)	Mentallo & The Fixer	1:53
7.	"Decomposed" (Spent)	Mentallo & The Fixer	2:19
8.	"Sacrilege (For Generations to Come)"	Mentallo & The Fixer	3:36
9.	"Radiant 1"	Mentallo & The Fixer	8:03
10.	"Introduction: To the Last Days of the System"	Mentallo & The Fixer	5:02
11.	"Proximo" (Coronal Mass)	Mentallo & The Fixer	3:22
12.	"Unearthed Monolithic"	Mentallo & The Fixer	1:51
13.	"Choice Flaw/Tantric Awareness"	Mentallo & The Fixer	3:29
14.	"Inner Peace" (Can You Feel Sunlight)	Mentallo & The Fixer	1:47
15.	"Inner Peace" (Bouncin' Off the Moon)	Mentallo & The Fixer	0:58

Disc three: Nostalgia Deluxe 1
No.	Title	Lyrics	Music	Artist	Length
1.	"Benelux"	Jon Pyre; Gary Dassing	Gary Dassing	Polyhedron	3:40
2.	"Benelux" (Benediction Mix)	Pyre; G. Dassing	G. Dassing	Polyhedron	4:48
3.	"Melancholy"	Pyre; G. Dassing	G. Dassing	Polyhedron	4:04
4.	"Disrupture" (Vortex Radio Edit)	G. Dassing	G. Dassing	Mentallo & The Fixer	3:31
5.	"Narcotik Calling" (Deathwish)	G. Dassing	G. Dassing	Mentallo & The Fixer	3:05
6.	"My Animocity"	G. Dassing; Michael Greene	G. Dassing	Mainesthai	5:15
7.	"Wartime"	G. Dassing; Greene	G. Dassing	Mainesthai	5:16
8.	"Wartime" (Trampled)	G. Dassing; Greene	G. Dassing	Mainesthai	5:07
9.	"Exit" (Killjoy Mix)	G. Dassing; Greene	G. Dassing	Mainesthai	6:59
10.	"Lightyear" (Mentallo Mix)	G. Dassing	G. Dassing	Mentallo & The Fixer	5:35
11.	"No Sleep Tonight" (Milo Mix)	G. Dassing; Richard Mendez	G. Dassing	Benestrophe	4:30
12.	"Michael" (Re-Edit)	Larry Penn; G. Dassing	G. Dassing	Mentallo & The Fixer	9:16
13.	"Cherished and Suppressed"	Pyre; G. Dassing	G. Dassing	Mentallo & The Fixer	12:16

Disc four: Incantations
No.	Title	Lyrics	Music	Artist	Length
1.	"Flesh Decay"			Benestrophe	6:02
2.	"Churchyard"	Gary Dassing; Richard Mendez	G. Dassing	Benestrophe	4:59
3.	"PSY"	G. Dassing; Mendez		Benestrophe	5:52
4.	"DCO"	G. Dassing; Mendez		Benestrophe	5:03
5.	"Ritual"	G. Dassing; Mendez		Benestrophe	5:57
6.	"Doglab"	G. Dassing; Mendez		Benestrophe	6:42
7.	"Kopkiller"	G. Dassing; Mendez		Benestrophe	5:26
8.	"HIV Test Positive"	G. Dassing; Mendez		Benestrophe	6:23
9.	"Pig Butcher"	G. Dassing; Mendez		Benestrophe	7:03
10.	"D.I. Bomber"	G. Dassing; Mendez		Benestrophe	6:18
11.	"Planets"	G. Dassing; Mendez		Benestrophe	5:49
12.	"Shall Not Want"	G. Dassing; Mendez		Benestrophe	5:55

== Personnel ==
Adapted from the A Collection of Rare, Unreleased & Remastered liner notes.

Mentallo & The Fixer

- Dwayne Dassing (as The Fixer) – programming (1–4, 1–9, 1–13, 2–3, 3–9, 2–8, 4–4 to 4–5, 4–7, 4–10 to 4–11), remixer (2.7, 2.8, 3.7), recording (2.7, 2.8, 3.13), mixing (1.11, 1.13)
- Gary Dassing (as Mentallo) – programming (1.1–1.13, 2.1–2.7, 2.9–2.15, 3.1–3.8, 3.10–3.15, 4.1–4.3, 4.5–4.9, 4.12), mixing (1.1–1.10, 1.12, 2.1-2-15, 3.1–3.13, 4.1–4.3, 4.6, 4.8, 4.9, 4.12), engineering (1.1 to 1.13, 2.1 to 2.15, 3.1 to 3.13), recording (1.1–1.13, 2.1–2.6, 2.9, 2.10–2.15, 3.1–3.13), remastering (2.1–2.15, 3.1–3.13), editing (2.1–2.15, 3.1–3.13), vocals (3–4 to 3–5, 3–10, 3–14 to 3–15), remixer (2.8)

Additional performers

- John Bustamante – vocals (3.12)
- Michael Greene – vocals (3.6–3.9)
- Richard Mendez – instruments (4.1–4.12), vocals (3.11, 4.1–4.12)
- Larry Penn – vocals (3.13)
- Jon Pyre – vocals (3.1–3.3)

== Release history ==
Region	Date	Label	Format	Catalog
Belgium	2012	Alfa Matrix	CD, DL	AM1175FCD
Germany	2012	Emmo.biz	LP	EZR 002
