= Mentallo & The Fixer Meets Mainesthai =

Remix album by Mentallo & The Fixer and Mainesthai
- Released: 1994
- Studio: The Slum (Austin, Texas)
- Genre: Electro-industrial
- Length: 56:02
- Label: Zoth Ommog
- Producer: Dwayne Dassing; Gary Dassing; Michael Greene

Mentallo & The Fixer chronology
Where Angels Fear to Tread (1994)	Meets Mainesthai (1994)	Continuum (1995)

Mainesthai chronology
Out to Lunch (1994)	Meets Mainesthai (1994)	A Collection of Rare, Unreleased & Remastered (2012)

Alternative cover
- 1998 remaster cover

Mentallo & The Fixer Meets Mainesthai is a collaborative remix album by Mentallo & The Fixer and Mainesthai, released in 1994 by Zoth Ommog Records.

== Music ==
The band originally sent the recording sessions that comprised Mentallo & The Fixer Meets Mainesthai to Zoth Ommog as a work in progress and the album was released early before it could meet the band's approval. On June 23, 1998, the album was re-released by Metropolis Records in remastered form with an alternate track listing that replaces several of the songs on the original issue.

== Reception ==
In their review of Mentallo & The Fixer Meets Mainesthai, Ink 19 commended the remixes for improving the originals and commented that the album would be a good introduction to Mentallo & The Fixer for new listeners. Sonic Boom gave the album a positive review and noting the standouts as being the "Basket Case remix of 'Wartime' with its brutal cadence and the Tribulation mix of 'Power Struggle' with all of its Demon Seed samples."

== Track listing ==
No.	Title	Writer(s)	Length
1.	"Rapid Suffocation" (Lesionary Mix)	Dwayne Dassing; Gary Dassing	6:21
2.	"Black Illusion" (Immaculate)	Dassing; Dassing	5:15
3.	"Grim Reality" (Malnourished)	Dassing; Dassing	7:43
4.	"Battered States of Euphoria" (Acoustical)	Dassing; Dassing	3:19
5.	"Wartime" (Basket Case)	Dassing; Dassing; Michael Greene	4:58
6.	"Spectral" (Angel of Death Mix)	Dassing; Dassing; Greene	4:20
7.	"Powerstruggle" (Tribulation)	Dassing; Dassing	2:47
8.	"Therapy" (Molestation Mix)	Dassing; Dassing; Greene	6:17
9.	"Exit" (Lesionary Mix)	Dassing; Dassing; Greene	9:26
22.	"Silence"		1:09
23.	"Silence"		3:27

Notes
- Tracks 10–21 consist of five seconds of silence each.

1998 remaster track listing
No.	Title	Writer(s)	Length
1.	"Rapid Suffocation" (Lesionary Mix)	Gary Dassing	6:22
2.	"Decomposed" (Grimpen Ward)	Gary Dassing	4:29
3.	"Bleek Seclusion" (Immaculation)	Dwayne Dassing	5:16
4.	"Sacrilege" (Angel of Death Mix)	Dwayne Dassing; Gary Dassing	7:12
5.	"Grim Reality" (Malnourished)	Dwayne Dassing	7:46
6.	"Battered States of Euphoria" (Acoustical)	Gary Dassing	3:20
7.	"Wartime" (The Basket Case Mix)	Dwayne Dassing; Michael Greene	5:00
8.	"Spectral" (Angel of Death Mix)	Dwayne Dassing	4:21
9.	"Powerstruggle" (Tribulation)	Dwayne Dassing	2:48
10.	"Therapy" (session)	Dwayne Dassing	1:08
11.	"Therapy" (Molestation Mix)	Michael Greene	15:46
12.	"Y" (Mama's Crazy Kitchen Mix)	Dwayne Dassing; Gary Dassing; Michael Greene	7:02
13.	"Exit" (Stage Left)	Dwayne Dassing; Gary Dassing; Michael Greene	5:13

== Personnel ==
Adapted from the Mentallo & The Fixer Meets Mainesthai liner notes.

Musicians

- Dwayne Dassing (as The Fixer) – programming, producer, engineering and mixing
- Gary Dassing (as Mentallo) – programming, producer, engineering and mixing
- Michael Greene – vocals, producer, engineering and mixing (5, 6, 8, 9)

Production and design

- Ric Laciak – recording (23)
- André Menge (as Menge Design Group) – cover art
- Chris Spoonts – mastering

== Release history ==
Region	Date	Label	Format	Catalog
Germany	1994	Zoth Ommog	CD	ZOT 119
United States	1998	Metropolis	CD	MET 088
