= Mentallo and the Fixer =

Project name of Gary and Dwayne Dassing's electro-industrial music project

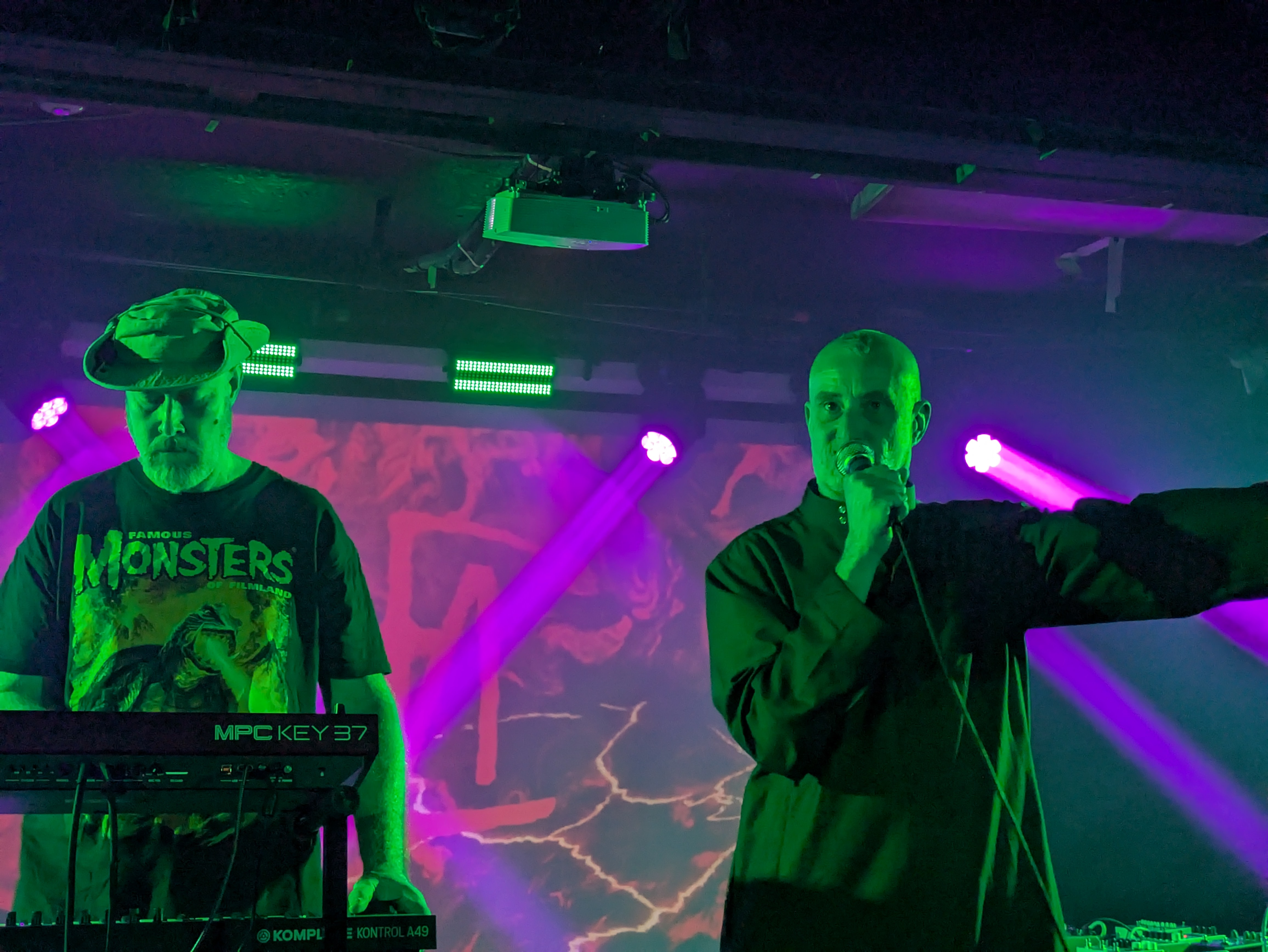
- Dwayne Dassing (l) and Gary Dassing (r)

Background information
- Origin: Texas, United States
- Genres: Industrial, electro-industrial
- Years active: 1988–present
- Labels: Simbiose; Zoth Ommog; Metropolis Records; Off Beat; Alfa Matrix
- Spinoffs: Mainesthai; Parking Lot in Drug Form; Shimri; Reign of Roses; Kitty Kosmonaut
- Spinoff of: Benestrophe
- Members: Gary Dassing: Dwayne Dassing

Mentallo and the Fixer (sometimes written as Mentallo & The Fixer) is the project name used by American electro-industrial musicians Gary Dassing (Mentallo) and Dwayne Dassing (The Fixer) from 1988 to 1999, and by Gary Dassing alone from 1999 to the present day. The band has several releases on the American record label, Metropolis Records. They are named after two Marvel Comics characters.

== Biography ==
The Dassing brothers first began experimenting with music by the means of more traditional rock music instruments, such as guitar and drums. However, by the time the two formed their first band Benestrophe with vocalist Richard Mendez, the instruments of choice became synthesizers and samplers. Most of the two tapes worth of material they recorded subsequently became available as the releases Sensory Deprivation and Auric Fires on Ras Dva Records.

Benestrophe dissolved due to competing obligations, with Mendez pursuing school and Dwayne Dassing moving to Austin, TX, for job prospects, leaving Gary Dassing in San Antonio to record tracks on his own. Gary produced demo tapes for friends in San Antonio, one of which passed through a DJ in California who subsequently passed it on to a fanzine named Technology Works. The zine published a review of the demo along with Gary's address, initiating a stream of requests for music that pushed Gary into formalizing a new project. The two brothers reunited in Austin and began work as Mentallo & The Fixer. A friend of Gary's brought the name "Mentallo & The Fixer" to his attention while still working on Benestrophe. After Benestrophe went dormant, the name resurfaced and, after Gary realized the names referred to two lesser-known comic book characters, the name grew on him. Influences on the project included the Cars, Orchestral Manoeuvres in the Dark and Gary Numan.

Their first album release No Rest for the Wicked saw a limited 500-copy run on vinyl and a CD by the Portuguese label Simbiose records, and also gained the attention of Talla 2XLC from Zoth Ommog records. Zoth Ommog released their next two major albums, Revelations 23 and Where Angels Fear to Tread. As an American band, working with European labels proved difficult and frustrating due to poor communications and, in the case of the Simbiose releases, a lack of a formal contract.

Mentallo & The Fixer soon after began their long-term relationship with the American industrial music record label Metropolis Records with a domestic re-release of their second and third albums as well as a CD of unreleased back catalog material, Continuum.

Meanwhile, in 1994, the Dassing brothers formed a side project with vocalist Michael Greene called Mainesthai. Mainesthai's two releases, Out to Lunch and Mentallo & The Fixer Meets Mainesthai were also both released on Metropolis Records, but not until 1998. Michael also participated in Mentallo's first U.S. tour in 1996, joining the band to perform Mainesthai tracks during their live sets.

In 1997 Mentallo & The Fixer toured the U.S. for the second time, Europe for the first time, and released their next album Burnt Beyond Recognition, along with two EPs, Centuries and False Prophets. The band's second US tour was initially cut short due to difficulties because of the long duration and because show revenue was unexpectedly low, but the missed tour dates were rescheduled after a break. The European tour in October that year proved to be a much better experience for the band.

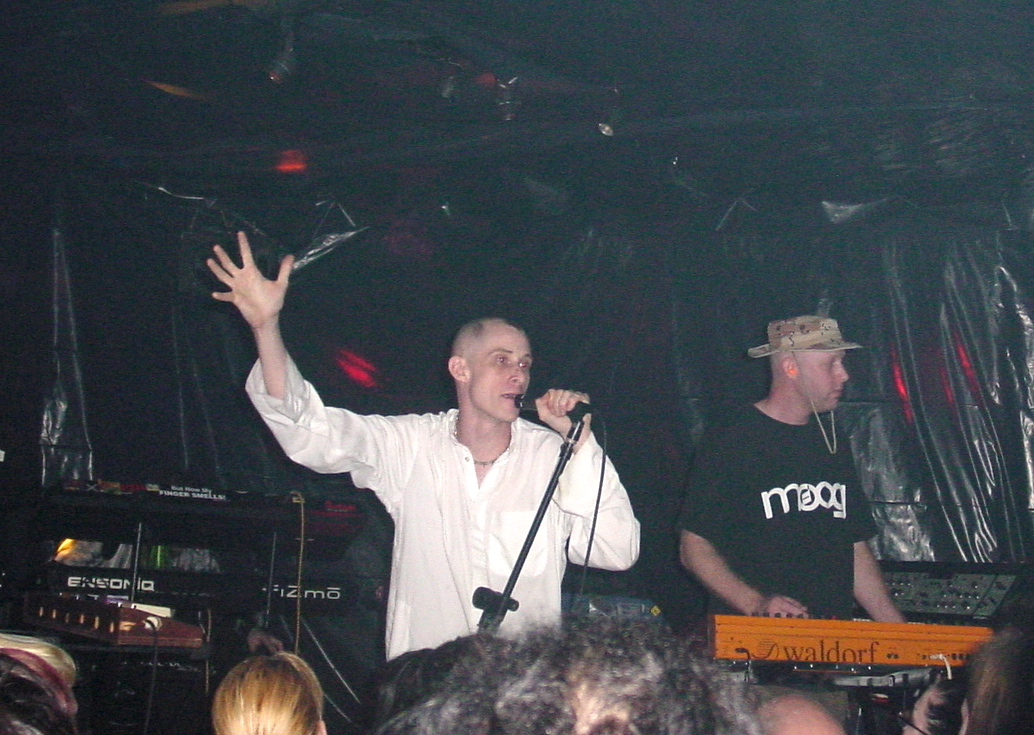
Mentallo and the Fixer play in Dallas, TX, in 2002

By 1999, Dwayne and Gary agreed to split in order to pursue their own musical directions. After the departure of Dwayne from the band (aside from some live show support), Gary continued to use the Mentallo & The Fixer name and released several albums including Algorythum, Love Is the Law, Return to Grimpen Ward, and Vengeance is Mine, along with the EP Systematik Ruin to accompany Alogrythum.

After "Grimpen", Mentallo's album output slowed somewhat, resulting in two albums: Enlightenment Through a Chemical Catalyst in 2007, and Music From the Eather in 2012, both released by Alfa Matrix.

In September 2014, Mentallo & The Fixer released a 3 CD box titled Zothera on Alfa Matrix. It contained two remastered albums from their Zoth Ommog era, namely Revelations 23 and Where Angels Fear to Tread, and a third bonus CD Apocrypha with unreleased material including remixes.

Another intervening period of dormancy followed, compelled by the crash of Gary's music computer, which he took as a sign to give music a break for a while. After a several year break and a new Apple computer, Gary found the motivation to revive works in progress from data backups and record a new album, Arrange The Molecule, released by Alfa Matrix in 2017.

Updates posted to the band's official Facebook page in 2019 showed Gary in the studio, joined by brother Dwayne and occasional collaborator Jon (Jonni) Pyre, working on new material for an as yet unnamed project. The apparent inspiration for this live performance-only project is Tangerine Dream's first live recording from 1975, Ricochet.

In 2022, Re:Mission Entertainment released a 30th anniversary edition of No Rest for the Wicked digitally, with a follow up limited vinyl release. The digital reissue included four additional tracks taken from the 1991 GPC Productions cassette release Wreckage + Ruin + & + Regrests + [Redemption].

In 2025, the band announced a US tour with dates on the West coast – the first live dates for the band after almost 20 years and with Dwayne rejoining Gary for the effort. The band is also scheduled to play Coldwaves 13 in Chicago in September 2025.

== Discography ==
=== Main discography ===
Studio albums

- .5 Honkey/Wreckage + Ruin + & + Regrets + (Redemption) (1991, GPC Productions)
- No Rest for the Wicked (1992, Simbiose)
- Revelations 23 (1993, Zoth Ommog)
- Where Angels Fear to Tread (1994, Zoth Ommog)
- Burnt Beyond Recognition (1997, Metropolis)
- Algorythum (1999, Metropolis)
- Love Is the Law (2000, Metropolis)
- Vengeance Is Mine (2001, Metropolis)
- Enlightenment Through a Chemical Catalyst (2007, Metropolis)
- Music From the Eather (2012, Alfa Matrix)
- Arrange the Molecule (2017, Alfa Matrix)

Remix albums

- Mentallo & The Fixer Meets Mainesthai (1994, Zoth Ommog)
- Continuum (1995, Metropolis)
- Return to Grimpen Ward (2001, Metropolis)

Extended plays

- Centuries (1997, Metropolis)
- False Prophets (1997, Metropolis)
- Systematik Ruin (1999, Metropolis)
- Commandments for the Molecular Age (2006, Alfa Matrix)
- 4.4U (2012.11) (2012, Alfa Matrix)

Compilation albums

- ...There's No Air to Breathe (1997, Zoth Ommog)
- A Collection of Rare, Unreleased & Remastered (2012, Alfa Matrix)
- Zothera (2014, Alfa Matrix)

=== Compilation appearances ===
- Cybernetic Biodread Transmission – LP side B track #1/CD track #5 "Brutal Rapture" (1992) Simbiose
- The Cyberflesh Conspiracy – CD track #2 (1992) If It Moves...
- We Came To Dance - Indie Dancefloor Vol. II" – CD track #11 "Decomposed" (1993) Sub Terranean
- Zoth in Your Mind – CD track #1 "Sacrilege (Angel of Death Mix)" (1993) Zoth Ommog
- Moonraker – 2xCD disc #1 track #3 "Grim Reality" (1994) Sub Terranean
- The Colours of Zoth Ommog – CD track #2 "Grim Reality (Grimpen Ward Remix)" (1994) Zoth Ommog
- Totentanz - The Best of Zoth Ommog – 2xCD disc #2 track #1 "Sacrilege (Angel of Death Mix)" and track #2 "Rapid Suffocation" (1994) Zoth Ommog
- We Came to Dance Vol. V – CD track #6 "Legion of Lepers (Grimpen Ward Remix)" (1994) Sub Terranean
- Electricity Vol. 6 – CD track #4 "Battered States of Euphoria" (1995) Ausfahrt
- Moonraker Vol. II – 2xCD disc #2 track #3 "Sacrilege (Grimpen Ward Mix)" (1995) Sub Terranean
- The Tyranny Off the Beat Vol. II – CD track #11 "Murderers Among Us (B.K. Mix)" (1995) Off Beat
- There Is No Time – 4xCD disc #1 track #2 "Decomposed (Grimpen Ward Mix)" (1995) Ras Dva
- The Tyranny Off the Beat Vol. III – CD track #6 "Peril" (1996) Off Beat
- Neurostyle Vol. III – CD track #2 "Goliath" (1997) Sub Terranean
- Reticence – CS side B track #6 "Psylocybin" (1997) SDS Productions
- Something For Your Mind – CD track #1 "Legion of Lepers (Grimpen Ward Remix)" (1997) Zoth Ommog
- The Tyranny Off the Beat Vol. IV – 2xCD disc #1 track #2 "Goliath" (1997) Off Beat
- Apocalypse Now Vol. 2 – 2xCD disc #1 track #14 "Brutal Rupture (Re-Mix)" (1998) Sub Terranean
- Electronic Lust V.1 – 2xCD disc #1 track #10 "Narcosis" (1998) Orkus
- Electropolis: Volume 1 – CD track #5 "Vision" (1998) Metropolis
- The Tyranny Off the Beat Vol. V – 2xCD disc #2 track #3 "Mother of Harlots (Tempo Chrusher)" (1998) Off Beat
- Metropolis 1999 – CD track #14 "Scum of the Earth" (1999) Metropolis
- Music Research Promotional CD MIDEM '99 Alternative – 2xCD disc #1 track #4 "When Worlds Collide" (1999) Music Research
- The Complete History of Zoth Ommog: Totentanz – 4xCD disc #2 track #1 "Sacrilege (Angel of Death Mix)" and track #2 "Rapid Suffocation" (1999) Cleopatra
- Electropolis: Volume 2 – CD track #2 "Murderers Among Us (Exclusive Mix)" (2000) Metropolis
- Music Research/Alternative – CD track #4 "When Worlds Collide" (2000) Zoth Ommog
- A Tribute to the Prodigy – CD track #8 "Jericho" (2002) Hypnotic/Anagram Records
- Your Future Is My Past – CD track #12 "Goliath (Remix)" (2004) Machinist Records
- Electro/R/Evolution Volume 1 – CD track #4 "Signaljammer (Unreleased Demo)" (2005) Static Sky Records
- Endzeit Bunkertracks [Act II] – 4xCD Ltd. Edition Box Set disc #2 track #6 "Driving Off a Cliff With a Cult (An Old Friend Nearly Killed Me Mix)" (2006) Alfa Matrix
- Matri-X-Trax (Chapter 2) – CD Promo track #7 "Brute Force Uploading (Mescalero Radio Edit)", track #8 "Opening The Bandwidth for the Cosmic Signal (AM Frequencies Radio Edit)", and track #9 "Brief But Violent Illness (Radio Blackout Re-edit)" (2006) Alfa Matrix
- Mew Signs & Sounds 07-08/06 – CD Enhanced track #7 "Brute Force Uploading (Mescalero Radio Edit)" (2006) Zillo
- Re:Connected [2.0] – 2xCD Box Set disc #2 track #2 "Brute Force Uploading (Mescalero Radio Edit)" (2006) Alfa Matrix
- Sonic Seducer Cold Hands Seduction Vol. 63 – CD + CD Enhanced disc #2 track #11 "Brute Force Uploading (Mescalero Radio Edit)" (2006) Sonic Seducer
- Sounds from the Matrix 003 – CD Promo track #1 "Signaljammer" (2006) Alfa Matrix
- Sounds from the Matrix 004 – CD Promo track #16 "First Flower After The Flood (Trichocereus Mix)" (2006) Alfa Matrix
- Sonic Seducer Cold Hands Seduction Vol. 67 – CD + CD Enhanced disc #1 track #2 "Outside The Pharmacies of Fairyland (Short Cut)" (2007) Sonic Seducer
- Sounds from the Matrix 05 – CD Promo track #15 "First Flower After the Flood (Short-Cut Edit)" (2007) Alfa Matrix
- The Giant Minutes to the Dawn – 3xCD + DVD Box Set disc #3 track #15 "First Flower After the Flood (Short-Cut Edit)" Alfa Matrix

== Side projects ==
=== Benestrophe ===
Benestrophe began after Gary Dassing and Rich Mendez met in their senior year of high school in San Antonio, TX. Their first song - "Pig Butcher" - was recorded in the Summer of 1988. Gary and Dwayne composed the music and Rich wrote the lyrics and provided vocals. Benestrophe went idle in 1990 as the Dassing brothers moved to Austin, TX, but reactivated for a time after 1995 with new material and re-releases on RAS DVA records.

- Sensory Deprivation – Cassette, Self-released
- Red Kross – Cassette (1990) Self-released
- Sensory Deprivation – CD Ltd. Edition (1994) Ras Dva
- Auric Fires – CD (1997) Ras Dva
- CD Sound Compilation Vol. 1 – V/A CD track #14 "Sensory Deprivation" (1994) IndustrialnatioN Magazine
- There Is No Time – V/A 4xCD disc #2 track #1 "Shall Not Want (Unreleased Track)" (1995) Ras Dva
- Dora Blue - The Ras Dva Fanbase Compilation – CD track #8 "Dog Lab (An Early Morning Remix), track #10 "D.C.O.", track #12 "Sleep Tonight (Remix)" (1996) Ras Dva
- Awake the Machines - On the Line Vol. 2 – 2xCD disc #1 track #6 "Lesser of 2 Evils" (1997) Out of Line/Sub/Mission Records
- Binary Application Extension 04 – CD track #15 "Sister Mary's Sleep" (1997) Genocide Project
- Turner's All Night Drugstore (Rare & Unreleased 1987-1997) – Digital (2018) Alfa Matrix

=== Mainesthai ===
Mainesthai was a short-term collaboration between the Dassing brothers and Mike Greene. Gary answered an ad that Mike had put in a local paper which led to an interview and one-song demo performance that led to a formal collaboration. As was the case with Benestrophe, Gary and Dwayne produced the music and Mike contributed the lyrics and vocals. Mainesthai's sound was similar to Mentallo, but the subject matter was explicitly more political in nature and the music was made with an effort to sound more melodic and, in their words, "tribal".

- Out to Lunch - CD (1994) Zoth Ommog Records
- Mentallo & The Fixer Meets Mainesthai – CD (1994) Zoth Ommog Records • CD (1998) Metropolis Records
- Body Rapture Vol. 4 – V/A CD track #2 "Dollars and Sins" (1994) Zoth Ommog Records
- We Came to Dance - Indie Dancefloor Vol. VI – V/A CD track #10 "Exit (Stage Left)" (1994) Sub Terranean
- There Is No Time – V/A 4xCD disc #2 track #9 "Y (Mama's Crazy Kitchen Mix)" (1995) Ras Dva

=== Parking Lot in Drug Form ===
Gary Dassing and Ric Laciak briefly collaborated while Ric stayed with Gary during a two-week visit to Austin, TX.

- There Is No Time – V/A 4xCD disc #4 track #15 "Step Away" (1995) Ras Dva
- AP: The Contest – V/A CD track #14 "So Cold" (1995) Zoth Ommog Records

=== Shimri ===
Gary Dassing solo project.

- Lilies of the Field – CD (2000) Artoffact Records

=== Reign of Roses ===
Dwayne Dassing with vocals and lyrics by Scott Berens Drum programming on some tracks by Gary Dassing. The project released on EP in 2006 and resurfaced in 2024 for their first full-length release.

- In Bourbon and in Blood – CDr (2006) Self-released
- Thorns - CD, Digital (2024) Re:Mission Entertainment

=== Kitty Kosmonaut ===
Dwayne Dassing with John Bustamante of Fektion Fekler.

- Kitty Kosmonaut - CD, Digital (2015) Re:Mission Entertainment; Cass (2022) Single Speed Tapes
