= Vengeance Is Mine (Mentallo & The Fixer album) =

Studio album by Mentallo & The Fixer
- Released: July 10, 2001
- Studio: Proxima Studio (Kathmandu, Nepal)
- Genre: Electro-industrial
- Length: 71:56
- Label: Metropolis
- Producer: Dwayne Dassing; Gary Dassing

Mentallo & The Fixer chronology
Return to Grimpen Ward (2001)	Vengeance Is Mine (2001)	Commandments for the Molecular Age (2006)

Vengeance Is Mine is the eighth studio album by Mentallo & The Fixer, released on July 10, 2001 by Metropolis Records.

== Reception ==
Professional ratings
Review scores
Source	Rating
AllMusic	3/5 stars
Rock Sound	3.5/5 stars

Theo Kavadias of AllMusic gave Vengeance Is Mine three out of five stars, noting the music for lacking direction while crediting it for "introduc[ing] a darker, dirtier electronic sound, both detailed and cluttered" that "conceals gems, and what initially may sound like too much going on actually reveals hidden harmonies, noises, and progressions." Industrial Reviews awarded the album a three out of five, commending the band for embracing more of a dance club oriented sound but criticizing their lack of energy.

== Track listing ==
All lyrics are written by Gary Dassing, except "All That Your Soul Desires" by Jon Pyre and "Cherished & Suppressed" by Larry Penn; all music is composed by Gary Dassing.

No.	Title	Length
1.	"Palestine"	6:16
2.	"The Way of All Flesh"	6:51
3.	"Death on Delicate Wings"	7:43
4.	"Outside Are the Dogs..."	5:04
5.	"Like a Carcass Trodden Down"	6:35
6.	"Shining One"	6:29
7.	"Good for Nothing"	6:22
8.	"Judgement Executed (In the Low Pain of Decision)"	6:12
9.	"All That Your Soul Desires"	7:13
10.	"Cherished & Suppressed"	12:16
11.	"Untitled"	0:57

== Personnel ==
Adapted from the Vengeance Is Mine liner notes.

Mentallo & The Fixer

- Dwayne Dassing (as The Fixer) – vocals, programming, producer, engineering, mixing

Additional performers

- Larry Penn – spoken word (10)

Production and design

- Dwayne Dassing (as The Fixer) – producer, engineering, mixing, editing, mastering
- Rev. Daryl Litts – design, illustrations, photography

== Release history ==
Region	Date	Label	Format	Catalog
United States	2001	Metropolis	CD, DL	MET 211
