= Turner's All Night Drugstore (Rare & Unreleased 1987–1997) =

Compilation album by Benestrophe
- Released: October 26, 2018
- Genre: EBM
- Length: 73:21
- Label: Alfa Matrix

Benestrophe chronology
A Collection of Rare, Unreleased & Remastered (2012)	Turner's All Night Drugstore (Rare & Unreleased 1987–1997) (2018)

Mentallo & The Fixer chronology
Arrange the Molecule (2017)	Turner's All Night Drugstore (2018)

Turner's All Night Drugstore (Rare & Unreleased 1987–1997) is a compilation album by Benestrophe, released on October 26, 2018 by Alfa Matrix.

== Reception ==
Side-Line magazine awarded Turner's All Night Drugstore (Rare & Unreleased 1987–1997) a seven out of ten and described Benestrophe's music as "dark and sophisticated".

== Track listing ==
All tracks are written by Dwayne Dassing, Gary Dassing and Richard Mendez.

No.	Title	Length
1.	"Say You Wish" (Early Morning Demo)	4:48
2.	"Gatewood" (Live at Club Oasis)	4:06
3.	"Shall Not Want (There Is No Time)"	6:48
4.	"Sleep Tonight" (8741 Club Mix)	4:29
5.	"Don't Deny It"	10:49
6.	"Phazez"	3:48
7.	"DCO (Dora Blue)"	5:05
8.	"Pig Butcher (Hogwild)"	3:28
9.	"Sister Mary's Sleep"	4:12
10.	"Ritual (Chinese Graveyeard)"	5:32
11.	"D.I. Bomber" (Kelly Field Mix)	6:13
12.	"Ritual (Paranormal)"	6:49
13.	"Sleep Tonight"	7:14

== Personnel ==
Adapted from the Turner's All Night Drugstore (Rare & Unreleased 1987–1997) liner notes.

- Gary Dassing – compiling

== Release history ==
Region	Date	Label	Format	Catalog
Belgium	2018	Alfa Matrix	DL	AM3258DJ
