= Music From the Eather =

Music from the Eather

Studio album by Mentallo & The Fixer
- Released: October 26, 2012
- Recorded: Amplified Intuitive State / Deep Eddy, Austin, Texas
- Genre: Electro-Industrial
- Length: 147:12
- Label: Alfa Matrix
- Producer: Gary Dassing

Mentallo & The Fixer chronology
A Collection of Rare, Unreleased & Remastered (2012)	Music from the Eather (2012)	4.4U (2012.11) (2012)

Music from the Eather is the ninth studio album by Mentallo & The Fixer, released on October 26, 2012 by Alfa Matrix. The album was released as a two CD standard version and a limited edition box set containing an additional third CD, a sticker, a postcard and a poster.

== Background ==
The album keeps "the theme developed on the last conceptual Enlightenment Through a Chemical Catalyst album, dealing with higher or altered states of consciousness-experiences Gary Dassing has personally gone through." "I just wanted to work on music that would stimulate my ears. I wanted to do things that would trip me out!", explains Dassing. The warning on the album cover Be cautious using this substance refers to this theme. Music from the Eather completely avoids vocals. However, voice and other samples are frequently used. Several tracks are remixes or appear to be reworks of songs of the same album and of Enlightenment Through a Chemical Catalyst. The track Opening the Bandwidth for the Cosmic Signal was first released as a reworked version on the EP Commandments for the Molecular Age.

== Critical reception ==
Professional ratings
Review scores
Source	Rating
Brutal Resonance	Mixed
I Die: You Die	Favorable
Santa Sangre	Favorable
Side-Line	8/10

Critics noted the experimental nature of Music from the Eather. Music magazine I Die: You Die wrote, "With Music From The Eather Dassing has, in a way, progressed into crafting the industrial equivalent of fusion jazz." The album's "complexity has reached an untouchable degree of perfection", wrote music magazine Side Line. Amy Nekrotique of Brutal Resonance described Music from the Eather as "absolutely exhausting to listen to". "You really have to be a fan of Mentallo And The Fixer to fully enjoy this album", concludes Side Line.

== Track listing ==
All tracks are written by Gary W. Dassing.

Disc one: Good News and Warnings
No.	Title	Length
1.	"Disturbing the Priest"	2:06
2.	"Metaphysical Agents"	10:16
3.	"Warrior Within"	4:38
4.	"Prelude to a Plateshift"	5:32
5.	"Holywar in My Head"	1:41
6.	"Untapped Regions"	8:04
7.	"Watching the Stars Fall"	3:29
8.	"Shadow of My Former Self"	7:43
9.	"Penicillin for the Soul"	5:07
10.	"Wandering off in the Dark"	12:11
11.	"Becoming the Candle Light (Defining Moment)"	6:45
12.	"Sensory Illusion Destroyed"	3:16
13.	"First Flower"	2:40
Total length:		73:33

Disc 2: Altered Everything Forever
No.	Title	Length
1.	"Riding the Razors Edge"	3:49
2.	"Perma Fried"	3:47
3.	"Sensory Illusion Destroyed (Equivica Mix)"	3:50
4.	"Shaking, Seizures and Aftereffects"	2:12
5.	"Frankenstein Molecule"	2:23
6.	"Chakras and Studdering"	3:11
7.	"Beginning of the End"	5:08
8.	"Perma Fried (Tantric Mix)"	3:31
9.	"Occult Genetic Code"	3:55
10.	"Amigdula Sharp Bender"	1:20
11.	"Shadow of My Former Self (Ego Shredder)"	10:36
12.	"Complete Loss of Reality"	2:35
13.	"Clarity of Perception"	4:43
14.	"Shortcut to Self Harm"	3:55
15.	"Dark Perceptions Unfolding"	7:00
16.	"Everything Went Wrong"	2:44
17.	"My Night Under the Crushing Mattress"	3:09
18.	"Untapped Regions (A New Alloy Blooms in the Crucible)"	5:42
Total length:		73:39

Disc three: The Golden Thread Which Binds Them
No.	Title	Length
1.	"Riding the Razors Edge (Empty Vial)"	1:10
2.	"Complete Loss of Reality (Mescalito Mix)"	3:01
3.	"Beginning of the End (Etheric Mix)"	4:34
4.	"Spanning the Bandwidth"	3:59
5.	"Tektonik Plates"	5:29
6.	"Opening the Bandwidth for the Cosmic Signal"	5:18
7.	"Solar Flower"	5:33
8.	"Wonderful World of Nausea"	7:26
9.	"Warrior Within (Etheric Mix)"	2:19
10.	"Complete Loss of Reality (Candyflip)"	8:15
11.	"Tactile Mayhem"	2:31
12.	"Holywar in My Head (Hyperaware)"	2:02
13.	"Riding the Razors Edge (Datura Blackout)"	5:20
14.	"Brief but Violent Illness (Silent Curandero)"	5:39
15.	"Untapped Regions (Loops and Illusions)"	5:45
16.	"Shortcut to Self Harm (4AM Fire Alarm)"	4:55
Total length:		73:20

== Personnel ==
Adapted from the Arrange the Molecule liner notes.

Mentallo & The Fixer

- Gary Dassing (as Mentallo) – programming, arrangements, producer

Production and design

- Gary Dassing (as Mentallo) – musical assistance
- Oliver Haecker – Cover art, illustrations, design

== Release history ==
Region	Date	Label	Format	Catalog
Belgium	2012	Alfa Matrix	CD, DL	AM1186DCD
Belgium	2015	Alfa Matrix	DL	AM 2186DJ
