= Auric Fires =

Studio album by Benestrophe
- Released: 1997
- Genre: EBM
- Length: 71:01
- Label: Ras Dva

Benestrophe chronology
| Sensory Deprivation (1994) | Auric Fires (1997) | A Collection of Rare, Unreleased & Remastered (2012) |

Mentallo & The Fixer chronology
| Centuries (1997) | Auric Fires (1997) | ...There's No Air to Breathe (1997) |

Alternative cover
- 2018 reissue cover

Auric Fires is the second studio album by Benestrophe, released in 1997 by Ras Dva Records.

== Reception ==
Industrial Reviews gave Auric Fires four stars out of five and praised the melody and density of the compositions, as well as the band's ability to stand out in the EBM and industrial music scenes. Sonic Boom severely criticized Richard Mendez's vocal performances and said "luckily, Gary Dassing contributes vocals to 'Base of Brutality' and there are a handful of instrumental tracks on the album to keep it becoming a dismal failure."

== Track listing ==
All lyrics are written by Richard Mendez, except "Base of Brutality" by Gary Dassing; all music is composed by Dwayne Dassing, Gary Dassing and Richard Mendez.

| No. | Title | Length |
|---|---|---|
| 1. | "Future Tense" | 4:42 |
| 2. | "Hypocrite" | 6:20 |
| 3. | "Base of Brutality" | 3:29 |
| 4. | "H.I.V. (Test Positive)" | 6:21 |
| 5. | "Planets" | 5:29 |
| 6. | "Disbelief (The Quest)" | 6:51 |
| 7. | "Phobia" | 4:55 |
| 8. | "Auric Fires" | 5:49 |
| 9. | "Sleep Tonight" (Remix) | 8:37 |
| 10. | "Britches (A.L.F)" | 3:43 |
| 11. | "Farewell My Love" | 6:49 |
| 12. | "Farewell" | 4:08 |
| 13. | "L.S.D." | 2:05 |
| 14. | "Liberty City" | 1:44 |

2008 digital issue bonus tracks
| No. | Title | Length |
|---|---|---|
| 15. | "D.C.O." | 5:06 |
| 16. | "Sleep Tonight" (Remix) | 7:14 |
| 17. | "Dog Lab" (An Early Morning Remix) | 6:43 |
| 18. | "Sister Mary's Sleep" | 4:14 |
| 19. | "Rich Mendez Interview" | 0:52 |
| 20. | "Dwayne Dassing Interview" | 0:33 |
| 21. | "Gary Dassing Interview" | 0:58 |

== Accolades ==
| Year | Publication | Country | Accolade | Rank |
|---|---|---|---|---|
| 1996 | CMJ New Music Monthly | United States | "Top 25 Dance" | 20 |
"*" denotes an unordered list.

== Personnel ==
Adapted from the Auric Fires liner notes.

Mentallo & The Fixer

- Dwayne Dassing – programming, sequencing, effects, tape, recording, engineering
- Gary Dassing – programming, sequencing, recording, engineering
- Richard Mendez – vocals

Production and design

- Angela H. Brown – photography
- Ric Laciak – mastering, cover art, illustrations, design

== Release history ==
| Region | Date | Label | Format | Catalog |
|---|---|---|---|---|
| United States | 1994 | Ras Dva | CD | 12CD09 |
| United States | 2008 | Ras Dva | DL | |
| Belgium | 2018 | Alfa Matrix | DL | AM3258DJ |
