= 4.4U (2012.11) =

4.4U [2012.11]

EP by Metroland/Aesthetische/ Mentallo & The Fixer/Daniel B. Prothése
- Released: November 6, 2012
- Genres: EBM; electro-industrial
- Length: 19:02
- Label: Alfa Matrix

Mentallo & The Fixer chronology
Music From the Eather (2012)	4.4U [2012.11] (2012)	Zothera (2014)

4.4U [2012.11] is a split EP by Aesthetische, Daniel B. Prothése, Mentallo & The Fixer and Metroland, released on November 6, 2012, by Alfa Matrix. It is part of the compilation series that Alfa Matrix issues, with the theme of this particular release being 1990s EBM and experimental music.

== Reception ==
Brutal Resonance wrote a positive review for 4.4U [2012.11], recommending the EP to listeners of Front 242 and Nitzer Ebb and praising the tracks' ability to complement each other and while remaining disparate from one another.

== Track listing ==
No.	Title	Artist	Length
1.	"Theme for Metroland" (Mix for Brussels)	Metroland	5:40
2.	"Blausäure"	Aesthetische	4:13
3.	"Gammera" (Equinox)	Mentallo & The Fixer	4:25
4.	"Ssymme3"	Daniel B. Prothése	4:44

== Personnel ==
Adapted from the 4.4U [2012.11] liner notes.

== Release history ==
Region	Date	Label	Format	Catalog
Germany	2012	Alfa Matrix	DL	AM 3058DJ
