= Love Is the Law (Mentallo & The Fixer album) =

Studio album by Mentallo & The Fixer
- Released: April 18, 2000
- Studio: Various: Proxima Base; The Slum; (Austin, Texas
- Genre: Electro-industrial
- Length: 73:49
- Label: Metropolis
- Producer: Gary Dassing

Mentallo & The Fixer chronology
Algorythum (1999)	Love Is the Law (2000)	Return to Grimpen Ward (2001)

Love Is the Law is the sixth studio album by Mentallo & The Fixer, released on April 18, 2000 by Metropolis Records.

== Reception ==
Mattias Huss of Release Magazine gave Love Is the Law a mixed review, saying "Gary's work is fumbling about uncertainly, turning over some interesting stones but never really stopping to look under them" and "no track really makes a mark in this unwholesome wholeness, but promise is hiding in there."

== Track listing ==
All tracks are written by Gary Dassing.

No.	Title	Length
1.	"United Nations"	8:57
2.	"Vessel"	4:11
3.	"Like Eather"	5:03
4.	"Novacaine"	2:06
5.	"Exit"	4:33
6.	"The Thousand Points of Light"	3:15
7.	"Murderers Among Us"	6:27
8.	"Lawless"	4:47
9.	"Subjection"	7:03
10.	"Zealot"	3:45
11.	"Truth Be Told"	4:27
12.	"Lawgiver"	8:05
13.	"Consequential"	3:26
14.	"Love Is the Law"	7:44

== Personnel ==
Adapted from the Love Is the Law liner notes.

Mentallo & The Fixer

- Gary Dassing (as Mentallo) – programming, producer, engineering, mixing

Additional musicians

- Robert Bustamante – recording, engineering, mixing and drum programming (11)
- Michael Greene – vocals (5)
- Todd Kreth – guitar

Production and design

- Dwayne Dassing – mastering
- Daryl Litts – design

== Release history ==
Region	Date	Label	Format	Catalog
United States	2000	Metropolis	CD, DL	MET 154
