= Enlightenment Through a Chemical Catalyst =

Studio album by Mentallo & The Fixer
- Released: January 19, 2007
- Genre: Industrial; EBM
- Length: 73:32
- Label: Alfa Matrix
- Producer: Gary Dassing

Mentallo & The Fixer chronology
| Commandments for the Molecular Age (2006) | Enlightenment Through a Chemical Catalyst (2007) | A Collection of Rare, Unreleased & Remastered (2012) |

Alternative cover
- Box set cover

Enlightenment Through a Chemical Catalyst is the eighth studio album by Mentallo & The Fixer, released on January 19, 2007 by Alfa Matrix.

== Reception ==
Marc Tater of Chain D.L.K. awarded Enlightenment Through a Chemical Catalyst four out of five stars and praised the album for "presenting the very own multi-layered and complex style Gary likes to create and is known for." Release Magazine gave the album eight out of ten, called the band "the sound of things to come" and said "oscillations run wildly through aural fields littered with rich textures and arrpegiations which begin and end in chaotically irrational patterns." I Die:You Die found the album to be a "mixed success", criticizing it's incoherence while saying "it's never boring certainly, and has some truly fantastic passages." Industrial Reviews gave the album three stars out of five and praised the dense complexity of the writing but noted that the melodic verve that former member Dwayne Dassing brought to the band's compositions is missing from the album. Terrorverlag commended the psychedelic and brutal composition structures and commented that the band rarely becomes dull.

== Track listing ==
All tracks are written by Gary Dassing.

| No. | Title | Length |
|---|---|---|
| 1. | "Once Upon a Time" | 2:57 |
| 2. | "Outside the Pharmacies of Fairyland" | 10:52 |
| 3. | "Amigdula" | 14:16 |
| 4. | "Very Sudden Onset of Incoherence" | 10:59 |
| 5. | "Brute Force Uploading" | 5:45 |
| 6. | "Coming Apart Perfectly" | 4:43 |
| 7. | "Felt So Good That I Cried" | 7:14 |
| 8. | "First Flower After the Flood" | 10:32 |
| 9. | "Commandments for the Molecular Age" | 6:14 |

Disc two
| No. | Title | Length |
|---|---|---|
| 1. | "Brute Force Uploading" (Intravascular Terror) | 10:08 |
| 2. | "Coming Apart Perfectly" (Psychoactive Cacti) | 13:54 |
| 3. | "Brief But Violent Illness" (Tripping Over the Bleeding Edge) | 13:12 |
| 4. | "Commandments for the Molecular Age" (Sacramental) | 8:34 |
| 5. | "Russian Roulette With a Research Chemical" (Waking to the Sound of a Blood Pressure Cuff) | 17:04 |

== Personnel ==
Adapted from the Enlightenment Through a Chemical Catalyst liner notes.

Mentallo & The Fixer

- Gary Dassing (as Mentallo) – vocals, programming, producer, engineering, mixing, cover art, illustrations, photography

Additional performers

- John Bustamante – additional vocals (5)

Production and design

- Benoît Blanchart – design
- Dwayne Dassing (as The Fixer) – mastering, editing

== Release history ==
| Region | Date | Label | Format | Catalog |
|---|---|---|---|---|
| Belgium | 2007 | Alfa Matrix | CD, DL | am1076cd |
| Belgium | 2007 | Alfa Matrix | CD, DL | AM-2076-DCD |
| Belgium | 2014 | Alfa Matrix | DL | |
