= Arrange the Molecule =

Studio album by Mentallo & The Fixer
- Released: October 13, 2017
- Studio: Eatherplex
- Genre: Electro-industrial
- Length: 135:27
- Label: Alfa Matrix

Mentallo & The Fixer chronology
Zothera (2004)	Arrange the Molecule (2017)	Turner's All Night Drugstore (2018)

Arrange the Molecule is the tenth studio album by Mentallo & The Fixer, released on October 13, 2017 by Alfa Matrix.

== Reception ==
In reviewing Arrange the Molecule, ReGen praised Mentallo & The Fixer for "bypassing the group's prior sounds for something more experimental with complicated programming and an absence of song structure." Terrorverlag praised the compositions for comprising an array of sounds that defy description and compared the band favorably Skinny Puppy, Download and Uwe Schmidt.

== Track listing ==
All tracks are written by Gary Dassing.

Disc one
No.	Title	Length
1.	"Just What I Had Been Missing"	5:16
2.	"The Moment You Realize..."	5:24
3.	"Fire Flies and the Full Moon Sky"	7:12
4.	"Bad Trip on a Broken Heart"	4:19
5.	"Gammera"	8:00
6.	"Methodical Damage"	3:50
7.	"Miracle in the Medicine Cabinet"	5:42
8.	"The Moment U Realize" (Nite Version)	4:28
9.	"A Lot Like the Truth"	4:24
10.	"Neutrons Firing"	4:21
11.	"Giving In, Life Limb"	3:25
12.	"Treat It Like a Loaded Gun"	8:02
13.	"Bad Friend"	2:53

Disc two
No.	Title	Length
1.	"Eather Mix" (Remix Medly)	6:37
2.	"Shadow of My Former Self" (7" Akira Mix)	3:45
3.	"Complete Loss of Reality" (Schizo Mix)	4:55
4.	"Russian Roulette With a Research Chemical"	6:00
5.	"Prisoner in My Own Bathroom"	5:31
6.	"The Moment You Realize/Silent Takeover"	6:46
7.	"Metaphysical Agents" (Chrysalis Mix)	6:14
8.	"Metaphysical Agents" (Antigen)	4:41
9.	"Beautiful Goodbye"	2:28
10.	"Stickman in the Static"	2:41
11.	"Bad Trip on a Broken Heart" (Extended Remix)	5:46
12.	"Miracle in the Medicine Cabinet 2"	5:13
13.	"Gammera" (Nite Version)	3:14
14.	"Bad Friend" (4-20 Thug Version)	4:20

== Personnel ==
Adapted from the Arrange the Molecule liner notes.

Mentallo & The Fixer

- Gary Dassing (as Mentallo) – programming, engineering, mixing, mastering, illustrations

Production and design

- Benoît Blanchart – design

== Release history ==
Region	Date	Label	Format	Catalog
Belgium	2017	Alfa Matrix	CD, DL	AM-2251-DCD
