= False Prophets (EP) =

EP by Mentallo & The Fixer
- Released: October 14, 1997
- Studio: The Slum (Austin, Texas)
- Genre: Industrial
- Length: 26:59
- Label: Metropolis

Mentallo & The Fixer chronology
Burnt Beyond Recognition (1997)	False Prophets (1997)	Systematik Ruin (1999)

False Prophets is an EP by Mentallo & The Fixer, released on October 14, 1997, by Metropolis Records. It contains remixes of the tracks "False Prophets" and "Mother of Harlots", which previously appeared on the band's fourth studio album Burnt Beyond Recognition, as well as previously unreleased track titled "Deluge 2370 B.C.E."

== Reception ==
Sonic Boom recommended False Prophets to "die-hard Mentallo fans, as well as club oriented DJ's, will want to pick up a copy of this single, while the rest of you are should pick up the full length album instead."

== Track listing ==
All tracks are written by Dwayne Dassing and Gary Dassing.

No.	Title	Remixer(s)	Length
1.	"False Prophets" (Full Frontal Lobotomy Mix)	Dwayne Dassing; James Mendez	5:56
2.	"Mother of Harlots" (Multi-National Brain Washer Re-mix)	James Mendez	6:31
3.	"Deluge 2370 B.C.E."		6:09
4.	"Mother of Harlots" (Tempo Crusher)	Gary Dassing	8:23

== Personnel ==
Adapted from the False Prophets liner notes.

Mentallo & The Fixer

- Dwayne Dassing (as The Fixer) – sampler, synthesizer, sequencing, programming (1, 3), engineering and remixer (1)
- Gary Dassing (as Mentallo) – vocals, sampler, synthesizer, effects, engineering (2–4), programming (2, 3), programming (3), remixer (4)

Additional performers

- John Bustamante – Moog synthesizer (1)
- Jon Pyre – additional production (2, 4)

Production and design

- Travis Baumann – cover art, illustrations
- Chaos Grafix – design
- James Mendez – mastering, editing and remixer (1, 2)

== Release history ==
Region	Date	Label	Format	Catalog
United States	1997	Metropolis	CD	MET 070
Germany	1997	Off Beat	CD	O-99, SPV 056-43773
