= Continuum (Mentallo & The Fixer album) =

Compilation album by Mentallo & The Fixer
- Released: November 14, 1995
- Recorded: 1990–1993
- Studio: Various: 6 Mile Slum; (San Antonio, Texas); The Slum; (Austin, Texas
- Genre: Electro-industrial
- Length: 71:28
- Label: Metropolis

Mentallo & The Fixer chronology
Mentallo & The Fixer Meets Mainesthai (1994)	Continuum (1995)	Centuries (1997)

Alternative cover
- 2018 remaster cover

Continuum is a compilation album by Mentallo & The Fixer, released on November 14, 1995 by Metropolis Records.

== Music ==
Continuum comprises remastered tracks and remixes from Mentallo & The Fixer's recording sessions circa 1990 to 1993. The collection also draws from the band's first two releases, 1991's Wreckage + Ruin + & + Regrets + (Redemption) and 1992's No Rest for the Wicked.

On February 16, 2018 the album was issued as a music download by Alfa Matrix on the label's Bandcamp.

== Reception ==
Sonic Boom was somewhat positive towards Continuum, calling the album "more of a greatest hits & misses compilation released so that the fans might have an idea of where the band has come from musically" and that "some tracks have the distinct MATF feel to them and others are quite unlike anything else they have ever written before."

== Track listing ==
All tracks are written by Dwayne Dassing and Gary Dassing.

No.	Title	Length
1.	"Wicked" (Extra Sensory Perception)	4:50
2.	"Perish in Peril" (Acoustikal)	4:10
3.	"Mescaline"	1:01
4.	"Narcotic"	7:17
5.	"Doomsday Accelerate"	6:55
6.	"Perish in Peril"	6:42
7.	"Wicked"	6:06
8.	"Clusterfuck"	2:06
9.	"Continuum"	4:58
10.	"Narcotic" (Crystal Methane)	5:11
11.	"Peril"	4:23
12.	"Natalia"	8:17
13.	"Wicked" (Psychokinetic)	11:11

== Personnel ==
Adapted from the Continuum liner notes.

Mentallo & The Fixer

- Dwayne Dassing (as The Fixer) – programming, mastering
- Gary Dassing (as Mentallo) – vocals, programming

Production and design

- Ric Laciak – design
- Chris Spoonts – mastering

== Release history ==
Region	Date	Label	Format	Catalog
United States	1995	Metropolis	CD	MET 013
Germany	1995	Off Beat	CD	SPV 080-22392
Belgium	2018	Alfa Matrix	DL	AM3255DJ
