= Out to Lunch (album) =

Studio album by Mainesthai
- Released: June 1994
- Studios: The Slum (Austin, Texas)
- Genre: Electro-industrial
- Length: 73:38
- Label: Zoth Ommog
- Producers: Dwayne Dassing; Gary Dassing; Michael Greene

Mentallo & The Fixer chronology
Where Angels Fear to Tread (1994)	Out to Lunch (1994)	Meets Mainesthai (1994)

Alternative cover
- 2018 remaster cover

Out to Lunch is the debut studio album of Mainesthai, released in June 1994 by Zoth Ommog Records. It is a side project, along with Benestrophe, of Gary Dassing and Dwayne Dassing of Mentallo & the Fixer with vocalist Michael Greene.

== Music ==
The music of Out to Lunch was entirely composed by Dwayne Dassing and Gary Dassing with Michael Greene writing the lyrics and providing vocals. Like Mentallo & the Fixer's previous albums, Out to Lunch fuses science fiction and horror film samples into its industrial music but with a stronger emphasis on keyboards and unique percussion.

The album was re-released by Metropolis Records on Jananuary 1998 without additional content. On February 16, 2018 it was issued as a music download by Alfa Matrix on the label's Bandcamp

== Reception ==
Professional ratings
Review scores
Source	Rating
AllMusic	3/5 stars

Steve Huey of AllMusic awarded the album three out of five stars and said "Mainesthai's Out to Lunch features aggressive industrial rhythms underpinning the melodic vocals of Mike Greene." Lollipop Magazine commended the band for emphasizing melody but criticized the overall execution of the album. Sonic Boom but was critical of the vocal performances, saying "Mr. Greene has chosen to utilize very stereotypical effects processing which is very uninspiring and ultimately boring." The critic recommended the album to admirers of Mentallo & The Fixer despite noting that the music sounded dated at the time of their review.

== Track listing ==
All lyrics are written by Michael Greene; all music is composed by Dwayne Dassing and Gary Dassing.

No.	Title	Length
1.	"Dollars and Sins"	6:51
2.	"Y" (Mama's Crazy Kitchen Mix)	6:59
3.	"Join the Club"	3:49
4.	"Wartime"	5:16
5.	"Playing God"	6:58
6.	"My Animosity"	5:15
7.	"Therapy"	6:14
8.	"Who You Are"	4:43
9.	"Spectral"	6:16
10.	"Wartime" (Trampled)	5:11
11.	"Y" (Inquiring Minds Mix)	5:34
12.	"Dollars and Sins" (Binge Binge)	5:46
13.	"My Animosity" (Humility Mix)	4:46

== Personnel ==
Adapted from the Out to Lunch liner notes.

Mainesthai

- Dwayne Dassing (as The Fixer) – programming, cover art, illustrations, producer
- Gary Dassing (as Mentallo) – programming, guitar, cover art, illustrations, producer
- Michael Greene – vocals, producer

== Release history ==
Region	Date	Label	Format	Catalog
Germany	1994	Zoth Ommog	CD	ZOT 117
United States	1998	Metropolis	CD	MET 066
Belgium	2008	Alfa Matrix	DL	
Belgium	2018	Alfa Matrix	DL	AM3259DJ
