= Fake Prophet =

Chilean avant-grade metal band

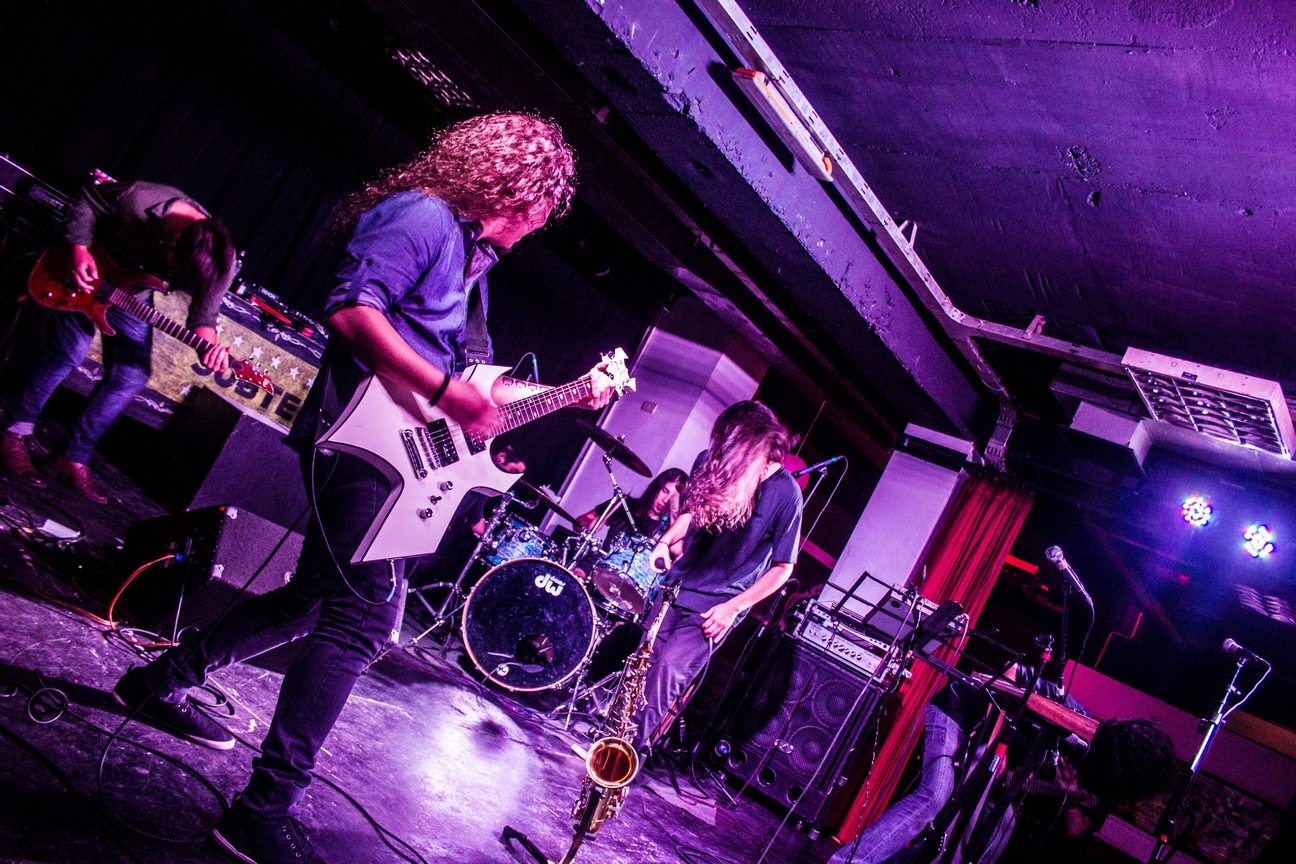
- Fake Prophet during a live performance at Club Subterráneo, Santiago, 2015.

Background information
- Also known as: Death’s Tears (2005–2006)
- Origin: Santiago, Chile
- Genres: Avant-garde metal, experimental rock
- Years active: 2005–present
- Members: José Albornoz; Fernando González; Álvaro Pesce; Javier Tapia; Paulo Muñoz
- Past members: Fernando Macías

Fake Prophet is a Chilean avant-garde metal band formed in Santiago, Chile. Formed in 2005 by vocalist and guitarist José Albornoz, bassist Fernando Gonzalez, vocals and synthesizer Pesce Alvaro Javier Tapia guitarist and drummer Paulo Muñoz.

== History ==
=== Formation (2005–2011) ===
In 2005 the band by Fernando E. Gonzalez and Jose Albornoz under the name Death's Tears is based. Which, they were comprised only its founders. In 2006, the founders changed the name of the band Fake Prophet. In that same year, the band composed a number of songs for their first album Lágrimas de la Muerte.

In early 2007, guitarist Álvaro Pesce and drummer Fernando Macías are integrated, and getting youth awards shows emerging bands. However, Alvaro Pesce and Fernando Macías withdraw from giving it the integration of Javier Tapia and Paulo Muñoz band, and taking their places. Finally, the band decided to leave the project on the composition of Tears album Death to open a new stage.

=== Lejos del Hombre (2012) ===
During this period, Sebastián Pinilla (friend of Javier Tapia) joins the band as sound engineer. place where the band recorded their first album Lejos del Hombre released on February 27, 2012.

The disc became widespread in national radio stations such as Radio SONAR and Radio UNO. In the same year, the band run for sixth call the Festival Escudo (currently Santiago Gets Louders) in the category Emerging Bands, which would obtain as a result the first place. Later, Álvaro Pesce integrate the band again, but as a saxophonist and synthesizer which gave a favorable sound for the band, according to José Albornoz.

=== Tractat de un Sannyas and Fin del Registro (2013) ===
The prize won by 6th Festival Shield, would open the doors for the band recorded their second album in Estudios Rockaxis by the engineer Eugenio Marin, along with the Estudio El Profeta and Sebastian Pinilla. The second album was released on August 27, 2013 entitled Tractat a Sannyas.

On December 29, the band released a bootlegging live is called as Fin del Registro, which boasted a possible dissolution.

=== Sordos (2014–present) ===
Despite the possible dissolution, in late January the band recorded their third studio album titled Sordos. The album was recorded in Sordos Estudio El Profeta since, was released on May 5 of that year.

== Band members ==
=== Current members ===
- José Albornoz – lead vocalist, guitar (2005–present)
- Fernando González – bass (2005–present)
- Álvaro Pesce – vocalist, alto saxophone, synthesizer, guitar (2007–2008; 2012–present)
- Javier Tapia – guitar (2008–present)
- Paulo Muñoz – drums (2008–present)

=== Former members ===
- Fernando Macías – drums (2007–2008)

== Discography ==
=== Studio albums ===
- Lágrimas de la Muerte (2006) (canceled)
- Lejos del Hombre (2012)
- Tractat de un Sannyas (2013)
- Sordos (2014)

=== Live album ===
- Fin del Registro (2013)

=== Music videos ===
Year	Song	Album
2012	Entre La Tierra Y El Cielo	Lejos del Hombre
2012	Alma	Lejos del Hombre
2013	Nimio	Tractat de un Sannyas
2014	Inestable	Sordos
2014	Indico	Sordos
