= Revelations 23 =

Studio album by Mentallo & The Fixer
- Released: February 1993
- Studios: The Slum (Austin, Texas)
- Genre: Electro-industrial
- Length: 71:28
- Label: Zoth Ommog
- Producer: Gary Dassing

Mentallo & The Fixer chronology
No Rest for the Wicked (1992)	Revelations 23 (1993)	Sensory Deprivation (1994)

Alternative cover
- 2018 reissue cover

Revelations 23 is the second studio album by Mentallo & The Fixer, released in February 1993 by Zoth Ommog Records.

== Music ==
Revelations 23 presented the band utilizing their densely layered compositional technique based around sequencer rhythms, dance beats and distorted vocals to create a more accessible sound. Comparatively, the album presents a more polished sound than its predecessor, 1992's No Rest for the Wicked, and further use of samples. The album Founding members Dwayne Dassing and Gary Dassing have both admitted to having an interest in astronomy, which inspired the album's cover art.

On May 16, 1995, the album was re-released by Metropolis Records and included the track "Decomposed" (Grimpen Ward Mix), which was previously only available the There Is No Time compilation by Ras Dva Records. In 2014 the album was issued as a music download by Alfa Matrix. The entire album was remastered and released on December 2, 2014, as the first disc of the Zothera box set.

== Reception ==
Professional ratings
Review scores
Source	Rating
AllMusic	3/5 stars

Theo Kavadias of AllMusic gave Revelations 23 three out of five stars, praising the album's opening for its "epics of over seven minutes apiece" that "never seem to diminish in power" and the Mentallo & The Fixer's "use of uncomplicated and effective sounds, in addition to the abandonment of the usual song structures that most industrial music to date has adhered to, gives the focus over to the melody, which is also often very simple and has an invariably harsh intensity." Sonic Boom called the band "the new messiah of electro-horror" and praised the album's "intricate programming, unique percussion and deeply layered rhythms." Peek-A-Boo Magazine praised the band's maturation as composers and pointed to the tracks "Grim Reality", "Inhumanities", "Legion of Lepers" and "Rapid Suffocation" as being the album's highlights. A critic at Keyboard pointed to "Grim Reality" as an early example composer Gary Dassing's unique analog technique.

== Track listing ==
All tracks are written by Dwayne Dassing and Gary Dassing, except "Grim Reality" with lyrics co-written by Jon Pyre.

No.	Title	Length
1.	"Ancient Languagez"	6:45
2.	"Legion of Lepers"	9:14
3.	"Fusion Mutation"	6:46
4.	"Pulse Hemorrhage" (Lesionary Mix)	9:39
5.	"Rapid Suffocation"	5:55
6.	"Amplitude Interference"	7:37
7.	"Inhumanities"	4:54
8.	"Cerebral Statik Overdose"	4:21
9.	"Soaked With Blood" (T.H.C. Edit)	3:19
10.	"Grim Reality"	8:12
11.	"Scum of the Earth" (Bloody)	3:29
12.	"Bleek Seclusion"	1:17

1995 remastered bonus track
No.	Title	Length
13.	"Decomposed" (Grimpen Ward Mix)	4:25

== Personnel ==
Adapted from the Revelations 23 liner notes.

Mentallo & The Fixer

- Dwayne Dassing (as The Fixer) – programming, arrangements, co-producer, illustrations, editing (9, 11)
- Gary Dassing (as Mentallo) – programming, arrangements, producer, engineering, mixing, illustrations, editing (9, 11)

Production and design

- Hype Graphics (as hype graphics/Berlin) – design
- Jon Pyre – editing (11)

== Release history ==
Region	Date	Label	Format	Catalog
Germany	1993	Zoth Ommog	CD	ZOT 15
United States	1995	Metropolis	CD	MET 003
Belgium	2014	Alfa Matrix	DL	
