= Centuries (EP) =

EP by Mentallo & The Fixer
- Released: February 25, 1997
- Studio: The Slum (Austin, Texas)
- Genre: Electro-industrial
- Length: 34:08
- Label: Metropolis
- Producer: Dwayne Dassing; Gary Dassing

Mentallo & The Fixer chronology
Continuum (1995)	Centuries (1997)	Auric Fires (1997)

Centuries is an EP by Mentallo & The Fixer, released on February 25, 1997, by Metropolis Records.

== Reception ==
Last Sigh Magazine was somewhat positive in their review of Centuries and pointed to the tracks "Stellar Cascade" (Spore-Print) and "Other World Technology" (Re-Mix) as being its strongest moments. Sonic Boom commended the band for diversifying their style, saying "'Other World Technologies', is the most club friendly Mentallo song to date" and "'Lightyear' & 'Stellar Cascade' seem to lack much of the signature Mentallo keyboard sound as well."

== Track listing ==
All tracks are written by Dwayne Dassing and Gary Dassing.

No.	Title	Length
1.	"Other World Technology" (Har-Magedon)	5:18
2.	"Other World Technology" (Crytik-Cut)	3:48
3.	"Lightyear" (Equation)	7:08
4.	"Stellar Cascade" (Spore-Print)	7:26
5.	"Other World Technology" (Re-Mix)	5:09
6.	"Other World Technology" (Mescal-Mix)	5:17

== Personnel ==
Adapted from the Centuries liner notes.

Mentallo & The Fixer

- Dwayne Dassing (as The Fixer) – programming and engineering (1–3, 5, 6), mixing (1–3, 4, 5), producer (2, 3, 5, 6), remixer (4)
- Gary Dassing (as Mentallo) – programming, producer (1, 2, 3, 4), editing (1–3), mixing (1, 2), remixer (4)

Production and design

- Brett Caraway – mastering
- Dane Rougeau – cover art, design

== Release history ==
Region	Date	Label	Format	Catalog
United States	1997	Metropolis	CD	MET 036
Germany	1997	Off Beat	CD	O-84, SPV 065-43532
