= Algorythum =

Studio album by Mentallo & The Fixer
- Released: February 16, 1999
- Studio: Various: Proxima Base; Scott Leever (Austin, Texas)
- Genre: Electro-industrial
- Length: 69:21
- Label: Metropolis

Mentallo & The Fixer chronology
| Systematik Ruin (1999) | Algorythum (1999) | Love Is the Law (2000) |

Algorythum is the fifth studio album by Mentallo & The Fixer, released on February 16, 1999, by Metropolis Records. It was the band's first release without founding member Dwayne Dassing and was dedicated to his sister Danielle Dassing.

== Reception ==
Professional ratings
Review scores
| Source | Rating |
|---|---|
| AllMusic | 3/5 stars |

Steve Huey of AllMusic said "although the group's overall sound hasn't changed much without Dwayne, since Gary composed most of their best-known songs, there is a slightly more adventurous quality to the record, even if there are no radical rethinkings." Last Sigh Magazine called the album a "peaceful overall work of music with a touch of noise, a good deal of programming on the more gentle side of things and some experimental in terms of how the release congeals in continuity to bring about a new direction for Mentallo & The Fixer." Ink 19 commended the band's new direction despite losing a member.

== Track listing ==
All tracks are written by Gary Dassing.

| No. | Title | Length |
|---|---|---|
| 1. | "Intro" | 4:27 |
| 2. | "Systematik Ruin" | 5:50 |
| 3. | "Gamma Ray Antenna" | 2:56 |
| 4. | "Proxima" | 6:20 |
| 5. | "Unearthed" | 5:19 |
| 6. | "Choice Flaw" | 6:30 |
| 7. | "Carbon Based" | 7:08 |
| 8. | "Stumbled" | 8:26 |
| 9. | "Revelry" | 5:51 |
| 10. | "Luminaries" | 4:34 |
| 11. | "Resonant Echo" | 3:56 |
| 12. | "Remnants Past" | 6:35 |
| 13. | "Theme" | 1:29 |

== Personnel ==
Adapted from the Algorythum liner notes.

Mentallo & The Fixer

- Gary Dassing (as Mentallo) – vocals, synthesizer, sampler, guitar, drum programming, sequencing, mastering, recording, engineering, mixing

Additional musicians

- John Bustamante – vocals (2, 5, 7, 8), additional synthesizer (1)
- Todd Kreth – electric guitar and bass guitar (11)
- Jon Pyre – vocals (1, 3, 4, 6, 9), additional sequencing and additional programming (12)

Production and design

- Chris Cline – mastering, recording, live drums (1–3, 5, 6, 8), sampler (9), acoustic guitar (11)
- Carlos Rosales – cover art, design

== Release history ==
| Region | Date | Label | Format | Catalog |
|---|---|---|---|---|
| United States | 1999 | Metropolis | CD | MET 123 |
| Germany | 1999 | Off Beat | CD | O-133, SPV 085-49092 |
