= Burnt Beyond Recognition =

Studio album by Mentallo & The Fixer
- Released: June 10, 1997
- Studio: The Slum (Austin, Texas)
- Genre: Electro-industrial
- Length: 73:44
- Label: Metropolis
- Producer: Dwayne Dassing; Gary Dassing; Jon Pyre

Mentallo & The Fixer chronology
...There's No Air to Breathe (1997)	Burnt Beyond Recognition (1997)	False Prophets (1997)

Alternative cover
- Alternate cover

Burnt Beyond Recognition is the fourth studio album by Mentallo & The Fixer, released on June 10, 1997, by Metropolis Records.

== Music ==
For Burnt Beyond Recognition, the Mentallo & The Fixer changed direction from the aggressive electro-industrial represented on previous albums to composing complex and melodic instrumental pieces. It has been posited that the album's concept is about the evolution of man.

== Reception ==
Professional ratings
Review scores
Source	Rating
Culture Shock	6/7
Sonic Boom	Favorable

The Burnt Beyond Recognition has been considered a dividing point for critics and the band's audiences.

== Track listing ==
All tracks are written by Dwayne Dassing and Gary Dassing.

No.	Title	Length
1.	"Tachyon"	5:23
2.	"Crypto-Anarchist"	3:35
3.	"Mother of Harlots"	9:02
4.	"Goliath"	7:13
5.	"Radiant"	9:36
6.	"Crypto-Anarchist" (The Second Death)	8:35
7.	"The Enlightenment"	1:38
8.	"Lightyear"	7:30
9.	"False Prophets"	6:03
10.	"Other World Technology"	5:12
11.	"Abandon All Hope"	9:57

== Personnel ==
Adapted from the Burnt Beyond Recognition liner notes.

Mentallo & The Fixer

- Dwayne Dassing (as The Fixer) – programming, sampler, sequencing, synthesizer, producer, engineering and mixing (8–11)
- Gary Dassing (as Mentallo) –vocals, programming, synthesizer, mastering, producer, engineering and mixing (1–7)

Additional musician

- John Bustamante – Moog synthesizer (9)
- Todd Kreth – bass guitar (6)

Production and design

- Travis Baumann – cover art, illustrations
- Ric Laciak – engineering
- Modern Design – illustrations, design
- Jon Pyre – producer (1–7)
- Cindy Spoonts – photography

== Release history ==
Region	Date	Label	Format	Catalog
United States	1997	Metropolis	CD	MET 044
Germany	1997	Off Beat	CD	O-87, SPV 085–43582
