= No Rest for the Wicked (Mentallo & The Fixer album) =

Studio album by Mentallo & The Fixer
- Released: 1992
- Recorded: 1990 – 1991
- Studios: 6 Mile Slum (San Antonio, Texas)
- Genre: Electro-industrial
- Length: 72:41
- Labels: Simbiose

Mentallo & The Fixer chronology
Wreckage + Ruin + & + Regrets + (Redemption) (1991)	No Rest for the Wicked (1992)	Revelations 23 (1993)

Alternative cover
- 2018 reissue cover

No Rest for the Wicked is the debut studio album of Mentallo & The Fixer, released in 1992 by Simbiose Records.

== Music ==
Mentallo & The Fixer was recognized for performing raw electro-industrial music and had already released the 1991 split album .5 Honkey/Wreckage + Ruin + & + Regrets + (Redemption) with Non-Aggression Pact. 1992's No Rest for the Wicked was the band first major underground release and while the recording was low-budget it introduced their audience to the band's dynamic energy and sense of melody. The recording sessions were completed during 1990 and 1991 but the album's release was stalled for personal reasons by the band, with founding member Gary Dassing discussing the lyrics as being about his sister's placement in an asylum.

In 1997 the album was re-released on two discs by Metropolis Records and included unfinished and unreleased tracks from the same recording sessions, new mastering by composer Gary Dassing and new artwork and packaging. On March 24, 1998, the set was reissued by Zoth Ommog Records and ostensibly contained identical musical content to the album's Metropolis release. The songs "Telepath" and "Narcotic Calling" were left off the re-issue because they were released on the 1995 album Continuum. In 2018 the album was issued by Alfa Matrix as a music download on the label's Bandcamp.

== Reception ==
Professional ratings
Review scores
Source	Rating
AllMusic	2.5/5 stars

Theo Kavadias of AllMusic gave No Rest for the Wicked two out of five stars, criticizing the album for "lacking the refinement of later Mentallo & the Fixer work" but commending the band for having "abstained from the typical verse-chorus structures which still predominate most industrial music, which has meant that the interest is held largely by the dynamic energies of the melodies, and these melodies are packed with a raw energy and harsh evocative power (the first track, "When Worlds Collide," and "Schizoid Embolism" spring to mind), making this release well worth its time." Lollipop Magazine reviewed the remastered two-disc edition by Metropolis and commended the band for updating the album's sound and including additional compositions. In_Faction also reviewed the 1997 re-issue and said "evil, destructive beats wrap around sinister and sometimes gothic keyboards and samples, creating an atmosphere which only could have been inspired by the turmoils within Gary Dassing's mind at work."

== Track listing ==
All tracks are written by Dwayne Dassing and Gary Dassing.

No.	Title	Length
1.	"When Worlds Collide"	8:10
2.	"Critically Wounded"	4:53
3.	"Disrupture"	7:43
4.	"Telepath"	6:01
5.	"Breeder"	8:02
6.	"Lunatik"	4:17
7.	"Narcotik Calling"	7:08
8.	"Incantions" (Paranormal Mix)	6:49
9.	"Divine Intervention"	6:09
10.	"Schizoid Embolism" (Stress Mix)	5:22
11.	"Bed Time Story" (Angel of Death Mix)	2:53
12.	"Day of Ascention 2206"	5:14

2018 digital reissue track listing
No.	Title	Length
1.	"When Worlds Collide"	8:11
2.	"Disrupter"	7:47
3.	"Brutal Rapture"	8:31
4.	"Day of Ascension"	5:17
5.	"Critically Wounded"	4:59
6.	"Lunatik" (Re-mix)	7:23
7.	"Cerebral Statik (Part One)"	0:54
8.	"Schizoid Embolism"	5:23
9.	"Overloaded"	4:53
10.	"Breeder"	8:03
11.	"Worlds Collide"	2:48
12.	"Cerebral Statik (Part Two)"	1:24
13.	"Divine Intervention"	6:06
14.	"Hope"	6:29
15.	"Telepath"	3:53
16.	"Brutal Rapture" (Re-mix)	7:03
17.	"Narcosis"	3:15
18.	"Story (Part One)"	1:22
19.	"Disrupture" (Re-mix)	3:01
20.	"Vision"	7:42
21.	"Retribution"	9:02
22.	"The Radium Bomb Aftermath"	7:32
23.	"Story (Part Two)"	2:57
24.	"Dias Muerto"	14:25
25.	"Lunatik"	4:13

== Personnel ==
Adapted from the No Rest for the Wicked liner notes.

Mentallo & The Fixer

- Dwayne Dassing – programming, engineering, mixing
- Gary Dassing – programming, engineering, mixing

Production and design

- Luis Carlos – cover art, design, illustrations
- Jose Ricardo – cover art, design, illustrations

== Release history ==
Region	Date	Label	Format	Catalog
Portugal	1992	Simbiose	CD, LP	BIO 02
United States	1997	Metropolis	CD	MET 055
Germany	1998	Zoth Ommog	CD	ZOT 215
Belgium	2018	Alfa Matrix	DL	AM3254DJ
