= Where Angels Fear to Tread (Mentallo & The Fixer album) =

Studio album by Mentallo & The Fixer
- Released: May 16, 1994
- Studio: The Slum (Austin, Texas)
- Genre: Electro-industrial
- Length: 76:17
- Label: Zoth Ommog
- Producer: Gary Dassing

Mentallo & The Fixer chronology
Sensory Deprivation (1994)	Where Angels Fear to Tread (1994)	Out to Lunch (1994)

Alternative cover
- 2014 reissue cover

Where Angels Fear to Tread is the third studio album by Mentallo & The Fixer, released on May 16, 1994, by Zoth Ommog Records. It is considered a favorite of the band's critics and audience.

== Music ==
Where Angels Fear to Tread integrated gothic music into its sound, making its compositions sound more melancholy in contrast to the abrasive sound of the band's previous work. The album's music also made extensive use of you use of science fiction and horror film samples.

The album was re-released by Metropolis Records on July 18, 1995, without additional content. In 2014, the album was issued as a music download by Alfa Matrix. The entire album was remastered and released as part of the Zothera box set on December 2, 2014.

== Reception ==
Professional ratings
Review scores
Source	Rating
AllMusic	4/5 stars

Theo Kavadias of AllMusic says the "progression in this third release points to a more refined and polished electronic sound that sacrifices none of the dark intensity or raw power established in previous releases." The critic went on to say "there is more to Where Angels Fear to Tread than smoother synth voices playing out the complex, pulsing melodies and layered compositions for which Mentallo & the Fixer have become known" and "doomy, tortured vocals have found slightly different tones throughout the release, and tracks such as "Virtually Hopeless," "Sacrilege," and "Decomposed (Trampled)," seem to be reaching in new directions, achieving a new and smoother tone, with ethereal highlights and a more even pace." Sonic Boom said "It's not often that you find a band with such an astute sense of direction coupled with a cohesive album concept and musical style." Peek-A-Boo Magazine noted the song "Sacrilege" as being a shining example of the band's craft and said "other excellent tracks that combine pulsing beats, melancholic synths and awsome [sic?] percussion are Decomposed, Abominations unleashed, Ruthless (with samples from Blade Runner) and Afterglow."

== Track listing ==
All tracks are written by Dwayne Dassing and Gary Dassing.

No.	Title	Length
1.	"Gargantua"	2:33
2.	"Decomposed" (Trampled)	6:33
3.	"Sacrilege"	4:10
4.	"Bring to a Boil"	9:30
5.	"Virtually Hopeless"	4:46
6.	"Coward" (Submerged)	6:19
7.	"Ruthless"	5:41
8.	"Afterglow"	6:29
9.	"Battered States of Euphoria"	6:00
10.	"Abominations Unleashed"	4:48
11.	"Dead Days"	4:31
12.	"Atom Smasher"	6:20
13.	"Power Struggle"	2:51
14.	"Sacrilege" (Grimpen Ward)	5:46

== Personnel ==
Adapted from the Where Angels Fear to Tread liner notes.

Mentallo & The Fixer

- Dwayne Dassing (as The Fixer) – programming, cover art, illustrations
- Gary Dassing (as Mentallo) – programming, cover art, illustrations

Production and design

- Hype Graphics (as hype graphics/Berlin) – cover, design

== Release history ==
Region	Date	Label	Format	Catalog
Germany	1994	Zoth Ommog	CD	ZOT 108
United States	1995	Metropolis	CD	MET 008
Belgium	2014	Alfa Matrix	DL	
