= Combinatorial search =

In computer science and artificial intelligence, combinatorial search studies search algorithms for solving instances of problems that are believed to be hard in general, by efficiently exploring the usually large solution space of these instances. Combinatorial search algorithms achieve this efficiency by reducing the effective size of the search space or employing heuristics. Some algorithms are guaranteed to find the optimal solution, while others may only return the best solution found in the part of the state space that was explored.

Classic combinatorial search problems include solving the eight queens puzzle or evaluating moves in games with a large game tree, such as reversi or chess.

A study of computational complexity theory helps to motivate combinatorial search. Combinatorial search algorithms are typically concerned with problems that are NP-hard. Such problems are not believed to be efficiently solvable in general. However, the various approximations of complexity theory suggest that some instances (e.g. "small" instances) of these problems could be efficiently solved. This is indeed the case, and such instances often have important practical ramifications.

== Examples ==
Common algorithms for solving combinatorial search problems include:

- A* search algorithm
- Alpha–beta pruning
- Branch-and-bound
- Minimax

== Lookahead ==
Lookahead is an important component of combinatorial search, which specifies, roughly, how deeply the graph representing the problem is explored. The need for a specific limit on lookahead comes from the large problem graphs in many applications, such as computer chess and computer Go. A naive breadth-first search of these graphs would quickly consume all the memory of any modern computer. By setting a specific lookahead limit, the algorithm's time can be carefully controlled; its time increases exponentially as the lookahead limit increases.

More sophisticated search techniques such as alpha–beta pruning are able to eliminate entire subtrees of the search tree from consideration. When these techniques are used, lookahead is not a precisely defined quantity, but instead either the maximum depth searched or some type of average.

== See also ==
- Brute-force search
- Combinatorial explosion
- Combinatorial optimization
- Search algorithm
- State space search
