= Maze-solving algorithm =

Automated method for solving mazes

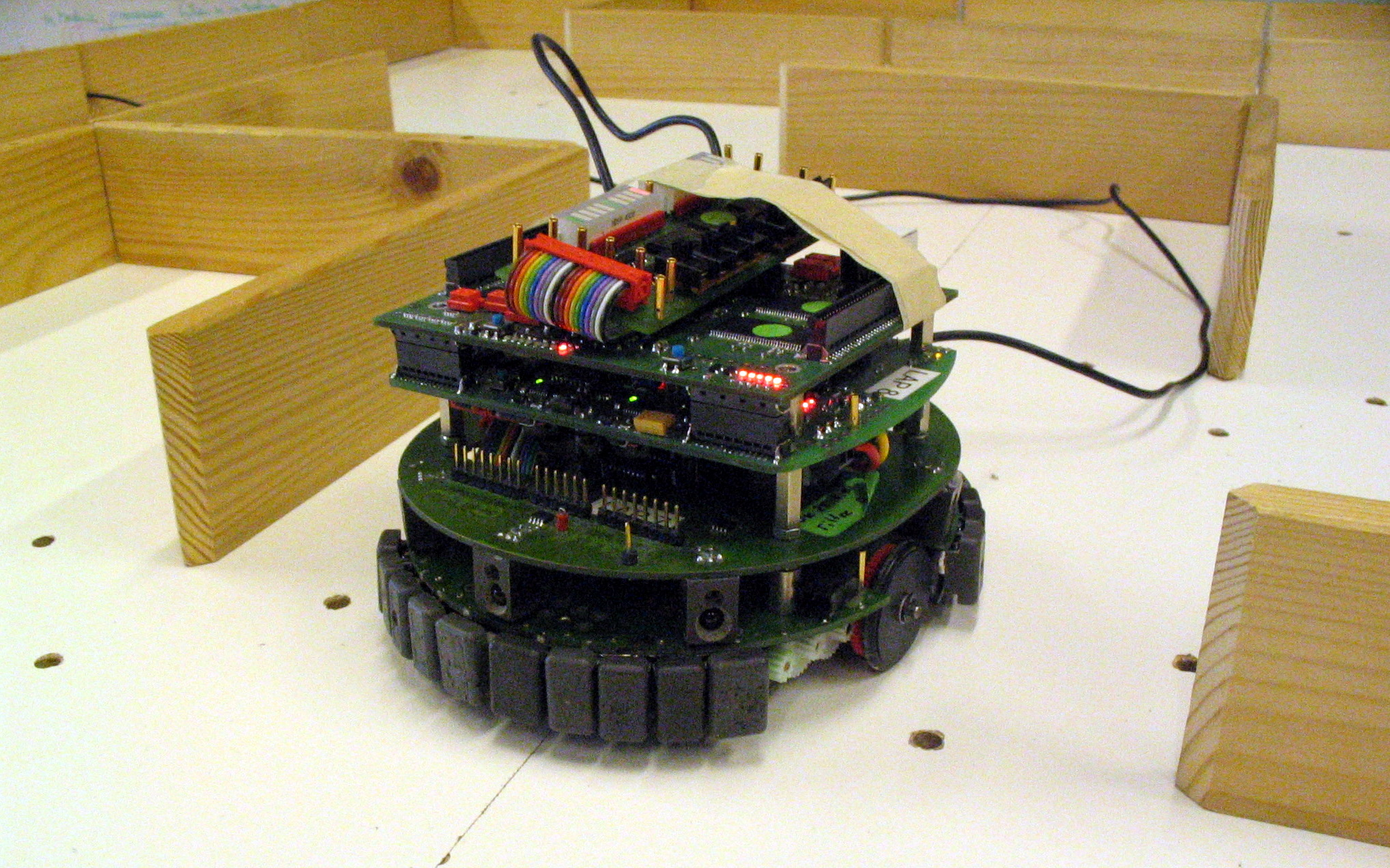
Robot in a wooden maze

A maze-solving algorithm is an automated method for solving a maze. The random mouse, wall follower, Pledge, Tarry's, and Trémaux's algorithms are designed to be used inside the maze by a traveler with no prior knowledge of the maze, whereas the dead-end filling and shortest path algorithms are designed to be used by a person or computer program that can see the whole maze at once.

Mazes containing no loops are known as "simply connected", or "perfect" mazes, and are equivalent to a tree in graph theory. Maze-solving algorithms are closely related to graph theory. Intuitively, if one pulled and stretched out the paths in the maze in the proper way, the result could be made to resemble a tree.

== Random mouse algorithm ==
This simple method can be implemented by a very unintelligent robot or perhaps a mouse, because it does not require any memory. The robot proceeds following the current passage until a junction is reached, and then makes a random decision about the next direction to follow. Although such a method would always eventually find the right solution, the algorithm can be very slow.

== Hand-on-wall rule ==
Traversal using the right-hand rule (animation)

One effective rule for traversing mazes is the hand-on-wall rule, also known as either the left-hand rule or the right-hand rule. If the maze is simply connected, that is, all its walls are connected together or to the maze's outer boundary, then by keeping one hand in contact with one wall of the maze the solver is guaranteed not to get lost and will reach a different exit if there is one; otherwise, the algorithm will return to the entrance having traversed every corridor next to that connected section of walls at least once. The algorithm is a depth-first in-order tree traversal.

Another perspective into why wall following works is topological. If the walls are connected, then they may be deformed into a loop or circle. Then wall following reduces to walking around a circle from start to finish. To further this idea, notice that by grouping together connected components of the maze walls, the boundaries between these are precisely the solutions, even if there is more than one solution.

If the maze is not simply-connected (i.e. if the start or endpoints are in the center of the structure surrounded by passage loops, or the pathways cross over and under each other and such parts of the solution path are surrounded by passage loops), this method will not necessarily reach the goal.

Another concern is that care should be taken to begin wall-following at the entrance to the maze. If the maze is not simply-connected and one begins wall-following at an arbitrary point inside the maze, one could find themselves trapped along a separate wall that loops around on itself and containing no entrances or exits. Should it be the case that wall-following begins late, attempt to mark the position in which wall-following began. Because wall-following will always lead you back to where you started, if you come across your starting point a second time, you can conclude the maze is not simply-connected, and you should switch to an alternative wall not yet followed. See the Pledge Algorithm, below, for an alternative methodology.

Wall-following can be done in 3D or higher-dimensional mazes if its higher-dimensional passages can be projected onto the 2D plane in a deterministic manner. For example, if in a 3D maze "up" passages can be assumed to lead Northwest, and "down" passages can be assumed to lead southeast, then standard wall following rules can apply. However, unlike in 2D, this requires that the current orientation is known, to determine which direction is the first on the left or right.

A simulation of this algorithm working can be found here.

== Pledge algorithm ==
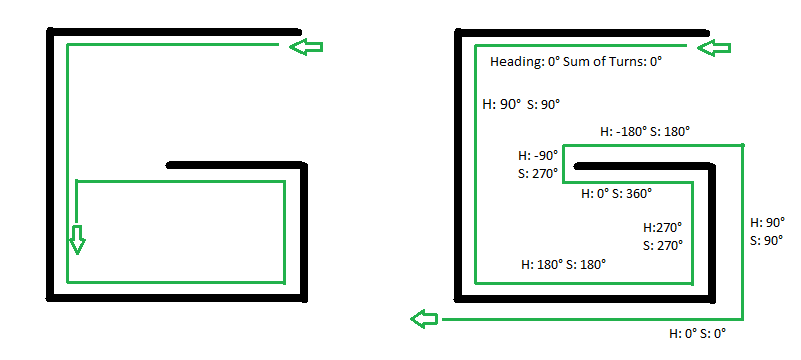
Left: Left-turn solver trapped Right: Pledge algorithm solution

Disjoint (where walls are not connected to the outer boundary/boundary is not closed) mazes can be solved with the wall follower method, so long as the entrance and exit to the maze are on the outer walls of the maze. If however, the solver starts inside the maze, it might be on a section disjoint from the exit, and wall followers will continually go around their ring. The Pledge algorithm (named after Jon Pledge of Exeter) can solve this problem.

The Pledge algorithm, designed to circumvent obstacles, requires an arbitrarily chosen direction to go toward, which will be preferential. When an obstacle is met, one hand (say the right hand) is kept along the obstacle while the angles turned are counted (clockwise turn is positive, counter-clockwise turn is negative). When the solver is facing the original preferential direction again, and the angular sum of the turns made is 0, the solver leaves the obstacle and continues moving in its original direction.

The hand is removed from the wall only when both "sum of turns made" and "current heading" are at zero. This allows the algorithm to avoid traps shaped like an upper case letter "G". Assuming the algorithm turns left at the first wall, one gets turned around a full 360 degrees by the walls. An algorithm that only keeps track of "current heading" leads into an infinite loop as it leaves the lower rightmost wall heading left and runs into the curved section on the left hand side again. The Pledge algorithm does not leave the rightmost wall due to the "sum of turns made" not being zero at that point (note 360 degrees is not equal to 0 degrees). It follows the wall all the way around, finally leaving it heading left outside and just underneath the letter shape.

This algorithm allows a person with a compass to find their way from any point inside to an outer exit of any finite two-dimensional maze, regardless of the initial position of the solver. However, this algorithm will not work in doing the reverse, namely finding the way from an entrance on the outside of a maze to some end goal within it.

== Trémaux's algorithm ==
Trémaux's algorithm. The large green dot shows the current position, the small blue dots show single marks on entrances, and the red crosses show double marks. Once the exit is found, the route is traced through the singly marked entrances. Two marks are placed simultaneously each time the green dot arrives at a junction. This is a quirk of the illustration; each mark should in actuality be placed whenever the green dot passes through the location of the mark.

Trémaux's algorithm, invented by Charles Pierre Trémaux, is an efficient method to find the way out of a maze that requires drawing lines on the floor to mark a path, and is guaranteed to work for all mazes that have well-defined passages, but it is not guaranteed to find the shortest route.

An entrance of a passage is either unvisited, marked once or marked twice. Marking an entrance is not the same as marking a junction or a passage, because a junction may have multiple entrances, and a passage has an entrance at both ends. Dead ends can be thought of as junctions with one entrance.

The algorithm works according to the following rules:

- When passing through an entrance, whether it is to enter or exit a junction, the entrance is marked.
- When at a junction, the first applicable rule will determine the entrance to exit through:
  1. If only the entrance one just passed through is marked, an arbitrary unmarked entrance is picked, if any. This rule also applies if there are no marked entrances.
  2. The entrance one just passed through is picked if any other entrances are marked, unless it is marked twice.
  3. Any entrance with the fewest marks is picked (zero if possible, else one).

The "turn around and return" rule effectively transforms any maze with loops into a simply connected one; whenever a path that would close a loop is found, it is treated as a dead end and one returns. Without this rule, it is possible to cut off one's access to still-unexplored parts of a maze if, instead of turning back, another arbitrary entrance is picked.

When the exit is reached, entrances marked exactly once will indicate a way back to the start. If there is no exit, this method will bring one back to the start where all entrances are marked twice. In this case each passage is walked down exactly twice, once in each direction. The resulting walk is called a bidirectional double-tracing.

Essentially, this algorithm, which was discovered in the 19th century, has been used about a hundred years later as depth-first search.

== Tarry's algorithm ==
Tarry’s algorithm, published by Gaston Tarry in 1895 in Le problème des labyrinthes, is a method for traversing a maze or connected undirected graph with no prior knowledge of the maze layout. It is similar to Trémaux’s algorithm in that it uses maze marking to record exploration progress. The algorithm guarantees complete traversal and termination; each edge is traversed at most twice, once in each direction. It can be expressed as a single rule, described by MacTutor as “particularly suitable to computer implementation”: Do not exit from an intersection the way you came in until all other exits have been explored. It is now considered to be an early depth-first-search-like procedure.

== Dead-end filling ==
External videos
- Maze Strategy: Dead End Filling
- Maze Solving algorithm

Dead-end filling is an algorithm for solving mazes that fills all dead ends, leaving only the correct ways unfilled. It can be used for solving mazes on paper or with a computer program, but it is not useful to a person inside an unknown maze since this method looks at the entire maze at once. The method is to

1. find all of the dead-ends in the maze, and then
2. "fill in" the path from each dead-end until the first junction is met.

Note that some passages won't become parts of dead end passages until other dead ends are removed first. A video of dead-end filling in action can be seen to the right.

Dead-end filling cannot accidentally "cut off" the start from the finish since each step of the process preserves the topology of the maze. Furthermore, the process won't stop "too soon" since the result cannot contain any dead-ends. Thus if dead-end filling is done on a perfect maze (maze with no loops), then only the solution will remain. If it is done on a partially braid maze (maze with some loops), then every possible solution will remain but nothing more.

== Recursive algorithm ==
If given an omniscient view of the maze, a simple recursive algorithm can tell one how to get to the end. The algorithm will be given a starting X and Y value. If the X and Y values are not on a wall, the method will call itself with all adjacent X and Y values, making sure that it did not already use those X and Y values before. If the X and Y values are those of the end location, it will save all the previous instances of the method as the correct path.

This is in effect a depth-first search expressed in term of grid points. The omniscient view prevents entering loops by memorization. Here is a sample code in Java:

boolean[][] maze = new boolean[width][height]; // The maze
boolean[][] wasHere = new boolean[width][height];
boolean[][] correctPath = new boolean[width][height]; // The solution to the maze
int startX, startY; // Starting X and Y values of maze
int endX, endY;     // Ending X and Y values of maze

public void solveMaze() {
    maze = generateMaze(); // Create Maze (false = path, true = wall)

    // Below assignment to false is redundant as Java assigns array elements to false by default, but it is included because other languages may not behave the same.
    for (int row = 0; row < maze.length; row++)  
        // Sets boolean Arrays to default values
        for (int col = 0; col < maze[row].length; col++){
            wasHere[row][col] = false;
            correctPath[row][col] = false;
        }
    boolean b = recursiveSolve(startX, startY);
    // Will leave you with a boolean array (correctPath) 
    // with the path indicated by true values.
    // If b is false, there is no solution to the maze
}
public boolean recursiveSolve(int x, int y) {
    if (x == endX && y == endY) return true; // If you reached the end
    if (maze[x][y] || wasHere[x][y]) return false;
    // If you are on a wall or already were here
    wasHere[x][y] = true;
    if (x != 0) // Checks if not on left edge
        if (recursiveSolve(x-1, y)) { // Recalls method one to the left
            correctPath[x][y] = true; // Sets that path value to true;
            return true;
        }
    if (x != width - 1) // Checks if not on right edge
        if (recursiveSolve(x+1, y)) { // Recalls method one to the right
            correctPath[x][y] = true;
            return true;
        }
    if (y != 0)  // Checks if not on top edge
        if (recursiveSolve(x, y-1)) { // Recalls method one up
            correctPath[x][y] = true;
            return true;
        }
    if (y != height - 1) // Checks if not on bottom edge
        if (recursiveSolve(x, y+1)) { // Recalls method one down
            correctPath[x][y] = true;
            return true;
        }
    return false;
}

== Maze-routing algorithm ==
The maze-routing algorithm is a low overhead method to find the way between any two locations of the maze. The algorithm is initially proposed for chip multiprocessors (CMPs) domain and guarantees to work for any grid-based maze. In addition to finding paths between two locations of the grid (maze), the algorithm can detect when there is no path between the source and destination. Also, the algorithm is to be used by an inside traveler with no prior knowledge of the maze with fixed memory complexity regardless of the maze size; requiring 4 variables in total for finding the path and detecting the unreachable locations. Nevertheless, the algorithm is not to find the shortest path.

Maze-routing algorithm uses the notion of Manhattan distance (MD) and relies on the property of grids that the MD increments/decrements exactly by 1 when moving from one location to any 4 neighboring locations. Here is the pseudocode without the capability to detect unreachable locations.

Point src, dst;// Source and destination coordinates
// cur also indicates the coordinates of the current location
int MD_best = MD(src, dst);// It stores the closest MD we ever had to dst
// A productive path is the one that makes our MD to dst smaller
while (cur != dst) {
    if (there exists a productive path) {
        Take the productive path;
    } else {
        MD_best = MD(cur, dst);
        Imagine a line between cur and dst;
        Take the first path in the left/right of the line; // The left/right selection affects the following hand rule
        while (MD(cur, dst) != MD_best || there does not exist a productive path) {
            Follow the right-hand/left-hand rule; // The opposite of the selected side of the line
    }
}

== Shortest path algorithm ==
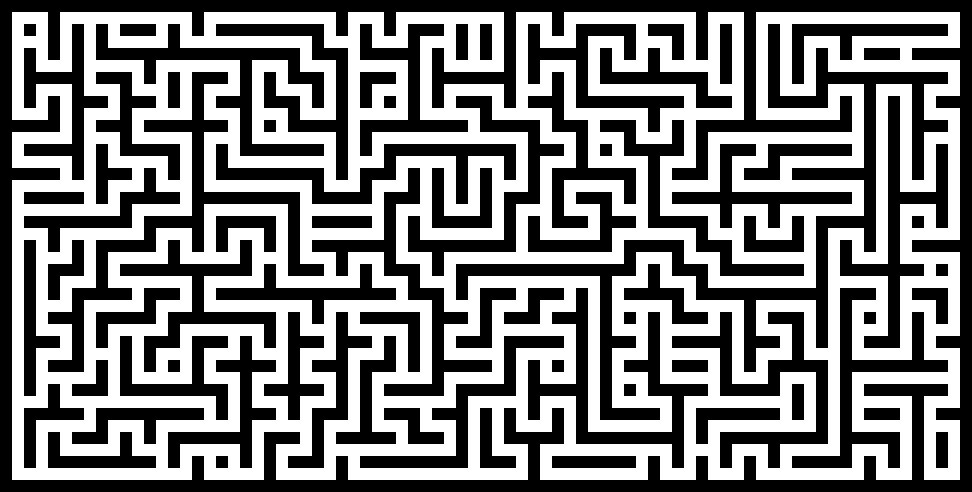
A maze with many solutions and no dead-ends, where it may be useful to find the shortest path

When a maze has multiple solutions, the solver may want to find the shortest path from start to finish. There are several algorithms to find shortest paths, most of them coming from graph theory. One such algorithm finds the shortest path by implementing a breadth-first search, while another, the A* algorithm, uses a heuristic technique. The breadth-first search algorithm uses a queue to visit cells in increasing distance order from the start until the finish is reached. Each visited cell needs to keep track of its distance from the start or which adjacent cell nearer to the start caused it to be added to the queue. When the finish location is found, follow the path of cells backwards to the start, which is the shortest path. The breadth-first search in its simplest form has its limitations, like finding the shortest path in weighted graphs.

== Multi-agent maze-solving ==
Collective exploration refers to the exploration of an unknown environment by multiple mobile agents that move at the same speed. This model was introduced to study the paralellizability of maze-solving, especially in the case of trees. The study depends on the model of communication between the agents. In the centralized communication model, the agents are allowed to communicate at all times with one another. In the distributed communication model, the agents can communicate only by reading and writing on the walls of the maze. For trees with $n$ nodes and depth $D$, with $k$ robots, the current-best algorithm is in $O\left(\frac{n}{k} + kD\right)$ in the centralized communication model and in $O\left(\frac{n}{\log k} + D\right)$ in the distributed communication model.

== See also ==
- Maze
- Maze generation algorithm
