= Pommerman Challenge =

Artificial intelligence test

The Pommerman Challenge is a multi-agent game to test autonomous artificial intelligence systems.

== Game structure ==
Two-agent team compete against each other on an 11 x 11 board. Each agent can observe only part of the board, and the agents cannot communicate. The goal is to knock down the opponents. Agents place explosives to destroy walls and collect power-ups that appear from those walls, while avoiding death. Game objects can move unpredictably or be moved by an agent.

== Play ==
The game involves real-time decision making. Agents must choose moves in about .1 seconds.

== Algorithms ==
The real-time requirement limits the use of compute-heavy techniques such as Monte Carlo tree search. The branching factor at each move can be as large as 1,296, because all four agents act in each step, choosing among six possibilities. The agents choose by accounting for explosions, which have lifetimes of 10 steps. Explosions derail tree search techniques, as searches with less than 10 levels ignore explosions while deeper searches consider too many choices (given the branching factor).

A hybrid approach uses a limited-depth tree search followed by exploring a deterministic/pessimistic scenario. Limiting the depth keeps the search tree small. The deterministic approach can predict far in the future, by omitting branching. "Good" actions are often those that perform well under pessimistic scenarios, particularly if safety is important. Identifying the worst sequence of positions for an object can suggest where to move it.

After generating pessimistic scenarios, the agent quantifies the survivability of each move, notionally the number of positions in which the agent can then remain safely (without encountering other agents).

== Competitions ==
3 competitions were organized with slightly changing rules during 2018–2019.

=== Online - FFA ===
This round was a warm-up online event, where each competitor controlled only one agent. Results:

- 1st: Agent47Agent by Yichen Gong
- 2nd: aiKiller by Márton Görög

=== NeurIPS 2018 - Team ===
The first Pommerman competition with in-person finals. Results:

- 1st: hakozakijunctions by Toshihiro Takahashi
- 2nd: eisenach by Márton Görög
- 3rd: dypm by Takayuki Osogami

The 3 best performing solutions used online tree search.

=== NeurIPS 2019 - Team Radio ===
The second competition with in-person finals improved communication between teammate agents. Results:

- 1st: Márton Görög
- 2nd: Paul Jasek
- 3rd: Yifan Zhang
