= Terminal node =

Terminal node may mean:

- Leaf node, a node of a tree data structure that has no child nodes.
- Lymph node, a terminal lymph node in the lymphatic system.
