= Aspiration window =

Search heuristic for combinatorial games

An aspiration window is a heuristic used in pair with alpha-beta pruning in order to reduce search time for combinatorial games by supplying a window (or range) around an estimated score guess. Use of an aspiration window allows alpha-beta search to compete in the terms of efficiency against other pruning algorithms.

Alpha-beta pruning achieves its performance by using cutoffs from its original range. Aspiration windows take advantage of this by supplying a smaller initial window, which increases the amount of cutoffs and therefore efficiency.

However, due to search instability, the score may not always be in the window range. This may lead to a costly re-search that can penalize performance. Despite this, popular engines such as Stockfish still use aspiration windows.

The guess that aspiration windows use is usually supplied by the last iteration of iterative deepening.

== See also ==
- Principal variation search

== Sources ==
- Shams, Reza; Kaindl, Hermann; Horacek, Helmut (August 1991). "Using aspiration windows for minimax algorithms" (PDF). IJCAI'91: Proceedings of the 12th International Joint Conference on Artificial Intelligence. 1: 192–197.
