= LMR =

LMR may refer to:

- Lamar (Amtrak station), Colorado, United States; Amtrak station code LMR
- Land mobile radio system
- Last Mountain Railway in Canada
- LeFrak-Moelis Records
- Leominster railway station, England; National Rail station code LMR
- Liverpool and Manchester Railway
- London Midland Region
- Longmoor Military Railway
- Longitudinal magnetic recording
- Lower Mississippi River
- Late Move Reductions
- Levin Minnemann Rudess, an album
