= Candidate move =

In abstract strategy board games, candidate moves are moves which, upon initial observation of the position, seem to warrant further analysis. Although in theory the idea of candidate moves can be applied to games such as checkers, go, and xiangqi, it is most often used in the context of chess.

== History ==
The idea of candidate moves was first put forth by Grandmaster Alexander Kotov in his book Think Like a Grandmaster. In it, Kotov recommended looking for several moves that seemed feasible – the so-called candidate moves – and then analyzing those moves one at a time. Although this idea had been practiced by expert chess players for some time, it had never been explicitly articulated, and was relatively unknown to players at the amateur level.

The idea quickly caught on, and is now considered standard practice among chess players at all levels. Many beginning players are taught about candidate moves as soon as they learn to play the game, and there are numerous references to the idea in other chess books.

== Finding candidate moves ==
Finding the correct candidate moves is often one of the most difficult aspects of becoming a better chess player. Kotov, as well as other teachers, recommend using a system of pattern recognition, looking at the elements of the current position to determine what might be a feasible move. For example, if a player notices that his opponent's king is on the g8 square, and that his knight is on f3, then a candidate move might be Ng5, a fairly common beginning to a sacrifice.

Once a player has found a good number of candidate moves (every position is different, although four to six moves is usually the norm), a player may then begin to systematically analyze these moves. The idea behind candidate moves is to help structure one's analysis and prevent it from becoming jumbled; inexperienced players who do not carefully consider candidate moves will often find themselves jumping between lines of analysis haphazardly.

== Computer chess ==
The ability of humans to find candidate moves remains one of the main differences between them and computers. Although early chess programmers made admirable efforts to make computers able to select candidate moves (see Type A versus Type B programs), they never played particularly well, and were soon supplanted by computers using brute-force algorithms (Shenk, 2006). The addition of alpha–beta algorithms made the latter type even more feasible. Many acknowledged that computers were simply not capable of performing the complex pattern recognition that was required to find appropriate candidate moves, and that it was easier to have computers perform simple exhaustive searches.

Today, most chess programs still rely mainly on brute-force searches, but as search algorithms have improved, today's chess engines seem more and more to be using candidate moves in their analysis. Hydra and AlphaZero, for example, are widely considered to be a "Type B" (candidate move finding) computer.
