= Branching factor =

Number of children at each node of a tree

A red–black tree with branching factor 2

In computing, tree data structures, and game theory, the branching factor is the number of children at each node, the outdegree. If this value is not uniform, an average branching factor can be calculated.

For example, in chess, if a "node" is considered to be a legal position, the average branching factor has been said to be about 35, and a statistical analysis of over 2.5 million games revealed an average of 31. This means that, on average, a player has about 31 to 35 legal moves at their disposal at each turn. By comparison, the average branching factor for the game Go is 250.

Higher branching factors make algorithms that follow every branch at every node, such as exhaustive brute force searches, computationally more expensive due to the exponentially increasing number of nodes, leading to combinatorial explosion.

For example, if the branching factor is 10, then there will be 10 nodes one level down from the current position, 10^{2} (or 100) nodes two levels down, 10^{3} (or 1,000) nodes three levels down, and so on. The higher the branching factor, the faster this "explosion" occurs. The branching factor can be cut down by a pruning algorithm.

The average branching factor can be quickly calculated as the number of non-root nodes (the size of the tree, minus one; or the number of edges) divided by the number of non-leaf nodes (the number of nodes with children).

== See also ==
- k-ary tree
- Outdegree
- Hierarchy
- Hierarchical organization
