= David Levy (chess player) =

Scottish chess player, writer, and entrepreneur (born 1945)

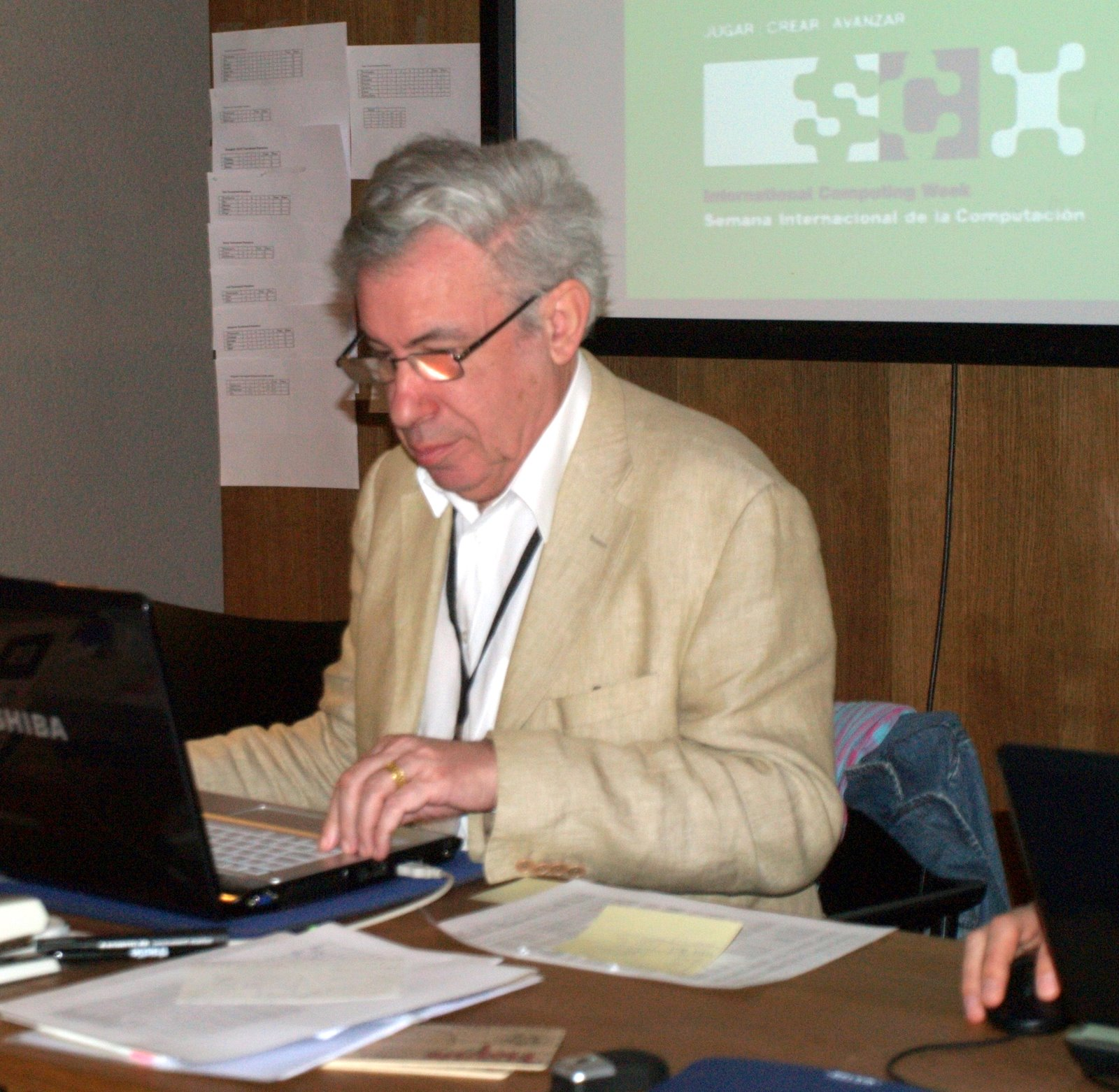
- David Levy at Pamplona 2009 (WCCC – CO – ACGC)

Personal information
- Born: 14 March 1945 (age 81) London, England

Chess career
- Country: Scotland
- Title: International Master (1969)
- Peak rating: 2360 (July 1971)

David Neil Laurence Levy (born 14 March 1945) is an International Master of chess who plays for Scotland, and a businessman. He is noted for his involvement with computer chess and artificial intelligence, and as the founder of the Computer Olympiads and the Mind Sports Olympiads. He has written more than 40 books on chess and computers.

== Life and career ==
Levy was born in London and went to Queen Elizabeth's School, Barnet. He won the London Junior Chess Championship in 1965 and 1966. He won the Scottish Chess Championship in 1968. He tied for fifth place at the 1969 Praia da Rocha Zonal tournament, scoring over two-thirds and thereby obtaining the title of International Master. He played on Board One for the Scottish team at the 1972 Chess Olympiad in Skopje, Yugoslavia, scoring six wins, five draws, and seven losses (47.2%). After many years of inactivity as a tournament player, Levy returned to tournament play to play for the Scottish Senior Team.

Levy became a professional chess writer in 1971. Several of his books were co-written with English Grandmaster Raymond Keene. Levy was married to Keene's sister Jacqueline for 17 years. He has functioned as literary agent for the escaped Great Train robber, Ronald Biggs and claims to have masterminded his escape from British justice.

In 1974, Levy together with Monty Newborn and Ben Mittman organized the first World Computer Chess Championship. In 1978, he co-founded the International Computer Chess Association.

In the late 1970s, Levy consulted with Texas Instruments on the development of the Chess module for the TI-99/4A Home Computer Project and went on to set up Intelligent Software to produce chess software and hardware for a number of companies including Milton Bradley. Intelligent Software would later collapse as a result of its involvement in the failed Enterprise home computer.

In 1997, he funded the team that won the Loebner Prize for the program called "CONVERSE". The prize competition rewards the program that is best able to simulate human communication. Levy entered the contest again in 2009, and won.

From 1986 to 1992 and from 1999 to 2018, he was the president of the International Computer Games Association. He was Chairman of the Rules and Arbitration Committee for the Kasparov vs. Deep Junior chess match in New York City in 2003.

Levy once started a business called Tiger Computer Security with a computer hacker, Mathew Bevan.

Levy also wrote Love and Sex with Robots, published in the United States in 2007 by HarperCollins, and in paperback in 2009 by Duckworth in the UK. It is the commercial edition of his PhD thesis, which he defended successfully on 11 October 2007, at Maastricht University, Netherlands. On 17 January 2008, he appeared on the late night television show The Colbert Report to promote his book. In September 2009, Levy predicted that sex robots would hit the market within a couple of years. He defended his controversial views on the potential future wide use of sex robots by the public, and also by sex offenders, in an interview with The Guardian newspaper in December 2015. Levy has also been working on a range of sexually erotic chatbots, which have been created by a team based in a lab in Malaysia. Levy’s work on human–robot sexual relations attracted controversy in connection with the Love and Sex with Robots conference. The planned 2015 event in Malaysia, which he was due to co-chair, was ruled illegal by the authorities after organisers used the Tourism Malaysia logo in a way that suggested official endorsement.

Levy was brought in to a new company called Retro Computers Ltd, by his friend Clive Sinclair. This company was formed after a meeting with Sinclair and Paul Andrews who conceived the ZX Spectrum Vega games console. This was backed by members of the public on a crowd funding site raising over £150,000 in 2015, and delivered successfully to backers that same year. A second portable console, the ZX Spectrum Vega+, was proposed, and crowd funded again, but two of the four founding directors (Paul Andrews and Chris Smith) left the company in April 2016 before the crowd funding finished. They left citing irreconcilable differences between them and the last remaining director Levy. Levy continued with the company installing two replacement directors, Suzanne Martin and Janko Mrsic-Flogel, both long term associates of Levy. The Vega+ console was originally intended to be delivered to backers in September 2016, but as of August 2017 the device remained unreleased amid claims of "infighting and legal battles". Despite condensed accounts being filed for the company at Companies House no information has been provided to identify the status of funds. In September 2017 the company's bank statements were released showing that by 2017 all money raised via Indiegogo had been spent by RCL with no product to show for it, but calls from the backers for Levy to explain why the company had previously told The Inquirer that the missing funds were "safe" and "ring-fenced" went unanswered. On 23 January 2019 a Petition to wind up the company was filed by Private Planet Limited, owned by Mrsic-Flogel. Liquidators were appointed 4 April 2019 leaving backers empty-handed.

== Computer chess bet ==
In 1968, Levy and artificial intelligence (AI) pioneer John McCarthy were at a party hosted by Donald Michie. McCarthy invited Levy to play a game of chess which Levy won. McCarthy responded that 'you might be able to beat me, but within 10 years there will be a computer program that can beat you.' Levy suggested they bet on it, and Michie agreed to up the ante. Other AI experts signed on later, with the bet total reaching £1,250. In 1973, Levy wrote:

Clearly, I shall win my ... bet in 1978, and I would still win if the period were to be extended for another ten years. Prompted by the lack of conceptual progress over more than two decades, I am tempted to speculate that a computer program will not gain the title of International Master before the turn of the century and that the idea of an electronic world champion belongs only in the pages of a science fiction book.

Researchers expected that a large network of computers would cooperate against Levy, until Chess 3.0, a program written by Larry Atkin, Keith Gorlen, and David Slate of Northwestern University, won the first United States Computer Chess Championship in 1970. Although Chess 4.0 in 1973 and 1974 achieved a United States Chess Federation rating higher than that of the average tournament player, until 1977 no computer program was good enough to pose a serious threat to Levy. In April 1977 he played a two-game match against Slate and Atkin's Chess 4.5, which had done well in human events, including winning the 1977 Minnesota Open, and had defeated Levy in blitz conditions. After Levy won the first game, the second was not played since Levy could not possibly lose the match. On 17 December, Levy played a two-game match against Kaissa; once again Levy won the first game and the match was terminated. In August 1978, Levy played a two-game match against MacHack; this time both games were played, Levy winning 2–0.

The final match necessary for Levy to win the bet also was played in August and September 1978 at the Canadian National Exhibition, against Chess 4.7, the successor to Chess 4.5. Levy won the bet, defeating 4.7 in a six-game match by a score of 4½–1½. The computer scored a draw in game two after getting a completely winning position but being outplayed by Levy in the endgame, and a win in game four—the first computer victory against a human master in a tournament—when Levy essayed the very sharp, dubious Latvian Gambit. He played the gambit after playing the local street player Josef Smolij the night before the game. Levy wrote, "I had proved that my 1968 assessment had been correct, but on the other hand my opponent in this match was very, very much stronger than I had thought possible when I started the bet." He observed that, "Now nothing would surprise me (very much)."

To further stimulate the growth of computer chess, Levy suggested to Omni magazine that he would offer $1,000 to the first program to beat him if they added $4,000 to this, for a total of $5,000. In 1989, the authors of the Deep Thought program won the prize when their program beat Levy.

In 1996, Popular Science asked Levy about Garry Kasparov's impending match against Deep Blue. Levy confidently stated that "...Kasparov can take the match 6 to 0 if he wants to. 'I'm positive, I'd stake my life on it.'" After losing the first game, Kasparov won the match by a score of 4–2. The following year, he lost their historic rematch 2½–3½.

== Rybka controversy ==
On 28 June 2011, David Levy and the International Computer Games Association (ICGA) concluded their investigation and determined that Vasik Rajlich, in programming Rybka, had plagiarised two other chess programs: Crafty and Fruit. According to Levy and the ICGA, Vasik Rajlich failed to comply with the ICGA rule that each computer chess program must be the original work of the entering developer and that those "whose code is derived from or including game-playing code written by others must name all other authors, or the source of such code, in their submission details".

In response to the suspension, Vasik Rajlich was interviewed by Rybka fan Nelson Hernandez, in which he responded to the ICGA's allegations in a statement and answered questions about the controversy and his opinions on it.

In January 2012, ChessBase.com published an article by Dr. Søren Riis. Riis, a computer science professor at Queen Mary University of London, was critical of Levy's and the ICGA's decision, the investigation, the methods on which the investigation was based, and the panel members themselves. ICGA President David Levy and University of Sydney research fellow in mathematics Mark Watkins responded to Riis' publication with their own statements defending the ICGA panel and findings, respectively.

In February 2012, ChessBase published a two-part interview with Levy in which he answered many questions about the ICGA's decision to ban Rybka.

== Bibliography ==
- Keene, R. D. and Levy, D. N. L. Levy, Siegen Chess Olympiad, CHESS Ltd., 1970.
- Keene, Ray and Levy, David, Chess Olympiad 1972, Doubleday, 1973, ISBN 0-385-06925-1.
- Levy, David, Gligoric's Best Games 1945–1970, R.H.M. Press, 1972. ISBN 0-89058-015-4.
- Levy, David, The Sicilian Dragon, Batsford, 1972.
- Levy, David, How Fischer Plays Chess, R.H.M. Press, 1975. ISBN 0-923891-29-3.
- Levy, D.N.L., Howard Staunton 1810–74, The Chess Player, Nottingham, 1975, ISBN 4-87187-812-0
- Levy, David, Chess and Computers, Computer Science Press, Potomac, Maryland, 1976. ISBN 0-914894-02-1.
- Levy, David, 1975—US Computer Chess Championship, Computer Science Press, Potomac, Maryland.
- Levy, David, 1976—US Computer Chess Championship, Computer Science Press, Potomac, Maryland.
- Levy, David, Benko Counter-Gambit, B.T. Batsford Ltd, 1978. ISBN 0-7134-1058-2
- Levy, David and Newborn, Monroe, More Chess and Computers: The Microcomputer Revolution, The Challenge Match, Computer Science Press, Potomac, Maryland, and Batsford, London, 1980. ISBN 0-914894-07-2.
- Computer Gamesmanship: Elements of Intelligent Game Design, by David Levy, 1983, Simon & Schuster, ISBN 0-671-49532-1.
- The Chess Computer Handbook ISBN 0-7134-4220-4
- Heuristic Programming in Artificial Intelligence (with D. F. Beal), 1989. ISBN 0-7458-0778-X
- How Computers Play Chess (with Monroe Newborn) ISBN 4-87187-801-5
- Computer Games I ISBN 4-87187-802-3
- Computer Games II ISBN 4-87187-803-1
- Computer Chess Compendium ISBN 4-87187-804-X
- How to Play the Sicilian Defence (with Kevin O'Connell) ISBN 4-87187-806-6
- Instant Chess (with Kevin O'Connell) ISBN 4-87187-807-4
- How to Play the King's Indian Defence (with Kevin O'Connell) ISBN 4-87187-808-2
- Play Chess Combinations and Sacrifices ISBN 4-87187-809-0
- Oxford Encyclopedia of Chess Games, Volume 1, 1485–1866 (with Kevin O'Connell), 1980, Oxford University Press, Oxford. ISBN 0-923891-54-4
- Korchnoi's Chess Games (with Kevin O'Connell) ISBN 4-87187-810-4
- Sacrifices in the Sicilian ISBN 4-87187-811-2
- Levy, David, Karpov's Collected Games, Robert Hale & Company, 1975. ISBN 0-7091-4943-3.
