= Carl Ebeling =

American computer scientist (born 1950)

- Born: William Henry Carl Ebeling; January 9, 1950 (age 76)

Academic background
- Education: Wheaton College; Southern Illinois University Carbondale; Carnegie-Mellon University
- Thesis: All the right moves: a VLSI architecture for chess (1986)
- Doctoral advisor: Bob Sproull

Academic work
- Institutions: University of Washington
- Doctoral students: Scott Hauck

William Henry Carl Ebeling (born January 9, 1950) is an American computer scientist and professor. His recent interests include coarse-grained reconfigurable architectures of integrated circuits.

== Education and career ==
He earned his B.S. Degree in physics from Wheaton College in 1971. He earned MS in computer science from Southern Illinois University Carbondale (1976).

Under Bob Sproull, he earned his Ph.D. in computer science from Carnegie-Mellon University (1986). From 1986 to 1988, he was a member of the team which created the chess machine HiTech. HiTech was the highest ranked chess machine for some time in mid-1980s until it was surpassed by Deep Blue. Ebeling wrote All The Right Moves – A VLSI Architecture for Chess, a book published through The MIT Press, in 1987. A review by Don Beal of London University called it "well written and easy to read," and accessible to a wide audience despite the technical subject.

In 1986 he joined the Department of Computer Science & Engineering at University of Washington, becoming a full professor since 1997. He was chairman of the 1997 proceedings of the Association for Computing Machinery, titled the FPGA97: 1997 ACM/SIGDA International Symposium on Field Programmable Gate Arrays when published in February of that year. In 2010, he was in the program committee of the 2010 International Conference on Field Programmable Technology. From 2011 to 2012, he was with the Paul G. Allen School of Computer Science & Engineering. In late 2012, he left his academic position for a position at Altera.

Among his projects are Gemini and Gemini2, open source programs for graph isomorphism used for netlist comparison in layout versus schematic IC verification.

== Awards ==
Ebeling's Ph.D. thesis All the Right Moves: A VLSI Architecture for Chess earned him the 1986 Doctoral Dissertation Award from the Association for Computing Machinery. The American Association for Artificial Intelligence awarded Ebeling the Pioneer in Computer Chess award in 1989. His work on HiTech was recognized with the Allen Newell Award for Research Excellence in 1997.

In 2011 he was inducted as a Fellow of the Association for Computing Machinery.

== Personal life ==
He met his wife Lynne while in the Peace Corps in Liberia, and for some years traveled with his family.

== See also ==
- List of fellows of the Association for Computing Machinery
