= Kriventsov =

Kriventsov (Russian: Кривенцо́в), female form Kriventsova (Russian: Кривенцо́ва), is a Russian surname.

Notable people with this surname include:

- Stanislav Kriventsov (born 1973), Russian chess master
- Valeriy Kriventsov (born 1973), Ukrainian footballer
