= IBM Deep Thunder =

IBM meteorological research project

Deep Thunder is a research project by IBM that aims to improve short-term local weather forecasting through the use of high-performance computing. It is part of IBM's Deep Computing initiative that also produced the Deep Blue chess computer.

Deep Thunder is intended to provide local, high-resolution weather predictions customized to weather-sensitive specific business operations. For example, it could be used to predict the wind velocity at an Olympic diving platform, destructive thunderstorms, and combined with other physical models to predict where there will be flooding, damaged power lines and algal blooms. The project is now headquartered at IBM's Thomas J. Watson Research Center in Yorktown Heights, New York.

== History ==
The Deep Thunder project is headed by Lloyd Treinish, who joined IBM in 1990, after working for 12 years at NASA's Goddard Space Flight Center.

The project began in 1995 as an outgrowth of a project designed to help provide accurate weather forecasts for the 1996 Atlanta Olympic Games. In collaboration with the National Oceanic and Atmospheric Administration, IBM scientists built one of the first parallel processing supercomputers to be used for weather modeling, based on the IBM RS/6000 SP. It was installed at the National Weather Service office in Peachtree City, Georgia, in 1996, where it ran for several months and produced multiple forecasts daily. After a few years of development, the team set up an implementation in New York City in 2001 to test the project. The group is currently working on establishing the Rio de Janeiro operations center.

The name Deep Thunder arose after the IBM Deep Blue system played and defeated the world chess champion Garry Kasparov in May, 1997. In the following November, a journalist used the name Deep Thunder in an article, which stuck with the developers. Current members of Deep Thunder are Lloyd Treinish, Anthony Praino, Campbell Watson and Mukul Tewari.

== Technology ==
Deep Thunder uses a 3D telescoping grid where data from one model feeds into another and is verified with historical data. For example, they start with a global model from NOAA, and as they zoom in the resolution decreases exponentially, down to models with resolutions of 1 kilometer, and sometimes as small as 1 meter. Using this method, IBM can cut down on the amount of processing required. IBM uses many sources of data to feed Deep Thunder, including public satellite sources, and many other private sources, as well as whatever local sensors and data a location, may have.

The Watson computer system will be used to generate the Deep Thunder weather forecasts. Input data will be collected from over 200,000 Weather Underground personal weather stations, weather satellite data, smartphone barometer and data from other sources.

== Applications ==
=== Utility Companies ===
IBM worked with a North American utility company that has over 90,000 poles, wires, and transformers to develop a prediction service that can pinpoint where incoming storms will bring down trees and power lines. The service can be used to call in the needed number of repair crews and station them near where the damage will occur, drastically decreasing downtime.

=== Agriculture ===
Deep Thunder could be used to determine optimal times to plant, irrigate, and harvest crops, based on the dynamic environmental conditions of individual farm locations. Precision agriculture using Deep Thunder could lead to better price points for crops by saving water, allocating labor more effectively, and improving supply chain efficiency. Using these methods of predictive weather farming, crop losses from the weather can be cut by over 25%. The island nation of Brunei is working with Deep Thunder to develop precision weather forecast models to increase rice production.

=== In The Olympics ===
Deep Thunder was used during the 1996 Atlanta Olympic Games to accurately predict that there would be no rain during the closing ceremony.

=== The Jefferson Project ===
The Jefferson Project at Lake George (New York) is a global example of sustained protection of freshwater ecosystems. The project uses Deep Thunder to predict the weather at an unprecedented 333 m resolution, simulating complex airflow patterns over the lake that are crucial to lake currents and nutrient cycling.

=== New York ===
New York City was the first city to test a full-scale implementation of Deep Thunder. IBM is experimenting with using a mobile app to distribute location-specific predictions and issue alerts. Data from the app can be used by maintenance crews to determine if wind levels are too high to work, or it could be used to get a weather forecast at a certain address.

=== Rio de Janeiro ===
IBM is currently expanding the project to Rio de Janeiro to predict floods, and anticipate where storms might trigger mudslides. The city is collaborating with IBM on a multimillion-dollar plan to improve emergency responsiveness, by providing comprehensive information about rainfall estimates, wind speed and direction, probabilities of landslides and floods to responders. It is expected to be utilized during the 2014 FIFA World Cup and 2016 Summer Olympics.

=== Dublin, Ireland ===
The Dublin City Council is working with IBM to help make Dublin, Ireland, the third city in the world to implement the Deep Thunder forecasting model in an attempt to predict and issue warnings about incoming flash floods that are impacting businesses and homeowners.
