= Sex and Love (disambiguation) =

Sex and Love is a 2014 album by Enrique Iglesias.

Sex and Love may also refer to:

- Sex and love addiction, disputed condition that allegedly leads to the subject's repetition of specific thought or behavior patterns against the previously established intentions of the subject
- Sex and Love Addicts Anonymous, a twelve-step program for people recovering from sex addiction and love addiction

== See also ==
- Sex (disambiguation)
- Love (disambiguation)
- Love and Sex (disambiguation)
