= HiTech =

Chess machine

- Developer: Carl Ebeling, Hans J. Berliner, Murray Campbell, Gordon Goetsch, Andy Palay, Larry Slomer
- Type: Chess machine
- Release date: c. 1985

HiTech, also referred to as Hitech, is a chess machine built at Carnegie Mellon University under the direction of World Correspondence Chess Champion Hans J. Berliner. Members of the team working on HiTech included Berliner, Murray Campbell, Carl Ebeling, Gordon Goetsch, Andy Palay, and Larry Slomer. In 1988, it became the first computer system to beat a grandmaster.

== History ==
=== Development and specs ===
It was designed by Carl Ebeling, a student, from 1986 to 1988, under professor Hans Berliner at Carnegie Mellon University. Members of the team working on HiTech included Berliner, Murray Campbell, Carl Ebeling, Gordon Goetsch, Andy Palay, and Larry Slomer.

Berliner had also created a computer program to play backgammon called BKG 9.8, which beat Luigi Villa in 1979, and in the process became "the first computer program to beat a world champion in any game." According to the New York Times, "this research led, in 1984, to a chess program called HiTech." The computer used an algorithm developed by Berliner to narrow the choices when selecting a move, called B*, or B-star. The algorithm would evaluate decision trees and assign nodes with an "optimistic" or "pessimistic" score, with the aim of finding a path that was sufficient to solve the problem, rather than perfect.

HiTech's name refers to a chess-playing program called TECH that was developed at Carnegie Mellon. The team combined a Sun computer equipped with a custom processor called "the searcher" by Berlin. It runs three programs: a user interface, a task controller, and an "oracle," with the latter consisting of a large catalogue of chess openings and variations. The searcher component contains a microprocessor and a number of hardware modules to perform tasks such as generating and evaluating moves. These activities are coordinated by the microprocessor. The move generator consisted of 64 VLSI chips, with one for each square on the chessboard. In 1988, Hitech could scan 165,000 positions a second.

The hardware, which was custom, could analyze over 200,000 moves per second. The computer has a nearly six-foot-tall mainframe. HiTech was one of two competing chess projects at Carnegie Mellon; the other was ChipTest. ChipTest became the predecessor of IBM's Deep Thought and Deep Blue).

=== Early matches ===
HiTech won the 1985 and 1989 editions of the North American Computer Chess Championship. From September 1985 to July 1988, it used the same hardware, while its standing in the US chess community rose from being in the top 2% to the top .5%. Berliner described this change as a result of "using better management of the resources that have been available." In November 1985, the Associated Press reported that over five months of play, it had earned the rank of master and achieved the highest rating ever given a chess machine. At that time, its developers argued it was 50% faster than any other chess-playing computer systems. The computer began competing on the chess circuit, only going against humans, in 1986. By 1987, the computer ranked 190th in the United States, and was the only computer among the top 1,000 chess players.

ChipTest was invited to play in the 1987 American Open, but the team did not enter due to an objection by the HiTech team, also from Carnegie Mellon University. HiTech and ChipTest shared some code, and Hitech was already playing in the tournament. The two teams became rivals.

HiTech was the first computer to be rated over 2400 in chess, which is the senior master USCF rating level.

=== Championships ===
In 1987, it won the Pennsylvania State Chess Championship, scoring 4.5 points out of 5 after a four-way tie. HiTech had an overall performance score of 2559, considered a high Senior Master rating. However, an interpretation of the rules denied HiTech the money prize, the State Title, and trophy, as only a resident could earn the title. Hitech won the Pennsylvania State Chess Championship twice, winning again in July 1988. It won with a score of 4.5 - 0.5, beating international master Edward Formanek in the process. Rules had changed since 1987, allowing a computer to win the title, but not the trophy or prize money. However, Professor Formanek gave Hitech the trophy he had been awarded as the highest human competitor.

In May 1988, Hitech was described by TIME as being able to compete in hotel competitions remotely. The main computer remained at Pittsburgh, while a contraption TIME called "an ungainly-looking brute," would be operated by Berliner and Carl Ebeling at the tournament. The remote Hitech relied on its phone line connection to Pittsburgh to communicate moves. This meant that whenever the hotel would use their phone line, the computer would need to be relinked via a phone call.

In 1988 HiTech defeated GM Arnold Denker 3½-½ in a match in New York City. Hitech won the four-game match, the first a draw and the last three wins, marking the first time a grandmaster was beaten by a chess program. According to the New York Times at the time, most experts agreed Denker, however, was "badly off form," as a largely retired individual at 74 years old. Denker called Hitech's play an impressive achievement.

=== Retirement ===
In 1988, Berliner stated that he and his associates at Carnegie-Mellon were working on an improved model of Hitech, with three years of work projected before it debuted. At the time, Hitech could scan 165,000 positions a second. Berliner stated that "speed alone is not the most important thing. Hitech scans in a dumb sort of way. It has to go through every possible position. A smarter machine might operate only on 100,000 scans a second, but it will confine those scans to positions germane to the situation. That is what we call a smart scan."

HiTech has been included in exhibits by the Computer History Museum. The Carnegie Mellon University Libraries began holding the computer in 2022, as part of the university's Robotics Project. It was donated from the collection of Chris Atkeson.
