= Thomas Anantharaman =

American computer scientist

Thomas S. Anantharaman
- Education: Indian Institute of Technology (BHU) Varanasi (B.Tech., 1982); Carnegie Mellon University (PhD, 1990)
- Known for: ChipTest and Deep Thought (precursors to Deep Blue); Bayesian inference for NP-complete problems; Biostatistics and Optical Mapping
- Scientific career
- Fields: Computer science; Statistics; Bioinformatics
- Institutions: Carnegie Mellon University; BioNano Genomics
- Thesis: A Statistical Study of Selective Min-Max Search in Computer Chess (1990)

Thomas S. Anantharaman is a computer statistician specializing in Bayesian inference approaches for NP-complete problems. He is best known for his work with Feng-hsiung Hsu from 1985 to 1990 on the Chess playing computers ChipTest and Deep Thought at Carnegie Mellon University which led to his 1990 PhD Dissertation: "A Statistical Study of Selective Min-Max Search in Computer Chess". This work was the foundation for the IBM chess-playing computer Deep Blue which beat world champion Garry Kasparov in 1997.

== Life and career ==
Anantharaman obtained a B.Tech. degree in Electronics in 1982 from the Institute of Technology, Banaras Hindu University (now Indian Institute of Technology (BHU) Varanasi). He got (in 1977) IIT-JEE rank (AIR) # 2. Anantharaman went to USA and joined Carnegie Mellon University as a PhD student where he worked on the chess playing computers ChipTest and DeepThought with Feng-hsiung Hsu. Anantharaman received his PhD degree in 1990 and joined the field of biotechnology and Feng-hsiung Hsu joined IBM to design the Deep Blue IBM super-computer, which defeated Garry Kasparov in the historic chess match.

In 1985, Carnegie Mellon University graduate students Feng-hsiung Hsu, Anantharaman, Murray Campbell and Andreas Nowatzyk used spare chips they'd found to put together a chess-playing machine that they called ChipTest. By 1987, the machine, integrating some innovative ideas about search strategies, had become the reigning computer chess champion. A successor, Deep Thought, using two special-purpose chips, plus about 200 off-the-shelf chips, working in parallel, achieved grandmaster-level play.

Following this work, Anantharaman focused his attentions into the field of biostatistics and the application of Bayesian methods to the analysis of single molecule Optical Mapping technologies. He is currently a Senior Bioinformatics Software Engineer at BioNano Genomics, San Diego, California.
