= Pennsylvania State Chess Federation =

- Type: State Affiliate
- Founded: 1939
- Location: Pennsylvania
- Country: United States
- Website: Official Website

The Pennsylvania State Chess Federation (PSCF) is the official Pennsylvania affiliate of the United States Chess Federation (US Chess).

PSCF is a 501(c)(3) non-profit organization. PSCF sponsors about 20 annual state championship events, held throughout the state. The Pennsylvania State Championship rotates between the eastern, central and western regions of the state each year. PSCF publishes a quarterly newsletter, The Pennswoodpusher.

PSCF was founded in 1939, in Pittsburgh, Pennsylvania under the leadership of William M. Byland. PSCF affiliated immediately with US Chess, which was founded the same year, and has been the official state affiliate for Pennsylvania ever since.

In 1943, the PSCF State Championship was the first championship event in USCF history to be paired with the Swiss system. The chief director of that event was George Koltanowski.

Currently the highest-ranking member is Grandmaster Alexander Shabalov. The state has two Grandmasters — Shabalov, and Bryan G. Smith.

The current PSCF president is Tom M. Martinak. PSCF Presidents:

- 2002–present: Tom M. Martinak
- 1978–2002: Ira Lee Riddle
- 1939–1977: William M. Byland

PSCF State Champions 2001–present:

- 2016: Grant Xu
- 2015: Grant Xu
- 2014: Peter Minear, Rodion Rubenchik, Ilya Shvartsman
- 2013: Peter Minear
- 2012: Daniel Malkiel
- 2011: Peter Minear
- 2010: Thomas Bartell, Alisa Melekhina
- 2009: Mark Heimann
- 2008: Peter Minear
- 2007: Bryan Smith
- 2006: Bryan Norman, Mark Heimann
- 2005: Mark Eidemiller, Bryan Norman
- 2004: Edward Formanek
- 2003: Stanislav Kriventsov
- 2002: Rodion Rubenchik, Zakhar Fayvinov, Elvin Wilson, Tom Martinak
- 2001: Stanislav Kriventsov, Matthew Traldi

PSCF State Champions 1981–2000:

- 2000: Stanislav Kriventsov
- 1999: Stanislav Kriventsov
- 1998: Edward Formanek, Rodion Rubenchik, Albert Bingaman, Jr., Marty Frank
- 1997: Edward Formanek
- 1996: Wesley Ward
- 1995: John Hathaway, Jr.
- 1994: Alexander Shabalov
- 1993: Igor Khmelnitsky, Edward Formanek, Andrew Rea
- 1992: Ruben Shocron, Brent Schwab
- 1991: Mark Eidemiller
- 1990: Vivek Rao, Stephen Rakowsky
- 1989: HiTech
- 1988: HiTech
- 1987: Mark Eidemiller, Craig Jones, Albert Bingaman, Jr.
- 1986: Karl Dehmelt, Ruben Shocron, Michael Shahade
- 1985: Karl Dehmelt, William Atkinson
- 1984: Edward Formanek
- 1983: Igor Ivanov
- 1982: Albert Bingaman, Jr.
- 1981: Boris Baczynskyj

PSCF State Champions 1961–1980:

- 1980: Alex Dunne
- 1979: Anatoly Dozorets
- 1978: John Fitzpatrick
- 1977: John Fitzpatrick
- 1976: Tim Taylor
- 1975: Paul Cornelius
- 1974: Harvey Bradlow
- 1973: Jon Jacobs
- 1972: Michael Shahade
- 1971: Michael Shahade
- 1970: Michael Shahade
- 1969: Robert Bornholz
- 1968: Bruce Alberston
- 1967: Arnold Chertkof
- 1966: Richard Abrams
- 1965: Richard Abrams
- 1964: Clarence Kalenian
- 1963: Jeffrey Harris
- 1962: Robert Bornholz
- 1961: Attilio Di Camillo

PSCF State Champions 1939–1960:

- 1960: Attilio Di Camillo
- 1959: Joseph Schaffer
- 1958: Max Cohen
- 1957: Robert Bornholz
- 1956: Hermann Hesse
- 1955: Charles Kalme
- 1954: Joseph Schaffer
- 1953: Robert Sobel
- 1952: Donald McClelland
- 1951: William Ruth
- 1950: Thomas Gutekunst
- 1949: William Byland
- 1948: Paul Deitz
- 1947: Attilio Di Camillo
- 1946: Attilio Di Camillo
- 1945: Irving Heitner
- 1944: Hermann Hesse
- 1943: Thomas Gutekunst
- 1942: William Steckel
- 1941: Hermann Hesse
- 1940: L. W. Gardner
- 1939: William Steckel, Hermann Hesse
