= Kevin O'Connell (disambiguation) =

Kevin O'Connell may refer to:

- Kevin O'Connell (born 1985), American football player and coach
- Kevin O'Connell (chess player) (born 1949), Irish chess master
- Kevin O'Connell (politician), member of the Maine House of Representatives
- Kevin O'Connell (racing driver) (born 1967), American stock car racing driver
- Kevin O'Connell (sound mixer), (born 1957), American sound re-recording mixer
