= Love and Sex =

Love and Sex may refer to:

- Love & Sex, 2000 American film written and directed by Valerie Breiman
- Love & Sex (album), 2014 album by Plan B
- "Love & Sex, Pt. 2", a 2014 single by Joe

== See also ==
- Love and Sex with Robots, a 2007 book by David Levy
- Anarchism and issues related to love and sex
- Amor & Sexo
