= Michael Valvo =

American chess player (1942–2004)

Personal information
- Born: April 19, 1942 Albany, New York
- Died: September 18, 2004 (aged 62) Chanhassen, Minnesota

Chess career
- Country: United States
- Title: International Master (1980)
- Peak rating: 2560 (July 1978)

Michael Joseph Valvo (April 19, 1942, in New York – September 18, 2004, in Chanhassen, Minnesota) was an American chess player who held the title of International Master.

== Career ==
By 1962, he was one of the top blitz players in the United States. He won the 1963 U.S. Intercollegiate Championship.

A native of Albany, New York and a graduate of Columbia University, Valvo was a member of the U.S. team that competed in the 11th Student Olympiad in Kraków, Poland, in 1964. His teammates included William Lombardy, Raymond Weinstein, Charles Kalme, and Bernard Zuckerman. The Americans finished fourth, behind the USSR, Czechoslovakia and Hungary.

By 1976, Valvo had essentially dropped out of tournament chess and his rating was no longer published in the USCF rating lists, until Bill Goichberg and Jose Cuchi invited him to a futurity tournament. Valvo did well, earning a rating of 2440. However, Professor Arpad Elo refused to award Valvo the rating he had earned, because Elo had never heard of Valvo and suspected that the tournament had been rigged. This matter was debated at the 1978 FIDE Congress in Buenos Aires and FIDE voted to give Valvo his 2440 rating. Valvo quickly proved that he really was a 2440 strength player and earned the International Master title.

Valvo never played in the U.S. Chess Championship, but he was to make his mark in computer chess, which became his primary focus. At every World Computer Chess Championship from the early 1980s until his death, Valvo was the organizer, moderator, commentator or acted in some official capacity. He also played a two-game play by email match against Deep Thought, winning both games.

Mike Valvo died of a heart attack. He was eulogized by long-time friend, colleague and computer scientist Ken Thompson in the December 2004 issue of the International Computer Games Association Journal.
