= Edward W. Formanek =

American mathematician and chess player

Personal information
- Born: May 6, 1942 (age 84)

Chess career
- Title: International Master (1977)
- Peak rating: 2430 (January 1976)

Edward William Formanek (born May 6, 1942) is an American mathematician and chess player. He is a professor emeritus of mathematics at Pennsylvania State University, and a FIDE International Master in chess.

== Mathematical career ==
Formanek earned his Ph.D. in 1970 from Rice University, under the supervision of Stephen M. Gersten. He joined the Penn State faculty in 1978, and retired in 2009.

In 1972, Formanek was one of two mathematicians to independently discover the central polynomials, which have applications to polynomial identity rings. With Vesselin Drensky, Formanek is the author of the book Polynomial Identity Rings (Birkhäuser, 2004).

In 2012, he became one of the inaugural fellows of the American Mathematical Society.

== Chess career ==
Formanek became a FIDE International Master in 1977.

He has won the Pennsylvania State Championship five times, in 1984, 1993, 1997, 1998, and 2004. However, his most famous result from this series may be in 1988, when he led the tournament going into the last round but was defeated by computer program HiTech, becoming the first IM to lose a game to a computer. Later the same year HiTech would also defeat grandmaster Arnold Denker.
