= Feng-hsiung Hsu =

American computer scientist and electrical engineer (born 1959)

- 許峰雄
- Born: January 1, 1959 (age 67); Keelung, Taiwan
- Education: National Taiwan University (BS); Carnegie Mellon University (PhD)
- Known for: Designing Deep Blue
- Awards: Grace Murray Hopper Award (1991)
- Scientific career
- Fields: Computer science
- Workplaces: IBM
- Thesis: Large-scale parallelization of alpha-beta search: An algorithmic and architectural study with computer chess (1989)
- Doctoral advisor: Hsiang-Tsung Kung

Feng-hsiung Hsu (Chinese: 許峰雄; pinyin: Xǔ Fēngxióng; born January 1, 1959) (nicknamed Crazy Bird) is a Taiwanese-American computer scientist and electrical engineer. His work led to the creation of the Deep Thought chess computer, which led to the first chess playing computer to defeat grandmasters in tournament play and the first to achieve a certified grandmaster-level rating.

Hsu was the architect and the principal designer of the IBM Deep Blue chess computer. He was awarded the 1991 ACM Grace Murray Hopper Award for his contributions in architecture and algorithms for chess machines. He is the author of the book Behind Deep Blue: Building the Computer that Defeated the World Chess Champion.

== Early life and education ==
Hsu was born in Keelung, Taiwan. As a child, he played Xiangqi, chess, and Go.

After graduating from National Taiwan University with a Bachelor of Science (B.S.) in electrical engineering, he came to the United States. He started his graduate work at Carnegie Mellon University in the field of computer chess in the year 1985. In 1988 he was part of the "Deep Thought" team that won the Fredkin Intermediate Prize for Deep Thought's grandmaster-level performance. In 1989 he joined IBM to design a chess-playing computer and received a Ph.D. in computer science with honors from Carnegie Mellon University. He was the recipient of the 1990 Mephisto Best-Publication Award for his doctoral dissertation.

== Career ==
In 1991, the Association for Computing Machinery awarded Hsu a Grace Murray Hopper Award for his work on Deep Blue. In 1996, the supercomputer lost to world chess champion Garry Kasparov. After the loss, Hsu's team prepared for a re-match. During the re-match with Kasparov, the supercomputer had doubled the processing power it had during the previous match. On May 11, 1997, Kasparov lost the sixth and final game, and, with it, the match (2½–3½).

Prior to building the supercomputer Deep Blue that defeated Kasparov, Hsu worked on many other chess computers. He started with ChipTest, a simple chess-playing chip, based on a design from Unix-inventor Ken Thompson's Belle, and very different from the other chess-playing computer being developed at Carnegie Mellon, HiTech, which was developed by Hans Berliner and included 64 different chess chips for the move generator instead of the one in Hsu's series. Hsu went on to build the successively better chess-playing computers Deep Thought, Deep Thought II, and Deep Blue Prototype.

In 2003, Hsu joined Microsoft Research Asia, in Beijing. In 2007, he stated the view that brute-force computation has eclipsed humans in chess, and it could soon do the same in the ancient Asian game of Go. This came to pass nine years later in 2016.

The chess computer HiTech was donated to the Computer History Museum by Hsu.

== Bibliography ==
- Behind Deep Blue: Building the Computer that Defeated the World Chess Champion. Princeton University Press, 2002. (ISBN 0-691-09065-3). Review by ChessBase.com

== See also ==
- Arimaa
- Deep Blue versus Garry Kasparov
- Deep Blue - Kasparov, 1996, Game 1
- Deep Blue - Kasparov, 1997, Game 6
- Game Over: Kasparov and the Machine
- ChipTest, the first in the line of chess computers co-developed by Feng-hsiung Hsu
- Deep Thought, the second in the line of chess computers co-developed by Feng-hsiung Hsu
- Deep Blue, another chess computer co-developed by Feng-hsiung Hsu, being the first computer to win a chess match against the world champion
- List of pioneers in computer science
