= Sicilian Defence, Alapin Variation =

Alapin Variation
Position: a8 black rook, b8 black knight, c8 black bishop, d8 black queen, e8 black king, f8 black bishop, g8 black knight, h8 black rook, a7 black pawn, b7 black pawn, d7 black pawn, e7 black pawn, f7 black pawn, g7 black pawn, h7 black pawn, c5 black pawn, e4 white pawn, c3 white pawn, a2 white pawn, b2 white pawn, d2 white pawn, f2 white pawn, g2 white pawn, h2 white pawn, a1 white rook, b1 white knight, c1 white bishop, d1 white queen, e1 white king, f1 white bishop, g1 white knight, h1 white rook
- Moves: 1.e4 c5 2.c3
- ECO: B22
- Named after: Semyon Alapin
- Parent: Sicilian Defence

The Alapin Variation is a variation of the Sicilian Defence that begins with the moves:

1. e4 c5
2. c3

White plays 2.c3 with the intention of supporting a later d4, which would establish a strong central pawn centre. Black most often replies with 2...d5 or 2...Nf6.

The opening is named after the Russian master Semyon Alapin (1856–1923). For many years, it was not held in high regard, since 2...d5 was thought to allow Black easy equality. Today, the Alapin is considered to be one of the most solid and respectable Anti-Sicilians, and it is championed by grandmasters such as Evgeny Sveshnikov, Eduardas Rozentalis, Sergei Tiviakov, Duško Pavasovič, and Dražen Sermek. It has been played by World Champions Viswanathan Anand, Garry Kasparov, Anatoly Karpov, Veselin Topalov, and Vladimir Kramnik, and Deep Blue played the Alapin Variation against Kasparov in their 1996 match. Magnus Carlsen played it in his championship tiebreaker against Rameshbabu Praggnanandhaa in the 2023 FIDE World Cup.

The Alapin is also seen in deferred form, particularly when Black chooses an unusual second move after 2.Nf3. For example, after 2.Nf3 a6 or 2.Nf3 Qc7, 3.c3 is often seen, since neither ...a6 nor ...Qc7 are particularly useful moves against the Alapin.

== Main variations ==
=== 2...Nf6 ===
Position: a8 black rook, b8 black knight, c8 black bishop, d8 black queen, e8 black king, f8 black bishop, h8 black rook, a7 black pawn, b7 black pawn, d7 black pawn, e7 black pawn, f7 black pawn, g7 black pawn, h7 black pawn, f6 black knight, c5 black pawn, e4 white pawn, c3 white pawn, a2 white pawn, b2 white pawn, d2 white pawn, f2 white pawn, g2 white pawn, h2 white pawn, a1 white rook, b1 white knight, c1 white bishop, d1 white queen, e1 white king, f1 white bishop, g1 white knight, h1 white rook

Alapin Variation 2...Nf6

The main line in current practice is 2...Nf6 3.e5 Nd5 and can also arise if Black declines the Smith–Morra Gambit (1.e4 c5 2.d4 cxd4 3.c3 Nf6 4.e5 Nd5).

White has a number of options including 4.d4, 4.Nf3, 4.g3 and 4.Bc4.

=== 2...d5 ===
Position: a8 black rook, b8 black knight, c8 black bishop, d8 black queen, e8 black king, f8 black bishop, g8 black knight, h8 black rook, a7 black pawn, b7 black pawn, e7 black pawn, f7 black pawn, g7 black pawn, h7 black pawn, c5 black pawn, d5 black pawn, e4 white pawn, c3 white pawn, a2 white pawn, b2 white pawn, d2 white pawn, f2 white pawn, g2 white pawn, h2 white pawn, a1 white rook, b1 white knight, c1 white bishop, d1 white queen, e1 white king, f1 white bishop, g1 white knight, h1 white rook

Alapin Variation 2...d5

This is the main alternative to 2...Nf6 for Black. The usual continuation is 3.exd5 Qxd5, a line known as the Barmen Defense. 3.e5 may transpose to the Advance Variation of the French Defence if Black responds with 3...e6, but Black can also develop his c8-bishop before playing e6. This leads to a favorable version of the French for Black, since the bishop is no longer hemmed in by the pawn chain. If White plays 3.exd5, 3...Nf6 is also possible, but it is not clear whether Black receives sufficient compensation for the pawn.

The main options revolve around:

- 4.d4 Nc6 and now 5.dxc5 or 5.Nf3
- 4.d4 Nf6 5.Nf3 when after both 5...e6 and 5...Bg4 White can try a number of different moves.

=== 2...e6 ===
Position: a8 black rook, b8 black knight, c8 black bishop, d8 black queen, e8 black king, f8 black bishop, g8 black knight, h8 black rook, a7 black pawn, b7 black pawn, d7 black pawn, f7 black pawn, g7 black pawn, h7 black pawn, e6 black pawn, c5 black pawn, e4 white pawn, c3 white pawn, a2 white pawn, b2 white pawn, d2 white pawn, f2 white pawn, g2 white pawn, h2 white pawn, a1 white rook, b1 white knight, c1 white bishop, d1 white queen, e1 white king, f1 white bishop, g1 white knight, h1 white rook

Alapin Variation 2...e6

This is Black's most solid response, preparing 3...d5. It is closely related to the French Defence, to which it often transposes. White can transpose to the Advance Variation of the French Defence with 3.d4 d5 4.e5. Alternatively, White can transpose to a sort of Tarrasch French with 3.d4 d5 4.Nd2, or try to demonstrate a slight advantage with 3.d4 d5 4.exd5 exd5 5.Be3.

=== 2...d6 ===
Position: a8 black rook, b8 black knight, c8 black bishop, d8 black queen, e8 black king, f8 black bishop, g8 black knight, h8 black rook, a7 black pawn, b7 black pawn, e7 black pawn, f7 black pawn, g7 black pawn, h7 black pawn, d6 black pawn, c5 black pawn, e4 white pawn, c3 white pawn, a2 white pawn, b2 white pawn, d2 white pawn, f2 white pawn, g2 white pawn, h2 white pawn, a1 white rook, b1 white knight, c1 white bishop, d1 white queen, e1 white king, f1 white bishop, g1 white knight, h1 white rook

Alapin Variation 2...d6

This is a sharp response. Black often offers a gambit with 3.d4 Nf6 4.dxc5 Nc6 (4...Nxe4?? 5.Qa4+) 5.cxd6 Nxe4. White can instead play quietly, however, with 3.d4 Nf6 4.Bd3, occupying the centre and maintaining a spatial advantage.

== Other tries ==
=== 2...e5 ===
Position: a8 black rook, b8 black knight, c8 black bishop, d8 black queen, e8 black king, f8 black bishop, g8 black knight, h8 black rook, a7 black pawn, b7 black pawn, d7 black pawn, f7 black pawn, g7 black pawn, h7 black pawn, c5 black pawn, e5 black pawn, e4 white pawn, c3 white pawn, a2 white pawn, b2 white pawn, d2 white pawn, f2 white pawn, g2 white pawn, h2 white pawn, a1 white rook, b1 white knight, c1 white bishop, d1 white queen, e1 white king, f1 white bishop, g1 white knight, h1 white rook

Alapin Variation 2...e5

This move makes it hard for White to play d4, but seriously weakens the d5-square. Play usually continues 3.Nf3 Nc6 4.Bc4, with a solid edge for White.

== See also ==
- List of chess openings
- List of chess openings named after people
