= Deep Blue versus Kasparov, 1996, Game 1 =

Computer vs. human chess match

Animation of the game

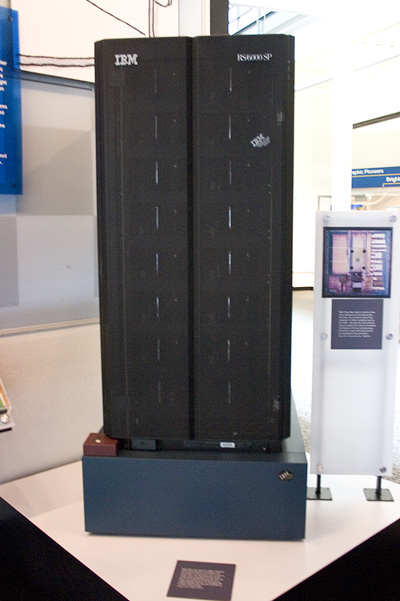
IBM's Deep Blue
(model) = White

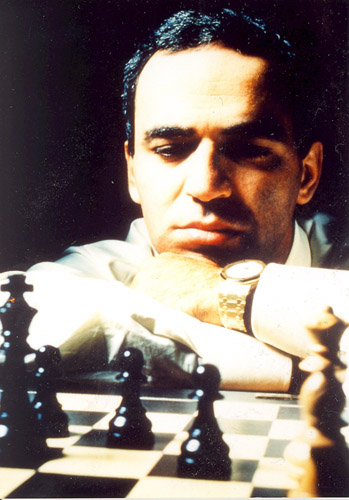
World Champion Garry Kasparov = Black

Deep Blue–Kasparov, 1996, Game 1 is a famous chess game in which a computer played against a human being. It was the first game played in the 1996 Deep Blue versus Garry Kasparov match, and the first time that a chess-playing computer defeated a reigning world champion under normal chess tournament conditions (in particular, standard time control; in this case 40 moves in two hours).

== Overview ==
Deep Blue was a computer developed by IBM to beat grandmaster Garry Kasparov, the top chess player in the world at the time according to Elo ratings. Playing White, Deep Blue won this first game in the match on February 10, 1996, in Philadelphia, Pennsylvania. Kasparov rebounded over the next five games, winning three and drawing two, to soundly beat the machine in the 1996 match.

== The game ==
White: Deep Blue Black: Kasparov Opening: Sicilian Defense, Alapin Variation (ECO B22)

1. e4 c5 2. c3

It is more common to play 2.Nf3, but Kasparov has deep experience with that line, so White's opening book goes in a different direction. The IBM team determined the opening moves played by Deep Blue.

Position: a8 black rook, e8 black king, h8 black rook, a7 black pawn, b7 black pawn, f7 black pawn, g7 black pawn, h7 black pawn, c6 black knight, e6 black pawn, f6 black knight, d5 black queen, h5 black bishop, b4 black bishop, d4 white pawn, e3 white bishop, f3 white knight, h3 white pawn, a2 white pawn, b2 white pawn, e2 white bishop, f2 white pawn, g2 white pawn, a1 white rook, b1 white knight, d1 white queen, f1 white rook, g1 white king

Position after 10...Bb4

2... d5 3. exd5 Qxd5 4. d4 Nf6 5. Nf3 Bg4 6. Be2 e6 7. h3 Bh5 8. 0-0 Nc6 9. Be3 cxd4 10. cxd4 Bb4 (diagram)

A more common move here is Be7. This was a new approach by Kasparov, developing the bishop in an unusual way. If 11.Nc3 Qa5 12.Qb3 then the game transposes into a game Kasparov previously played against Kramnik. The merit of the new move is debated. After this move, the computer left its opening book and began calculating its moves.

11. a3 Ba5 12. Nc3 Qd6 13. Nb5 Qe7 14. Ne5! Bxe2 15. Qxe2 0-0 16. Rac1 Rac8 17. Bg5

Black now has a problem with the pinned knight on f6.

17... Bb6 18. Bxf6 gxf6

Kasparov avoids ...Qxf6? because White would gain material with 19.Nd7 by forking the queen and rook. Note that Kasparov's king is now far more exposed.

19. Nc4!

Black cannot take the d4-pawn due to Qg4+.

19... Rfd8 20. Nxb6! axb6 21. Rfd1!? f5 22. Qe3!?

Two speculative moves by Deep Blue. 21.Qg4+ Kh8 22.Rcd1 was better, bringing White's queen and queen rook to attack Black's kingside.

Position: c8 black rook, d8 black rook, g8 black king, b7 black pawn, f7 black pawn, h7 black pawn, b6 black pawn, c6 black knight, e6 black pawn, f6 black queen, b5 white knight, f5 black pawn, d4 white pawn, a3 white pawn, e3 white queen, h3 white pawn, b2 white pawn, f2 white pawn, g2 white pawn, c1 white rook, d1 white rook, g1 white king

Position after 22...Qf6

22... Qf6 (diagram) 23. d5!

This type of pawn sacrifice is typical of Kasparov's style of play. Kasparov commented that he might have played 23.d5 himself in this position, since it hurts Black's pawn structure and opens up the board, and Black's exposed king suggests that there is probably a way to exploit the result. Kasparov has been attacking White's d-pawn, and the computer wisely decides to advance it for an attack instead of trying to defend it.

23... Rxd5 24. Rxd5 exd5 25. b3! Kh8?

Kasparov attempts to prepare a counterattack by preparing to move his rook to the g-file, but it will not work. Burgess suggests that 25...Ne7 26.Rxc8+ would have been better, though White would still have some advantage. Keene suggests that 25...Rd8! 26.Qxb6 Rd7 was Black's best try, strengthening his passed d-pawn and queenside.

26. Qxb6 Rg8 27. Qc5

Black was threatening 27...Qg5 forking g2 and the white rook.

27... d4? 28. Nd6 f4 29. Nxb7

This is a very materialistic move, typical of computers at the time; White grabs a pawn for a small gain in material. Deep Blue has not identified any threat of checkmate from Black, however, so it simply acquires the material.

29... Ne5 30. Qd5

30.Qxd4?? would lose to 30...Nf3+. If White tries 30.Nd6 with the idea of 31.Qxe5 winning the knight, Black gets decisive pressure on the g-file after 30...Nf3+ 31.Kh1 Qg6. Kasparov later commented on his opponent: "My late game attack would intimidate many players into making a mistake or two, but not this one."

Position: g8 black rook, h8 black king, b7 white knight, f7 black pawn, h7 black pawn, f6 black queen, d5 white queen, e5 black knight, d4 black pawn, a3 white pawn, b3 white pawn, f3 black pawn, g3 white pawn, h3 white pawn, f2 white pawn, c1 white rook, g1 white king

Position after 31.g3. The seemingly crushing move 31...Qf4 doesn't work, so Kasparov plays 31...Nd3 instead.

30... f3? 31. g3 (see diagram) Nd3

It seems as though Black could annihilate White with 31...Qf4, threatening both ...Qxc1+ and 32.Kh2 Rxg3!! winning. But instead White could play 32.Rc8!! and turn the tables on Black. Kasparov may have seen this and planned 32...Qg5 33.h4 Rxc8!! 34.hxg5 Rc1+ 35.Kh2 Ng4+ 36.Kh3 Nxf2+ and mate next move, however Deep Blue could then spoil everything with 33.Rc5.

32. Rc7 Re8??

Kasparov makes a huge blunder, thinking he can muster an attack on White's king. Deep Blue realizes this is not a real threat and continues to gobble material.

33. Nd6 Re1+ 34. Kh2 Nxf2 35. Nxf7+ Kg7

35...Qxf7 36.Qd8+ and White wins.

36. Ng5+ Kh6 37. Rxh7+ 1–0

After 37...Kg6 38.Qg8+ Kf5 39.Nxf3, Black cannot meet the simultaneous threats of 40.Nxe1, 40.Rf7, and 40.Qd5+. Kasparov resigned.

Position: h7 white rook, f6 black queen, h6 black king, d5 white queen, g5 white knight, d4 black pawn, a3 white pawn, b3 white pawn, f3 black pawn, g3 white pawn, h3 white pawn, f2 black knight, h2 white king, e1 black rook

Final position after 37.Rxh7+

== See also ==
- Deep Blue versus Kasparov, 1997, Game 6
- List of chess games
