= Murray Campbell =

Canadian computer scientist

- Education: Carnegie Mellon University University of Alberta
- Occupation: Computer scientist
- Years active: 1980s-
- Employer: IBM

Murray Campbell is a Canadian computer scientist known for being part of the team that created Deep Blue; the first computer to defeat a world chess champion.

== Career ==
=== Chess computing ===
Around 1986, he and other students at Carnegie Mellon began working on Chip Test, a chess computer. He was then a member of the teams that developed chess machines: HiTech and a project to culminate in Deep Blue.

Murray Campbell worked on Deep Thought at Carnegie Mellon University. Deep Thought was a side project, and caught the attention of IBM.

He afterwards joined IBM's team for Deep Blue, with Scientific American describing him as the IBM team's best chess player in 1996.

He started working on Deep Blue in 1989, he served as the AI expert. In the match where Deep Blue beat world chess champion Garry Kasparov, in February 1997, Murray was there as an IBM computer scientist, and he moved the pieces as instructed by the computer program. Deep Blue in that match became the first computer to defeat the reigning world chess champion. Kasparov had won an earlier match the previous year. (Based on text taken from a newsletter by Mike Oettel, of the Shriver Center at UMBC.)

In 1997, IBM turned down Kasparov's request for a rematch with Deep Blue, with the researchers moving on to other research areas, such as IBM Watson.

Campbell visited UMBC for a speech called "IBM's Deep Blue: Ten Years After" on February 5, 2007.

=== IBM ===
In 2012, he was a Senior Manager in the Business Analytics and Mathematical Sciences Department at the IBM Thomas J. Watson Research Center in Yorktown Heights, New York, USA. In March 2016, he continued to serve as a scientist for IBM, as a senior manager in IBM's Cognitive Computing division, which handles the Watson AI platform. Campbell has been involved in surveillance projects related to petroleum production, disease outbreak, and financial data. In 2017, he was a research staff member in the AI Foundations group within IBM T.J. Watson Research Center's Cognitive Computing organization.

== Personal life ==
Campbell himself played chess at near National Master strength in Canada during his student days, but has not played competitively for more than 20 years. His peak Elo rating was around 2200.

== Honors and awards ==
In the North American Computer Chess Championship, he was a member of winning teams in 1985 (HiTech), 1987 (ChipTest), 1988 (Deep Thought), 1989 (HiTech and Deep Thought), 1990 (Deep Thought), 1991 (Deep Thought) and 1994 (Deep Thought).

He won the 1989 World Computer Chess Championship as part of the winning team (Deep Thought).

Campbell shared the $100,000 Fredkin Prize with Feng-hsiung Hsu and A. Joseph Hoane Jr. in 1997. The prize was awarded for developing the first computer (Deep Blue) to defeat a reigning world chess champion in a match.

Campbell received the Allen Newell Research Excellence Medal in 1997, which cited his contributions to Deep Blue (first computer to defeat a world chess champion), Deep Thought (first Grandmaster level computer) and HiTech (first Senior Master level computer).

In 2008, he was recognized by the Association for Computing Machinery when they designated him as an ACM Distinguished Member. Campbell was elected Fellow of the Association for the Advancement of Artificial Intelligence in 2012 for "significant contributions to computer game-playing, especially chess, and the associated improvement in public awareness of the AI endeavor."
