= Amor & Sexo =

Amor & Sexo may refer to:

- Amor e Sexo, a Brazilian television series aired on Rede Globo
- Amor y sexo, a 1964 Mexican film

== See also ==
- Love and Sex
