= Jacqueline Eales =

British academic historian

Jacqueline Eales is a professor of early modern history at Canterbury Christ Church University and was appointed president of the Historical Association in 2011. She was educated at the University of London, where under the supervision of Conrad Russell she completed a PhD on the Harleys of Brampton Bryan and the English Civil War, which was later published under Cambridge University Press. She then taught at the University of London and the University of Kent, before taking up a post at what was then Canterbury Christ Church University College, now Canterbury Christ Church University. Her research interests also extend into the realm of women's history, which has led her to make a significant contribution to the Oxford Dictionary of National Biography, correcting the very masculine bias of the original dictionary. Her recent work, Women in Early Modern England, 1500–1700, published under UCL press has helped open up this under explored area of research. As a testament to Eales' ability as a researcher, writer and an inspiring teacher she received a national teaching award in 2006.
