= Love and Sex with Robots =

2007 book by David Levy

- Author: David Levy
- Language: English
- Publication date: 2007
- Publication place: United States
- Media type: Print
- ISBN: 0061359750

Love and Sex with Robots by David Levy, first published in 2007, is a book about the future development of sex robots: robots that will have sex with humans. Levy claims that this practice will be routine by 2050.

== Reception ==
Kathleen Richardson of the Campaign Against Sex Robots wrote a position paper arguing "that Levy’s proposal shows a number of problems, firstly his understanding of what prostitution is and secondly, by drawing on prostitution as the model for human-robot sexual relations, Levy shows that the sellers of sex are seen by the buyers of sex as things and not recognised as human subjects." She goes on to argue that "this legitimates a dangerous mode of existence where humans can move about in relations with other humans but not recognise them as human subjects in their own right."
