= ChipTest =

1985 chess-playing computer

ChipTest was a 1985 chess playing computer built by Feng-hsiung Hsu, Thomas Anantharaman and Murray Campbell at Carnegie Mellon University. It is the predecessor of Deep Thought which in turn evolved into Deep Blue.

== History ==
ChipTest was based on a special VLSI-technology move generator chip developed by Hsu. ChipTest was controlled by a Sun-3/160 workstation and capable of searching approximately 50,000 moves per second. Hsu and Anantharaman entered ChipTest in the 1986 North American Computer Chess Championship, and it was only partially tested when the tournament began. It lost its first two rounds, but finished with an even score.

In August 1987, ChipTest was overhauled and renamed ChipTest-M, M standing for microcode. The new version had eliminated ChipTest's bugs and was ten times faster, searching 500,000 moves per second and running on a Sun-4 workstation. ChipTest-M won the North American Computer Chess Championship in 1987 with a 4–0 sweep.

ChipTest was invited to play in the 1987 American Open, but the team did not enter due to an objection by the HiTech team, also from Carnegie Mellon University. HiTech and ChipTest shared some code, and Hitech was already playing in the tournament. The two teams became rivals.

Designing and implementing ChipTest revealed many possibilities for improvement, so the designers started on a new machine. Deep Thought 0.01 was created in May 1988 and the version 0.02 in November the same year. This new version had two customized VLSI chess processors and it was able to search 720,000 moves per second. With the "0.02" dropped from its name, Deep Thought won the World Computer Chess Championship with a perfect 5–0 score in 1989.

== See also ==
- Computer chess
- Deep Thought, the second in the line of chess computers developed by Feng-hsiung Hsu
- Deep Blue (chess computer), another chess computer developed by Feng-hsiung Hsu, being the first computer to win a chess match against the world champion
