= Deep Blue versus Kasparov, 1997, Game 6 =

Chess game between human and computer

Animation of the game

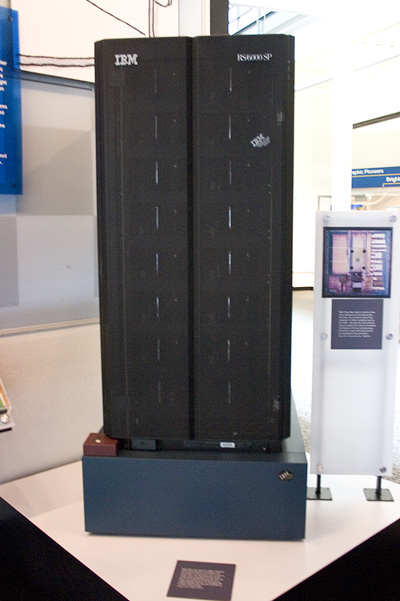
IBM's Deep Blue
(model) = White

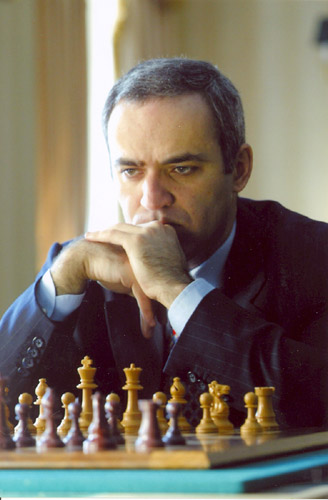
World Champion Garry Kasparov = Black

Game 6 of the Deep Blue–Kasparov rematch, played in New York City on 11 May 1997 and starting at 3:00 p.m. EDT, was the final chess game in the 1997 rematch between Deep Blue and Garry Kasparov.

Deep Blue had been further upgraded from the previous year's match and was unofficially nicknamed "Deeper Blue". Before this game, the score was tied at 2½–2½: Kasparov had won the first game, lost the second, and drawn games three, four, and five (despite having advantageous positions in all three).

The loss marked the first time that a computer had defeated a reigning World Champion in a match of several games. The fact that Kasparov had lasted only 19 moves in a game lasting barely more than an hour attracted considerable media attention.

== The game ==
White: Deep Blue Black: Kasparov Opening: Caro–Kann Defense, Steinitz Variation (ECO B17)

1. e4 c6

Somewhat atypically, Kasparov plays the solid Caro–Kann Defense. In later matches against computers, he opted for 1...e5 or the sharp Sicilian Defense (1...c5), his usual choice against human opponents.

Position: a8 black rook, c8 black bishop, d8 black queen, e8 black king, f8 black bishop, g8 black knight, h8 black rook, a7 black pawn, b7 black pawn, d7 black knight, e7 black pawn, f7 black pawn, g7 black pawn, h7 black pawn, c6 black pawn, g5 white knight, d4 white pawn, a2 white pawn, b2 white pawn, c2 white pawn, f2 white pawn, g2 white pawn, h2 white pawn, a1 white rook, c1 white bishop, d1 white queen, e1 white king, f1 white bishop, g1 white knight, h1 white rook

Position after 5.Ng5

2. d4 d5 3. Nc3 dxe4 4. Nxe4 Nd7 5. Ng5 (diagram)

This relatively recent innovation breaks a classic opening principle ("don't move the same piece twice in the opening") but puts pressure on the weak f7-square. Kasparov himself had played this move as White in at least three earlier games.

5... Ngf6 6. Bd3 e6 7. N1f3 h6? (diagram)

Position: a8 black rook, c8 black bishop, d8 black queen, e8 black king, f8 black bishop, h8 black rook, a7 black pawn, b7 black pawn, d7 black knight, f7 black pawn, g7 black pawn, c6 black pawn, e6 black pawn, f6 black knight, h6 black pawn, g5 white knight, d4 white pawn, d3 white bishop, f3 white knight, a2 white pawn, b2 white pawn, c2 white pawn, f2 white pawn, g2 white pawn, h2 white pawn, a1 white rook, c1 white bishop, d1 white queen, e1 white king, h1 white rook

Position after 7...h6?

A strange choice by Kasparov, one of the most theoretically knowledgeable players in chess history. It has been suggested that this was a blunder—Kasparov may have mixed up his opening moves, playing ...h6 one move too early. The standard continuation was 7...Bd6 8.Qe2 h6 9.Ne4 Nxe4 10.Qxe4, as seen in Kasparov–Kamsky (1994) and Kasparov–Epishin (1995), among others. The upcoming sacrifice is well-known in theory, and Kasparov must have been aware of it. (Some reports even claim he once wrote an article supporting 8.Nxe6 as a refutation.)

Feng-Hsiung Hsu, system architect of Deep Blue, suggests that it may have been a deliberate "anti-computer" move. Objectively, the move may be acceptable, although the resulting position is extremely tough for a human player to defend. White's response is very strong, but computer programs Kasparov was familiar with could not properly play Nxe6—some were even specifically forbidden from attempting it because they lost too easily. Hsu suggests Kasparov expected Deep Blue to either sacrifice the knight and struggle, or retreat and lose a tempo.

8. Nxe6!

The computer is aided by having this knight sacrifice programmed into its opening book. This move had been played previously in a number of high-level games, with White achieving strong results. As an indicator of how much computer chess progressed after this match, modern engines (even without books) correctly evaluate Nxe6 as best. At the time, however, it was assumed that only the opening book allowed Deep Blue to find it. White's compensation for the sacrificed material was not obvious enough for computers of that era to find independently.

8... Qe7?

Instead of immediately taking the knight, Kasparov pins it to the king to give his king a square on d8. Many annotators criticized this move, however, suggesting he should have taken the knight right away. Although the black king would require two moves to reach d8 after 8...fxe6 9.Bg6+ Ke7, the queen could then be placed on the superior c7-square.

9. 0-0

White castles—now 9...Qxe6?? would lose to 10.Re1, pinning and winning Black's queen. Black must now take the knight or be a pawn down.

Position: a8 black rook, c8 black bishop, d8 black king, f8 black bishop, h8 black rook, a7 black pawn, b7 black pawn, d7 black knight, e7 black queen, g7 black pawn, c6 black pawn, e6 black pawn, f6 black knight, g6 white bishop, h6 black pawn, d4 white pawn, f4 white bishop, f3 white knight, a2 white pawn, b2 white pawn, c2 white pawn, f2 white pawn, g2 white pawn, h2 white pawn, a1 white rook, d1 white queen, f1 white rook, g1 white king

Position after 11.Bf4

9... fxe6 10. Bg6+ Kd8 11. Bf4 (diagram)

If Black’s bishop were on d6 instead of f8, White would not be able to play this move. For the sacrificed knight, White's bishops dominate the position. Black, having moved his king, can no longer castle, his queen blocks his own bishop, and he struggles to develop his pieces or utilize the extra knight.

11... b5?

The first new move of the game, and Deep Blue must now start thinking independently. Kasparov's idea is to gain space on the queenside and prevent c2–c4. His move has been criticized, however, by Schwartzman, Seirawan, and Rajlich, as weakening the queenside pawn structure and inviting White to open lines.

12. a4 Bb7

Keeping lines closed with 12...b4 was considered mandatory according to Keene, although then 13.c4 would severely cramp Black's position.

13. Re1 Nd5 14. Bg3 Kc8 15. axb5 cxb5 16. Qd3 Bc6 17. Bf5

White is piling pressure onto Black’s e6-pawn and plans to invade with the rooks. Kasparov cannot hold onto all his extra material and must surrender his queen for a rook and bishop.

17... exf5 18. Rxe7 Bxe7 19. c4 1–0

Black resigns. The white queen will soon invade via c4 or f5. After Re1, White will have a decisive advantage. One sample continuation: 19...bxc4 20.Qxc4 Nb4 (20...Kb7 21.Qa6#) 21.Re1 Kd8 22.Rxe7 Kxe7 23.Qxb4+.

Position: a8 black rook, c8 black king, h8 black rook, a7 black pawn, d7 black knight, e7 black bishop, g7 black pawn, c6 black bishop, h6 black pawn, b5 black pawn, d5 black knight, f5 black pawn, c4 white pawn, d4 white pawn, d3 white queen, f3 white knight, g3 white bishop, b2 white pawn, f2 white pawn, g2 white pawn, h2 white pawn, a1 white rook, g1 white king

Final position after 19.c4

After the game, Kasparov accused the Deep Blue team of cheating (i.e., having human masters assist the computer). Although Kasparov wanted a rematch, IBM declined and discontinued the Deep Blue project.

== See also ==
- Deep Blue versus Kasparov, 1996, Game 1
- List of chess games
