= Kevin O'Connell (chess player) =

Irish chess player (born 1949)

Personal information
- Born: August 28, 1949 (age 77) London, England

Chess career
- Country: Ireland
- Title: FIDE Master (2006)
- Peak rating: 2360 (July 1993)

Kevin John O'Connell (born 28 August 1949 in London, England) is an Irish chess master. He is the author of 28 books on chess, hundreds of magazine articles and a couple of thousand newspaper columns, mostly on chess but also on computing and sports psychology. Although he did head the Irish players on the rating list at the beginning of 1993, played in one Olympiad (1998) and won a few minor tournaments (e.g. Dublin 1993), he is best known as an author, organizer and coach.

He was awarded the titles of International Arbiter in 1998, FIDE Master in 2003 and FIDE Senior Trainer in 2010. He earned his MSc, with distinction, in Sports Science from Essex University in 1998. He was Ireland's delegate to FIDE 1977–2010, President of FIDE Zone 1 (1978–1994), Chairman of FIDE's Computer Chess Committee (1982–1990). He was a member of FIDE's Qualification Commission since 1978, he was Chairman (1990–1994) and Chairman of the Titles and Ratings Committee (1994–2002). He is Honorary Life Member of the Irish Chess Union 2002. He was Chairman of Appeals Committee, Chess Olympiad, Yerevan 1996 and Chief Arbiter of the first European Union Chess Championship, Cork 2005. He is an experienced chess coach of both teams (Great Britain team at the Chess Olympiad for the Blind, Pula 1974, Irish Women's team at the Chess Olympiad, Elista 1998) and individuals (including GM Nicholas Pert, World U-18 Champion 1998).

He originated, with David Levy, the Intelligent Chess Display system which, by automatically sensing moves played on a chessboard and transferring that information to a computer system, then generating a graphical display which can be shown by large screen projection, has enabled hundreds of major chess events to be presented as spectator events. This system was introduced in London in 1986. "Revolutionizing chess as a spectator sport," Garry Kasparov.

== Books ==
- The Games of Robert J. Fischer, Robert Wade and O'Connell, Batsford 1972, 2nd ed. 1972, reprinted 1973, First limp edition 1981, Reprinted 1985, 1981, 1989, Second edition (The Complete Games of Bobby Fischer) 1992
- Les parties d'echecs de Bobby Fischer, Payot (Paris) 1974, 1993 ISBN 2-228-15180-7 (Tome 1, 1974), ISBN 2-228-15190-4 (Tome 2, 1974), ISBN 2-228-88669-6 (1993)
- Todas las Partidas de Fischer (desde 1955 hasta 1973), Bruguera (Barcelona) 1973 ISBN 84-02-03359-8
- How to Play the Sicilian Defence Levy & O'Connell, Batsford 1978, 2nd ed. 1987 ISBN 4-87187-806-6
- Wie spielt mann Sizilianisch? Rau (Düsseldorf) 1979 ISBN 3-7919-0189-3
- Comment jouer la défense Sicilienne, Grasset (Paris) 1983
- Oxford Encyclopedia of Chess Games, Volume 1 1485-1866, Levy & O'Connell, Oxford University Press 1981 ISBN 0-923891-54-4
- Bird's Opening, O'Connell, The Chess Player, 1983, ISBN 0-906042-05-4
