= Scott Hauck =

American electrical engineer

Scott Hauck is an electrical engineer from the University of Washington in Seattle. He was named a Fellow of the Institute of Electrical and Electronics Engineers (IEEE) in 2016 for his contributions to field-programmable gate array-based systems.
