= Stanislav Kriventsov =

Canadian chess player and coach (born 1973)

Stan Kriventsov
Personal information
- Born: Stanislav Germanovich Kriventsov; 2 November 1973 (age 52) Moscow, Russia

Chess career
- Country: Canada
- Title: International Master (2002)
- Peak rating: 2449 (October 2005)

Stanislav Germanovich Kriventsov (Russian: Станислав Кривенцов; born 2 November 1973, in Moscow, Russia) is a Canadian chess International Master and chess coach who resides in the United States. Between 1997 and 2007, he was a regular participant in American chess tournaments and has won over 60 United States Chess Federation Grand Prix tournaments, including four Pennsylvania state championships. Kriventsov has played in four US Chess Championships.

Kriventsov has a Ph.D. degree in electrical engineering with a specialization in power electronics from Penn State University, which he obtained in 2004. He worked as an adjunct faculty member at Tulane University in New Orleans, Louisiana, between 2004 and 2007, where he also received an M.S. degree in computer science in 2007. Since 2021, he has worked at Google as a software engineer.

Between 2007 and 2018, Kriventsov was a professional online poker player specializing in mid-stakes cash games. He has played and cashed in several live poker tournaments, with total live winnings of $88,882.
