= North American Computer Chess Championship =

Computer chess championship held from 1970 to 1994

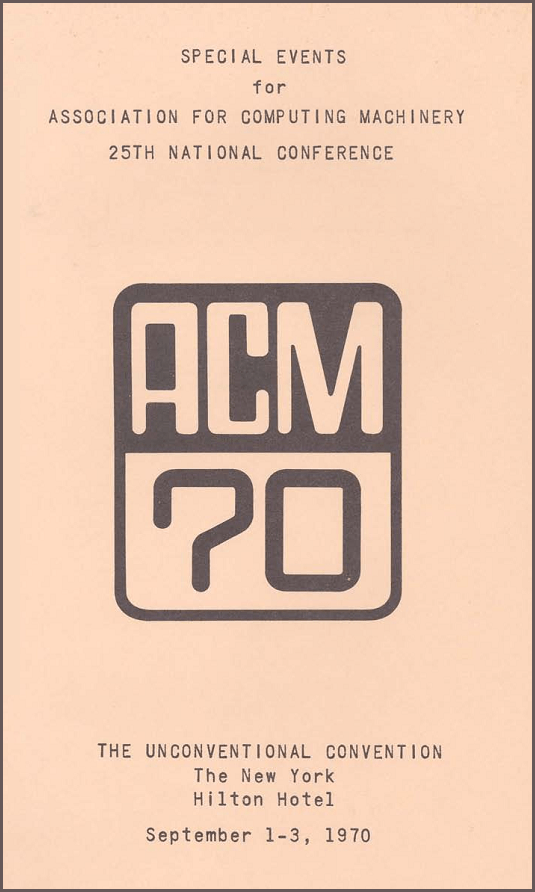
The special events for ACM 1970 included the first championship.

The North American Computer Chess Championship was a computer chess championship held from 1970 to 1994. It was organised by the Association for Computing Machinery and by Monty Newborn, professor of computer science at McGill University. It was one of the first computer chess tournaments. The 14th NACCC was also the World Computer Chess Championship. The event was canceled in 1995 as Deep Blue was preparing for the first match against world chess champion Garry Kasparov, and never resumed.

Event #	Year	Location	Winner
1	1970	New York City	Chess 3.0
2	1971	Chicago	Chess 3.0
3	1972	Boston	Chess 3.0
4	1973	Atlanta	Chess 3.5
5	1974	San Diego	Ribbit
6	1975	Minneapolis	Chess 4.4
7	1976	Houston	Chess 4.5
8	1977	Seattle	Chess 4.6
9	1978	Washington, D.C.	Belle
10	1979	Detroit	Chess 4.9
11	1980	Nashville	Belle
12	1981	Los Angeles	Belle
13	1982	Dallas	Belle
14	1983	New York City	Cray Blitz
15	1984	San Francisco	Cray Blitz
16	1985	Denver	HiTech
17	1986	Dallas	Belle
18	1987	Dallas	ChipTest-M
19	1988	Orlando, Florida	Deep Thought
20	1989	Reno, Nevada	HiTech and Deep Thought
21	1990	New York City	Deep Thought
22	1991	Albuquerque	Deep Thought II
23	1993	Indianapolis	Socrates II
24	1994	Cape May, New Jersey	Deep Thought II
