= Deep Thought (chess computer) =

1988 chess-playing computer

Deep Thought was a computer designed to play chess. Deep Thought was initially developed at Carnegie Mellon University and later at IBM. It was second in the line of chess computers developed by Feng-hsiung Hsu, starting with ChipTest and culminating in Deep Blue. In addition to Hsu, the Deep Thought team included Thomas Anantharaman, Mike Browne, Murray Campbell and Andreas Nowatzyk. Deep Thought became the first computer to beat a grandmaster in a regular tournament game when it beat Bent Larsen in 1988, but was easily defeated in both games of a two-game match with Garry Kasparov in 1989 as well as in a correspondence match with Michael Valvo.

It was named after Deep Thought, a fictional computer in Douglas Adams' series, The Hitchhiker's Guide to the Galaxy. The naming of chess computers has continued in this vein with Deep Blue, Deep Fritz, Deep Junior, etc.

Deep Thought won the North American Computer Chess Championship in 1988 and the World Computer Chess Championship in the year 1989, and its rating, according to the USCF was 2551.

== See also ==
- Computer chess
