= Deep Blue versus Garry Kasparov =

1996 and 1997 chess matches

Deep Blue vs. Kasparov

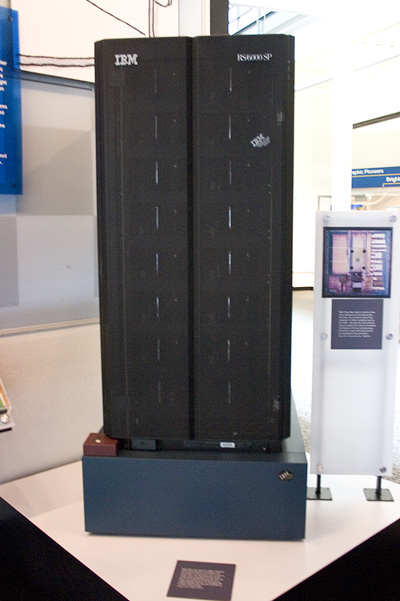
Deep Blue
IBM chess computer

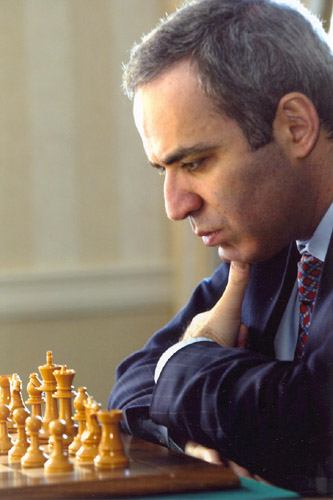
Garry Kasparov
World Chess Champion

First match
- February 10–17, 1996: held in Philadelphia, Pennsylvania
- Result: Kasparov–Deep Blue (4–2)
- Record set: First computer program to defeat a world champion in a classical game under tournament regulations

Second match (rematch)

- May 3–11, 1997: held in New York City, New York
- Result: Deep Blue–Kasparov (3½–2½)
- Record set: First computer program to defeat a world champion in a match under tournament regulations

Garry Kasparov, then-world champion in chess, played a pair of six-game matches against Deep Blue, a supercomputer by IBM. Kasparov won the first match, held at the Pennsylvania Convention Center in Philadelphia in 1996, by 4–2. Deep Blue won a 1997 rematch, held at the Equitable Center in New York City, by 3½–2½. The second match was the first defeat of a reigning world chess champion by a computer under tournament conditions, and was the subject of a documentary film, Game Over: Kasparov and the Machine.

== Summary ==
The 1996 match
| Game # | White | Black | Result |
|---|---|---|---|
| 1 | Deep Blue | Kasparov | 1–0 |
| 2 | Kasparov | Deep Blue | 1–0 |
| 3 | Deep Blue | Kasparov | ½–½ |
| 4 | Kasparov | Deep Blue | ½–½ |
| 5 | Deep Blue | Kasparov | 0–1 |
| 6 | Kasparov | Deep Blue | 1–0 |
Result: Kasparov–Deep Blue: 4–2

The 1997 rematch
| Game # | White | Black | Result |
|---|---|---|---|
| 1 | Kasparov | Deep Blue | 1–0 |
| 2 | Deep Blue | Kasparov | 1–0 |
| 3 | Kasparov | Deep Blue | ½–½ |
| 4 | Deep Blue | Kasparov | ½–½ |
| 5 | Kasparov | Deep Blue | ½–½ |
| 6 | Deep Blue | Kasparov | 1–0 |
Result: Deep Blue–Kasparov: 3½–2½

== 1996 match ==
=== Game 1 ===
Deep Blue–Kasparov, 1996, rd 1

Position: h7 white rook, f6 black queen, h6 black king, d5 white queen, g5 white knight, d4 black pawn, a3 white pawn, b3 white pawn, f3 black pawn, g3 white pawn, h3 white pawn, f2 black knight, h2 white king, e1 black rook

Final position after 37.Rxh7+

February 10. The first game began with the Sicilian Defence, Alapin Variation. The first game of the 1996 match was the first game to be won by a chess-playing computer against a reigning world champion under normal chess tournament conditions, and in particular, classical time controls.

Deep Blue vs. Kasparov, Sicilian Defence, Alapin Variation (ECO B22)
1.e4 c5 2.c3 d5 3.exd5 Qxd5 4.d4 Nf6 5.Nf3 Bg4 6.Be2 e6 7.h3 Bh5 8.0-0 Nc6 9.Be3 cxd4 10.cxd4 Bb4 11.a3 Ba5 12.Nc3 Qd6 13.Nb5 Qe7 14.Ne5 Bxe2 15.Qxe2 0-0 16.Rac1 Rac8 17.Bg5 Bb6 18.Bxf6 gxf6 19.Nc4 Rfd8 20.Nxb6 axb6 21.Rfd1 f5 22.Qe3 Qf6 23.d5 Rxd5 24.Rxd5 exd5 25.b3 Kh8 26.Qxb6 Rg8 27.Qc5 d4 28.Nd6 f4 29.Nxb7 Ne5 30.Qd5 f3 31.g3 Nd3 32.Rc7 Re8 33.Nd6 Re1+ 34.Kh2 Nxf2 35.Nxf7+ Kg7 36.Ng5+ Kh6 37.Rxh7+ 1–0 (Resignation)

=== Game 2 ===
Kasparov–Deep Blue, 1996, rd 2

Position: c7 black king, b5 white bishop, d4 black pawn, f4 white pawn, h4 white pawn, e3 black bishop, g3 white pawn, f1 white king

Final position after 73.Bb5

February 11. The second game transposed to an open lines of the Catalan Opening. Kasparov played in what could be called a preemptive style, blocking all Deep Blue's development attempts. The game lasted for 73 moves but eventually Deep Blue's operator had to resign the game. Though an opposite-colored bishops ending tends to be drawish, Kasparov had three connected passed pawns to Deep Blue's single passed pawn.

Kasparov vs. Deep Blue, Catalan Opening (ECO E04)
1.Nf3 d5 2.d4 e6 3.g3 c5 4.Bg2 Nc6 5.0-0 Nf6 6.c4 dxc4 7.Ne5 Bd7 8.Na3 cxd4 9.Naxc4 Bc5 10.Qb3 0-0 11.Qxb7 Nxe5 12.Nxe5 Rb8 13.Qf3 Bd6 14.Nc6 Bxc6 15.Qxc6 e5 16.Rb1 Rb6 17.Qa4 Qb8 18.Bg5 Be7 19.b4 Bxb4 20.Bxf6 gxf6 21.Qd7 Qc8 22.Qxa7 Rb8 23.Qa4 Bc3 24.Rxb8 Qxb8 25.Be4 Qc7 26.Qa6 Kg7 27.Qd3 Rb8 28.Bxh7 Rb2 29.Be4 Rxa2 30.h4 Qc8 31.Qf3 Ra1 32.Rxa1 Bxa1 33.Qh5 Qh8 34.Qg4+ Kf8 35.Qc8+ Kg7 36.Qg4+ Kf8 37.Bd5 Ke7 38.Bc6 Kf8 39.Bd5 Ke7 40.Qf3 Bc3 41.Bc4 Qc8 42.Qd5 Qe6 43.Qb5 Qd7 44.Qc5+ Qd6 45.Qa7+ Qd7 46.Qa8 Qc7 47.Qa3+ Qd6 48.Qa2 f5 49.Bxf7 e4 50.Bh5 Qf6 51.Qa3+ Kd7 52.Qa7+ Kd8 53.Qb8+ Kd7 54.Be8+ Ke7 55.Bb5 Bd2 56.Qc7+ Kf8 57.Bc4 Bc3 58.Kg2 Be1 59.Kf1 Bc3 60.f4 exf3 61.exf3 Bd2 62.f4 Ke8 63.Qc8+ Ke7 64.Qc5+ Kd8 65.Bd3 Be3 66.Qxf5 Qc6 67.Qf8+ Kc7 68.Qe7+ Kc8 69.Bf5+ Kb8 70.Qd8+ Kb7 71.Qd7+ Qxd7 72.Bxd7 Kc7 73.Bb5 1–0 (Resignation)

Deep Blue had a configuration error so it played the entire game without its opening book, but its "extended book" managed to reproduce opening theory up to move 13, by scoring moves based on its dataset of 700,000 previous grandmaster games.

=== Game 3 ===
February 13. As in the first game, Kasparov played the Sicilian Defence to which Deep Blue again responded with the Alapin Variation. The game lasted for 39 moves and was drawn.

Deep Blue vs. Kasparov, Sicilian Defence, Alapin Variation (ECO B22)
1.e4 c5 2.c3 d5 3.exd5 Qxd5 4.d4 Nf6 5.Nf3 Bg4 6.Be2 e6 7.0-0 Nc6 8.Be3 cxd4 9.cxd4 Bb4 10.a3 Ba5 11.Nc3 Qd6 12.Ne5 Bxe2 13.Qxe2 Bxc3 14.bxc3 Nxe5 15.Bf4 Nf3+ 16.Qxf3 Qd5 17.Qd3 Rc8 18.Rfc1 Qc4 19.Qxc4 Rxc4 20.Rcb1 b6 21.Bb8 Ra4 22.Rb4 Ra5 23.Rc4 0-0 24.Bd6 Ra8 25.Rc6 b5 26.Kf1 Ra4 27.Rb1 a6 28.Ke2 h5 29.Kd3 Rd8 30.Be7 Rd7 31.Bxf6 gxf6 32.Rb3 Kg7 33.Ke3 e5 34.g3 exd4+ 35.cxd4 Re7+ 36.Kf3 Rd7 37.Rd3 Raxd4 38.Rxd4 Rxd4 39.Rxa6 b4 ½–½ (Draw by Agreement)

=== Game 4 ===
February 14. The fourth game was the second to end in a draw, although at one point Deep Blue's team declined Kasparov's draw offer. The opening transposed to a line of the Queen's Gambit Declined.

Kasparov vs. Deep Blue, Queen's Gambit Declined (ECO D30)
1.Nf3 d5 2.d4 c6 3.c4 e6 4.Nbd2 Nf6 5.e3 Nbd7 6.Bd3 Bd6 7.e4 dxe4 8.Nxe4 Nxe4 9.Bxe4 0-0 10.0-0 h6 11.Bc2 e5 12.Re1 exd4 13.Qxd4 Bc5 14.Qc3 a5 15.a3 Nf6 16.Be3 Bxe3 17.Rxe3 Bg4 18.Ne5 Re8 19.Rae1 Be6 20.f4 Qc8 21.h3 b5 22.f5 Bxc4 23.Nxc4 bxc4 24.Rxe8+ Nxe8 25.Re4 Nf6 26.Rxc4 Nd5 27.Qe5 Qd7 28.Rg4 f6 29.Qd4 Kh7 30.Re4 Rd8 31.Kh1 Qc7 32.Qf2 Qb8 33.Ba4 c5 34.Bc6 c4 35.Rxc4 Nb4 36.Bf3 Nd3 37.Qh4 Qxb2 38.Qg3 Qxa3 39.Rc7 Qf8 40.Ra7 Ne5 41.Rxa5 Qf7 42.Rxe5 fxe5 43.Qxe5 Re8 44.Qf4 Qf6 45.Bh5 Rf8 46.Bg6+ Kh8 47.Qc7 Qd4 48.Kh2 Ra8 49.Bh5 Qf6 50.Bg6 Rg8 ½–½ (Draw by Agreement)

=== Game 5 ===
February 16. The fifth game was the turning point of the match. Its opening transposed to the Scotch Four Knights Game, an opening combining the characteristics of the Scotch Game and the Four Knights Game. Game 5 was considered an embarrassment for the Deep Blue team because they had declined Kasparov's draw offer after the 23rd move. This was the only game in the match that Black won.

Deep Blue vs. Kasparov, Scotch Four Knights Game (ECO C47)
1.e4 e5 2.Nf3 Nf6 3.Nc3 Nc6 4.d4 exd4 5.Nxd4 Bb4 6.Nxc6 bxc6 7.Bd3 d5 8.exd5 cxd5 9.0-0 0-0 10.Bg5 c6 11.Qf3 Be7 12.Rae1 Re8 13.Ne2 h6 14.Bf4 Bd6 15.Nd4 Bg4 16.Qg3 Bxf4 17.Qxf4 Qb6 18.c4 Bd7 19.cxd5 cxd5 20.Rxe8+ Rxe8 21.Qd2 Ne4 22.Bxe4 dxe4 23.b3 Rd8 (=) 24.Qc3 f5 25.Rd1 Be6 26.Qe3 Bf7 27.Qc3 f4 28.Rd2 Qf6 29.g3 Rd5 30.a3 Kh7 31.Kg2 Qe5 32.f3 e3 33.Rd3 e2 34.gxf4 e1=Q 35.fxe5 Qxc3 36.Rxc3 Rxd4 37.b4 Bc4 38.Kf2 g5 39.Re3 Be6 40.Rc3 Bc4 41.Re3 Rd2+ 42.Ke1 Rd3 43.Kf2 Kg6 44.Rxd3 Bxd3 45.Ke3 Bc2 46.Kd4 Kf5 47.Kd5 h5 0–1 (Resignation)

=== Game 6 ===
Kasparov–Deep Blue, 1996, rd 6

Position: a8 black rook, b8 black bishop, c8 black rook, b7 black queen, f7 black pawn, a6 black pawn, b6 white pawn, c6 black pawn, e6 black pawn, f6 white bishop, g6 black pawn, h6 black king, a5 white pawn, c5 white queen, d5 black pawn, e5 white pawn, h5 black pawn, b4 white rook, h4 white pawn, g3 white pawn, f2 white pawn, c1 white rook, g1 white king

Final position after 43.Rb4

February 17. The sixth game, like the fourth, transposed to the same line of the Queen's Gambit Declined. The final game was an illustration of just how badly chess engines of the time could play in some positions. Employing anti-computer tactics and keeping the focus of the game on long-term planning, Kasparov slowly improved his position throughout the mid-game while Deep Blue wasted time doing very little to improve its position. By the end of the game, Deep Blue's pieces were crammed into its queenside corner with no moves to make aside from shuffling its king, giving Kasparov more than enough time to finish the rout. Kasparov's next move would probably have been 44.Qe7 to exchange the queens. That would have allowed his passed pawn, which was near promotion, to advance, leading to the win of one of Black's rooks.

Kasparov vs. Deep Blue, Queen's Gambit Declined (ECO D30)
1.Nf3 d5 2.d4 c6 3.c4 e6 4.Nbd2 Nf6 5.e3 c5 6.b3 Nc6 7.Bb2 cxd4 8.exd4 Be7 9.Rc1 0-0 10.Bd3 Bd7 11.0-0 Nh5 12.Re1 Nf4 13.Bb1 Bd6 14.g3 Ng6 15.Ne5 Rc8 16.Nxd7 Qxd7 17.Nf3 Bb4 18.Re3 Rfd8 19.h4 Nge7 20.a3 Ba5 21.b4 Bc7 22.c5 Re8 23.Qd3 g6 24.Re2 Nf5 25.Bc3 h5 26.b5 Nce7 27.Bd2 Kg7 28.a4 Ra8 29.a5 a6 30.b6 Bb8 31.Bc2 Nc6 32.Ba4 Re7 33.Bc3 Ne5 34.dxe5 Qxa4 35.Nd4 Nxd4 36.Qxd4 Qd7 37.Bd2 Re8 38.Bg5 Rc8 39.Bf6+ Kh7 40.c6 bxc6 41.Qc5 Kh6 42.Rb2 Qb7 43.Rb4 1–0 (Resignation)

== 1997 rematch ==
=== Game 1 ===
May 3. The 1997 rematch began with a line of the Réti Opening which later developed into the King's Indian Attack. Kasparov won the game in 45 moves.

Kasparov vs. Deep Blue, Réti Opening, King's Indian Attack (ECO A07)
1.Nf3 d5 2.g3 Bg4 3.b3 Nd7 4.Bb2 e6 5.Bg2 Ngf6 6.0-0 c6 7.d3 Bd6 8.Nbd2 0-0 9.h3 Bh5 10.e3 h6 11.Qe1 Qa5 12.a3 Bc7 13.Nh4 g5 14.Nhf3 e5 15.e4 Rfe8 16.Nh2 Qb6 17.Qc1 a5 18.Re1 Bd6 19.Ndf1 dxe4 20.dxe4 Bc5 21.Ne3 Rad8 22.Nhf1 g4 23.hxg4 Nxg4 24.f3 Nxe3 25.Nxe3 Be7 26.Kh1 Bg5 27.Re2 a4 28.b4 f5 29.exf5 e4 30.f4 Bxe2 31.fxg5 Ne5 32.g6 Bf3 33.Bc3 Qb5 34.Qf1 Qxf1+ 35.Rxf1 h5 36.Kg1 Kf8 37.Bh3 b5 38.Kf2 Kg7 39.g4 Kh6 40.Rg1 hxg4 41.Bxg4 Bxg4 42.Nxg4+ Nxg4+ 43.Rxg4 Rd5 44.f6 Rd1 45.g7 1–0 (Resignation)

Deep Blue's 44th move in this game was allegedly the result of a bug in which Deep Blue, unable to determine a desirable move, resorted to a fail-safe.

=== Game 2 ===
Deep Blue–Kasparov, 1997, rd 2

Position: b8 black rook, f7 black king, g7 black pawn, a6 white rook, b6 black queen, c6 white queen, d6 black bishop, f6 black pawn, h6 black pawn, b5 black pawn, d5 white pawn, e5 black pawn, f5 white pawn, b4 white pawn, c4 black pawn, e4 white bishop, c3 white pawn, h3 white pawn, g2 white pawn, f1 white king

Final position after 45.Ra6

May 4. The second game began with the Ruy Lopez opening, Smyslov Variation. Kasparov eventually resigned, although post-game analysis indicates that he could have held a draw in the final position. After this game Kasparov accused IBM of cheating, by alleging that a grandmaster (presumably a top rival) had been behind a certain move. The claim was repeated in the documentary Game Over: Kasparov and the Machine.

Deep Blue's first nine moves were from the opening book. The next moves were computed based on the extended book. After move 19. ... Nh4, the game was outside the extended book.

Deep Blue vs. Kasparov, Ruy Lopez, Smyslov Variation (ECO C93)
1.e4 e5 2.Nf3 Nc6 3.Bb5 a6 4.Ba4 Nf6 5.0-0 Be7 6.Re1 b5 7.Bb3 d6 8.c3 0-0 9.h3 h6 10.d4 Re8 11.Nbd2 Bf8 12.Nf1 Bd7 13.Ng3 Na5 14.Bc2 c5 15.b3 Nc6 16.d5 Ne7 17.Be3 Ng6 18.Qd2 Nh7 19.a4 Nh4 20.Nxh4 Qxh4 21.Qe2 Qd8 22.b4 Qc7 23.Rec1 c4 24.Ra3 Rec8 25.Rca1 Qd8 26.f4 Nf6 27.fxe5 dxe5 28.Qf1 Ne8 29.Qf2 Nd6 30.Bb6 Qe8 31.R3a2 Be7 32.Bc5 Bf8 33.Nf5 Bxf5 34.exf5 f6 35.Bxd6 Bxd6 36.axb5 axb5 37.Be4 Rxa2 38.Qxa2 Qd7 39.Qa7 Rc7 40.Qb6 Rb7 41.Ra8+ Kf7 42.Qa6 Qc7 43.Qc6 Qb6+ 44.Kf1 Rb8 45.Ra6 1–0 (Resignation)

At the time it was reported that Kasparov missed the fact that after 45...Qe3 46.Qxd6 Re8, Black (Kasparov) can force a draw by perpetual check. His friends told him so the next morning. They suggested 47.h4 h5!, a position after which the black queen can perpetually check White. This is possible as Deep Blue moved 44.Kf1 instead of an alternative move of its king. Regarding the end of game 2 and 44.Kf1 in particular, chess journalist Mig Greengard in the Game Over film states, "It turns out, that the position in, here at the end is actually a draw, and that, one of Deep Blue's final moves was a terrible error, because Deep Blue has two choices here. It can move its king here or move its king over here. It picked the wrong place to step." Another person in that film, four-time US champion Yasser Seirawan, then concludes that "The computer had left its king a little un-defended. And Garry could have threatened a perpetual check, not a win but a perpetual check."

The moves that surprised Kasparov enough to allege cheating were 36.axb5! axb5 37.Be4! after which Black is lost. A more materialistic machine could have won two pawns with 36.Qb6 Rd8 37.axb5 Rab8 38.Qxa6, but after 38...e4! Black would have acquired strong counterplay. Deep Blue could have also won material with the move 37.Qb6. Kasparov and many others thought the move 37.Be4! ignored material gain by force and was too sophisticated for a computer, suggesting there had been some sort of human intervention during the game.

=== Game 3 ===
May 6. In the third game, Kasparov chose to employ the irregular 1.d3, the Mieses Opening. The game then transposed to a line of the English Opening. Kasparov believed that by playing an esoteric opening, the computer would get out of its opening book and play the opening worse than it would have done using the book. Despite this anti-computer tactic, the game was drawn.

Kasparov vs. Deep Blue, English Opening, Four Knights System (ECO A28)
1.d3 e5 2.Nf3 Nc6 3.c4 Nf6 4.a3 d6 5.Nc3 Be7 6.g3 0-0 7.Bg2 Be6 8.0-0 Qd7 9.Ng5 Bf5 10.e4 Bg4 11.f3 Bh5 12.Nh3 Nd4 13.Nf2 h6 14.Be3 c5 15.b4 b6 16.Rb1 Kh8 17.Rb2 a6 18.bxc5 bxc5 19.Bh3 Qc7 20.Bg4 Bg6 21.f4 exf4 22.gxf4 Qa5 23.Bd2 Qxa3 24.Ra2 Qb3 25.f5 Qxd1 26.Bxd1 Bh7 27.Nh3 Rfb8 28.Nf4 Bd8 29.Nfd5 Nc6 30.Bf4 Ne5 31.Ba4 Nxd5 32.Nxd5 a5 33.Bb5 Ra7 34.Kg2 g5 35.Bxe5+ dxe5 36.f6 Bg6 37.h4 gxh4 38.Kh3 Kg8 39.Kxh4 Kh7 40.Kg4 Bc7 41.Nxc7 Rxc7 42.Rxa5 Rd8 43.Rf3 Kh8 44.Kh4 Kg8 45.Ra3 Kh8 46.Ra6 Kh7 47.Ra3 Kh8 48.Ra6 ½–½ (Draw by Agreement)

=== Game 4 ===
May 7. The fourth game began with the initial moves defining the Caro–Kann Defence (1.e4 c6); however, the opening then transposed to the Pirc Defense. Kasparov got into time trouble late in the game. The sub-optimal moves he played in a hurry may have cost him victory. The game ended with a draw.

Deep Blue vs. Kasparov, Pirc Defense (ECO B07)
1.e4 c6 2.d4 d6 3.Nf3 Nf6 4.Nc3 Bg4 5.h3 Bh5 6.Bd3 e6 7.Qe2 d5 8.Bg5 Be7 9.e5 Nfd7 10.Bxe7 Qxe7 11.g4 Bg6 12.Bxg6 hxg6 13.h4 Na6 14.0-0-0 0-0-0 15.Rdg1 Nc7 16.Kb1 f6 17.exf6 Qxf6 18.Rg3 Rde8 19.Re1 Rhf8 20.Nd1 e5 21.dxe5 Qf4 22.a3 Ne6 23.Nc3 Ndc5 24.b4 Nd7 25.Qd3 Qf7 26.b5 Ndc5 27.Qe3 Qf4 28.bxc6 bxc6 29.Rd1 Kc7 30.Ka1 Qxe3 31.fxe3 Rf7 32.Rh3 Ref8 33.Nd4 Rf2 34.Rb1 Rg2 35.Nce2 Rxg4 36.Nxe6+ Nxe6 37.Nd4 Nxd4 38.exd4 Rxd4 39.Rg1 Rc4 40.Rxg6 Rxc2 41.Rxg7+ Kb6 42.Rb3+ Kc5 43.Rxa7 Rf1+ 44.Rb1 Rff2 45.Rb4 Rc1+ 46.Rb1 Rcc2 47.Rb4 Rc1+ 48.Rb1 Rxb1+ 49.Kxb1 Re2 50.Re7 Rh2 51.Rh7 Kc4 52.Rc7 c5 53.e6 Rxh4 54.e7 Re4 55.a4 Kb3 56.Kc1 ½–½ (Draw by Agreement)

=== Game 5 ===
Kasparov–Deep Blue, 1997, rd 5

Position: a7 black pawn, b7 black pawn, g7 white pawn, b4 black king, c4 black pawn, f4 white knight, b3 black knight, e3 white rook, g3 white pawn, d2 black rook, b1 white king

Final position after 49...Kb4

May 10. The fifth game of the rematch began identically with the first, with a line of the Réti Opening developing into the King's Indian Attack. As in the fourth game, Deep Blue played a brilliant endgame that secured a draw, when it was looking as if Kasparov would win. It was later discovered that Kasparov had a win beginning with 44.Rg7+.

Kasparov vs. Deep Blue, Réti Opening, King's Indian Attack (ECO A07)
1.Nf3 d5 2.g3 Bg4 3.Bg2 Nd7 4.h3 Bxf3 5.Bxf3 c6 6.d3 e6 7.e4 Ne5 8.Bg2 dxe4 9.Bxe4 Nf6 10.Bg2 Bb4+ 11.Nd2 h5 12.Qe2 Qc7 13.c3 Be7 14.d4 Ng6 15.h4 e5 16.Nf3 exd4 17.Nxd4 0-0-0 18.Bg5 Ng4 19.0-0-0 Rhe8 20.Qc2 Kb8 21.Kb1 Bxg5 22.hxg5 N6e5 23.Rhe1 c5 24.Nf3 Rxd1+ 25.Rxd1 Nc4 26.Qa4 Rd8 27.Re1 Nb6 28.Qc2 Qd6 29.c4 Qg6 30.Qxg6 fxg6 31.b3 Nxf2 32.Re6 Kc7 33.Rxg6 Rd7 34.Nh4 Nc8 35.Bd5 Nd6 36.Re6 Nb5 37.cxb5 Rxd5 38.Rg6 Rd7 39.Nf5 Ne4 40.Nxg7 Rd1+ 41.Kc2 Rd2+ 42.Kc1 Rxa2 43.Nxh5 Nd2 44.Nf4 Nxb3+ 45.Kb1 Rd2 46.Re6 c4 47.Re3 Kb6 48.g6 Kxb5 49.g7 Kb4 ½–½ (Draw by Agreement)

If White plays 50.g8=Q, then Black can force a draw by threefold repetition, starting with 50...Rd1+ and then 51...Rd2+.

=== Game 6 ===
Deep Blue–Kasparov, 1997, rd 6

Position: a8 black rook, c8 black king, h8 black rook, a7 black pawn, d7 black knight, e7 black bishop, g7 black pawn, c6 black bishop, h6 black pawn, b5 black pawn, d5 black knight, f5 black pawn, c4 white pawn, d4 white pawn, d3 white queen, f3 white knight, g3 white bishop, b2 white pawn, f2 white pawn, g2 white pawn, h2 white pawn, a1 white rook, g1 white king

Final position after 19.c4

May 11. The final, deciding game of the rematch was a miniature, by far the shortest of any played during either match. Before the sixth game, the overall score was even: 2½–2½. As in game 4, Kasparov played the Caro–Kann Defence. Deep Blue made a knight sacrifice which wrecked Kasparov's defense and forced him to resign in less than twenty moves. As Kasparov later recounts, he chose to play a dubious opening in an effort to put Deep Blue out of its comfort zone. Although the knight sacrifice is a well-known refutation, Kasparov reasoned that an engine wouldn't play the move without a concrete gain.

Deep Blue vs. Kasparov, Caro–Kann Defence, Steinitz Variation (ECO B17)
1.e4 c6 2.d4 d5 3.Nc3 dxe4 4.Nxe4 Nd7 5.Ng5 Ngf6 6.Bd3 e6 7.N1f3 h6 8.Nxe6 Qe7 9.0-0 fxe6 10.Bg6+ Kd8 11.Bf4 b5 12.a4 Bb7 13.Re1 Nd5 14.Bg3 Kc8 15.axb5 cxb5 16.Qd3 Bc6 17.Bf5 exf5 18.Rxe7 Bxe7 19.c4 1–0 (Resignation)

== Impact and symbolic significance ==
Both matches were widely covered by the media, and Deep Blue became a celebrity. After the match, it was reported that IBM had dismantled Deep Blue, but in fact it remained in operation for several years.

Prizes were awarded for both matches by the sponsor, IBM Research, with Deep Blue's share going back to IBM. For the first match, the winner was awarded $400,000 and the loser $100,000; for the second match, the winner was awarded $700,000 and the loser $400,000. Carnegie Mellon University awarded an additional $100,000 to the Deep Blue team, a prize created by computer science professor Edward Fredkin in 1980 for the first computer program to beat a reigning world chess champion.

Deep Blue's win was seen as symbolically significant, a sign that artificial intelligence was catching up to human intelligence, and could defeat one of humanity's great intellectual champions. Later analysis tended to play down Kasparov's loss as a result of uncharacteristically bad play on Kasparov's part, and play down the intellectual value of chess as a game that can be defeated by brute force.

In a podcast discussion in December 2016, Kasparov reflected on his views of the match. He mentioned that after thorough research and introspection while writing a book, his perspective shifted. He acknowledged his increased respect for the Deep Blue team and a decrease in his opinion of both his own and Deep Blue's performance. He also noted the evolution of chess engines, and that modern ones easily surpass Deep Blue.

After Deep Blue's victory, the ancient Chinese game of Go, a game of simple rules and far more possible moves than chess, became the canonical example of a game where humans outmatched machines. Go requires more intuition and is far less susceptible to brute force. In 1997, many players with less than a year of experience could beat the best Go programs. But the programs gradually improved, and in 2015, Google DeepMind's AlphaGo program defeated the European Go champion Fan Hui in a private match. It then surprisingly defeated top-ranked Lee Sedol in the match AlphaGo versus Lee Sedol in 2016.

== See also ==
- AlphaGo versus Lee Sedol
- Arimaa – Kasparov's loss to Deep Blue inspired the creation of a new game designed to be difficult for computers, yet playable with a chess set.
- List of chess games
- Rematch – 2024 television miniseries based on the 1997 rematch
