= Deep Blue (chess computer) =

Chess-playing computer made by IBM

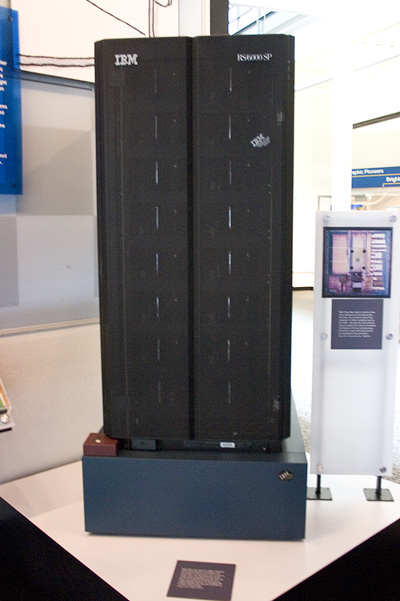
- A computer similar to Deep Blue at the Computer History Museum
- Active: 1995 (prototype); 1996 (release); 1997 (upgrade)
- Architecture: 1995: IBM RS/6000 with 14 custom VLSI first-generation "chess chips"; 1996: IBM RS/6000 SP with 30 PowerPC 604 "High 1" 120 MHz CPUs and 480 custom VLSI second-generation "chess chips"; 1997: IBM RS/6000 SP with 30 PowerPC 604e "High 2" 200 MHz CPUs and 480 custom VLSI second-generation "chess chips"
- Operating system: IBM AIX
- Space: 2 cabinets
- Speed: 11.38 GFLOPS (1997)
- Purpose: playing chess
- Website: ibm.com at the Wayback Machine (archived 2002-08-06)

Deep Blue was (Note: Parts of the computer were split up to museums) a customized IBM RS/6000 SP supercomputer for chess-playing designed by computer scientist Feng-hsiung Hsu. It was the first computer to win a game, and the first to win a match, against a reigning world champion under regular time controls. Development began in 1985 at Carnegie Mellon University under the name ChipTest. It then moved to IBM, where it was first renamed Deep Thought, then again in 1989 to Deep Blue. In 1996, it was used to compete against world champion Garry Kasparov in a six-game match, where it won one, drew two, and lost three games. In 1997, it underwent an upgrade, and in a six-game rematch it defeated Kasparov by winning two games and drawing three. Deep Blue's victory is considered a milestone in the history of artificial intelligence and has been the subject of several books and films.

== History ==
While a doctoral student at Carnegie Mellon University, Feng-hsiung Hsu began development of a chess-playing supercomputer under the name ChipTest. The machine won the North American Computer Chess Championship in 1987 and Hsu and his team followed up with a successor, Deep Thought, in 1988. After receiving his doctorate in 1989, Hsu and Murray Campbell joined IBM Research to continue their project to build a machine that could defeat a world chess champion. Their colleague Thomas Anantharaman briefly joined them at IBM before leaving for the finance industry and being replaced by programmer Arthur Joseph Hoane. Jerry Brody, a long-time employee of IBM Research, subsequently joined the team in 1990.

After Deep Thought's two-game 1989 loss to Kasparov, IBM held a contest to rename the chess machine: the winning name was "Deep Blue", submitted by Peter Fitzhugh Brown, which was a play on IBM's nickname, "Big Blue". (Note: IBM renamed "Deep Thought" because the name resembled the title of the hit pornographic film Deep Throat.) After a scaled-down version of Deep Blue played Grandmaster Joel Benjamin, Hsu and Campbell decided that Benjamin was the expert they were looking for to help develop Deep Blue's opening book, so they hired him to assist with the preparations for Deep Blue's matches against Garry Kasparov. In 1995, a Deep Blue prototype played in the eighth World Computer Chess Championship, playing Wchess to a draw before ultimately losing to Fritz in round five, despite playing as White.

Today, one of the two racks that made up Deep Blue is held by the National Museum of American History, having previously been displayed in an exhibit about the Information Age, while the other rack was acquired by the Computer History Museum in 1997, and is displayed in the Revolution exhibit's "Artificial Intelligence and Robotics" gallery. Several books were written about Deep Blue, among them Behind Deep Blue: Building the Computer that Defeated the World Chess Champion by Deep Blue developer Feng-hsiung Hsu.

== Deep Blue versus Kasparov ==
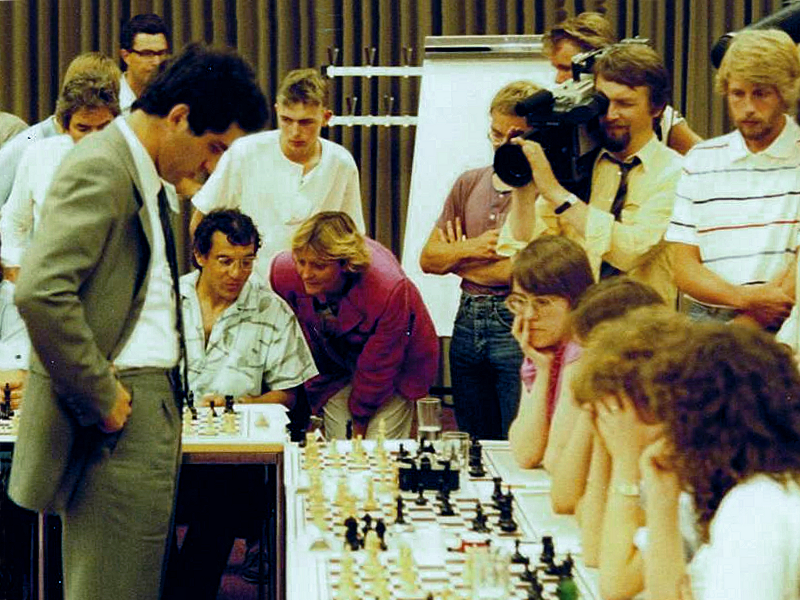
Garry Kasparov playing a simultaneous exhibition in 1985

Subsequent to its predecessor Deep Thought's 1989 loss to Garry Kasparov, Deep Blue played Kasparov twice more. In the first game of the first match, which took place from 10 to 17 February 1996, Deep Blue became the first machine to win a chess game against a reigning world champion under regular time controls. However, Kasparov won three and drew two of the following five games, beating Deep Blue by 4–2 at the close of the match.

Deep Blue's hardware was subsequently upgraded, (Note: Unofficially nicknamed "Deeper Blue".) doubling its speed before it faced Kasparov again in May 1997, when it won the six-game rematch 3½–2½. Deep Blue won the deciding game after Kasparov failed to secure his position in the opening, thereby becoming the first computer system to defeat a reigning world champion in a match under standard chess tournament time controls. The version of Deep Blue that defeated Kasparov in 1997 typically searched to a depth of six to eight moves, and twenty or more moves in some situations. David Levy and Monty Newborn estimate that each additional ply (half-move) of forward insight increases the playing strength between 50 and 70 Elo points.

In the 44th move of the first game of their second match, unknown to Kasparov, a bug in Deep Blue's code led it to enter an unintentional loop, which it exited by taking a randomly selected valid move. Kasparov did not take this possibility into account, and misattributed the seemingly pointless move to "superior intelligence". Subsequently, Kasparov experienced a decline in performance in the following game, though he denies this was due to anxiety in the wake of Deep Blue's inscrutable move.

After his loss, Kasparov said that he sometimes saw unusual creativity in the machine's moves, suggesting that during the second game, human chess players had intervened on behalf of the machine. IBM denied this, saying the only human intervention occurred between games. Kasparov demanded a rematch, but IBM had dismantled Deep Blue after its victory and refused the rematch. The rules allowed the developers to modify the program between games, an opportunity they said they used to shore up weaknesses in the computer's play that were revealed during the course of the match. Kasparov requested printouts of the machine's log files, but IBM refused, although the company later published the logs on the Internet.

The 1997 tournament awarded a $700,000 first prize to the Deep Blue team and a $400,000 second prize to Kasparov. Carnegie Mellon University awarded an additional $100,000 to the Deep Blue team, a prize created by computer science professor Edward Fredkin in 1980 for the first computer program to beat a reigning world chess champion.

== Aftermath ==
=== Chess ===
Kasparov initially called Deep Blue an "alien opponent", but later belittled it, stating that it was "as intelligent as your alarm clock". According to Martin Amis, two grandmasters who played Deep Blue agreed that it was "like a wall coming at you". Hsu had the rights to use the Deep Blue design independently of IBM, but also independently declined Kasparov's rematch offer. In 2003, the documentary film Game Over: Kasparov and the Machine investigated Kasparov's claims that IBM had cheated. In the film, some interviewees describe IBM's investment in Deep Blue as an effort to boost its stock value.

=== Other games ===
Following Deep Blue's victory, AI specialist Omar Syed designed a new game, Arimaa, which was intended to be very simple for humans but very difficult for computers to master; however, in 2015, computers proved capable of defeating strong Arimaa players. Since Deep Blue's victory, computer scientists have developed software for other complex board games with competitive communities. The AlphaGo series (AlphaGo, AlphaGo Zero, AlphaZero) defeated top Go players in 2016–2017.

=== Computer science ===
Computer scientists such as Deep Blue developer Campbell believed that playing chess was a good measurement for the effectiveness of artificial intelligence, and by beating a world champion chess player, IBM showed that they had made significant progress. Throughout the history of AI, game-playing had been used to demonstrate the capability of artificial intelligence programs and to discuss their limits. Some questioned the usefulness of game playing to other applications.

While Deep Blue, with its capability of evaluating 200 million positions per second, was the first computer to face a world chess champion in a formal match, it was a then-state-of-the-art expert system, relying upon rules and variables defined and fine-tuned by chess masters and computer scientists. In contrast, current chess engines such as Leela Chess Zero typically use reinforcement machine learning systems that train a neural network to play, developing its own internal logic rather than relying upon rules defined by human experts.

In a November 2006 match between Deep Fritz and world chess champion Vladimir Kramnik, the program ran on a computer system containing a dual-core Intel Xeon 5160 CPU, capable of evaluating only 8 million positions per second, but searching to an average depth of 17 to 18 plies (half-moves) in the middlegame thanks to heuristics; it won 4–2.

== Design ==
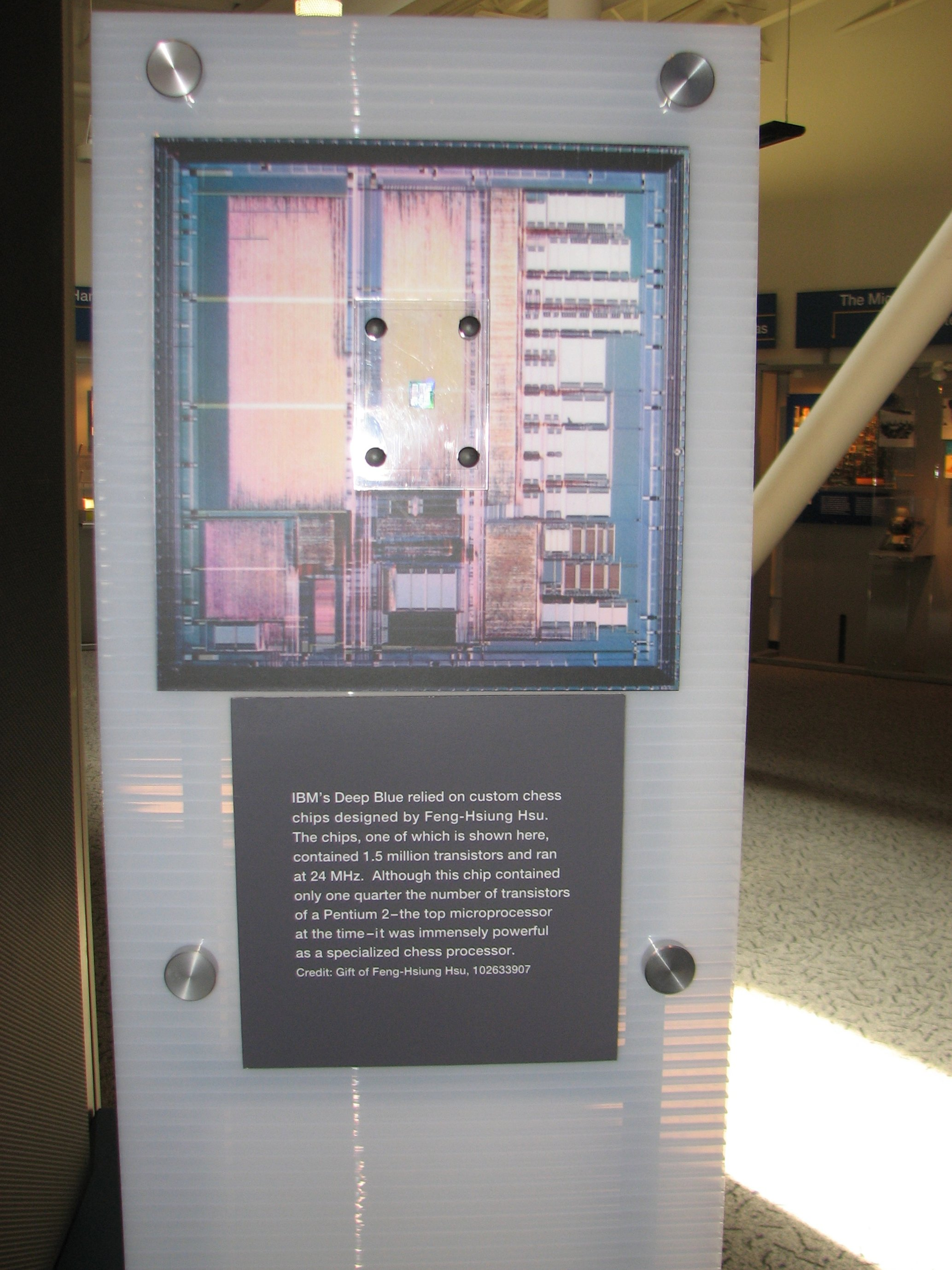
One of Deep Blue's processors

=== Software ===
Deep Blue ran under the AIX operating system, and its chess playing program was written in C. Its evaluation function was initially written in a generalized form, with many to-be-determined parameters (e.g., how important is a safe king position compared to a space advantage in the center, etc.). Values for these parameters were determined by analyzing thousands of master games. The evaluation function was then split into 8,000 parts, many of them designed for special positions. The opening book encapsulated more than 4,000 positions and 700,000 grandmaster games, while the endgame database contained many six-piece endgames and all five and fewer piece endgames. An additional database named the "extended book" summarizes entire games played by Grandmasters. The system combines its searching ability of 200 million chess positions per second with summary information in the extended book to select opening moves.

Before the second match, the program's rules were fine-tuned by grandmaster Joel Benjamin. The opening library was provided by grandmasters Miguel Illescas, John Fedorowicz, and Nick de Firmian. When Kasparov requested that he be allowed to study other games that Deep Blue had played so as to better understand his opponent, IBM refused, leading Kasparov to study many popular PC chess games to familiarize himself with computer gameplay.

=== Hardware ===
Deep Blue used custom VLSI chips to parallelize the alpha–beta search algorithm, an example of symbolic AI. The system derived its playing strength mainly from computing power. It was an IBM RS/6000 SP, a supercomputer with a massively parallel architecture based on 30 PowerPC 604e processors and 480 custom 600 nm CMOS VLSI "chess chips" designed to execute the chess-playing expert system, as well as FPGAs intended to allow patching of the VLSIs (which ultimately went unused) all housed in two cabinets. The chess chip has four parts: the move generator, the smart-move stack, the evaluation function, and the search control. The move generator is an 8×8 combinational logic circuit, a chess board in miniature.

In 1997, Deep Blue was upgraded again to become the 259th most powerful supercomputer according to the TOP500 list, achieving 11.38 GFLOPS on the parallel high performance LINPACK benchmark. Deeper Blue was capable of evaluating 200 million positions per second, twice as many as the 1996 version.

== See also ==
- Anti-computer tactics, which exploit the repetitive habits of computers
- IBM Watson, which could adeptly answer questions in human language
- Mechanical Turk, an 18th- and 19th-century hoax purported to be a chess-playing machine
- X3D Fritz, which also tied Kasparov
- Rematch, a 2024 TV miniseries about the 1997 match
