= Fast Universal Digital Computer M-2 =

The M-2 (Russian: М-2) was a Soviet stored-program electronic computer developed in 1952 at the Laboratory of Electrical Systems of the Institute of Energy of the USSR Academy of Sciences under the direction of I. S. Brook (also transliterated as Bruk). The development team, led on a day-to-day basis by M. A. Kartsev, comprised between seven and ten engineers including T. M. Aleksandridi, V. V. Belynsky, A. B. Zalkind, V. D. Knyazev, V. P. Kuznetsova, Yu. A. Lavrenyuk, L. S. Legezo, G. I. Tanetov and A. I. Schurov. The M-2 was the immediate successor to the M-1, the laboratory's earlier and smaller machine, and was one of three major Soviet computers (alongside the BESM and Strela) used in defence, scientific and economic computing in the mid-1950s.

== Background ==
The M-2 was developed in the Laboratory of Electrical Systems in the Institute of Energy of the USSR Academy of Sciences (renamed the Laboratory of Controlling Machines and Systems in 1957 and the Institute of Electronic Controlling Machines in 1958). Isaak Brook, the laboratory's director, had previously led the development of the M-1, the Soviet Union's first small electronic computer, which had been put into operation in spring 1952. Architecturally, the M-2 was partly based on the same principles as the M-1, but it was substantially larger, faster, and intended for full-scale production-quality scientific computation rather than experimental use.

== Design and architecture ==
The M-2 was a parallel, stored-program binary computer with a three-address instruction format. Each 34-bit instruction comprised a 4-bit opcode followed by three 10-bit operand addresses (two source operands and a result address), the address width being chosen to accommodate the machine's 1,024-word main memory. The instruction set contained 30 distinct instructions, including six arithmetic operations, algebraic and absolute-value comparison, seven format-switching operations (between fixed and floating point and between single and double precision), a logical multiplication (bitwise AND), shifts, carry and sign-change operations, four input and three output instructions, four magnetic-tape rewind operations, and a halt. A compact mixed-radix notation, combining base-4 and base-16 digits, was used to display addresses in printed listings.

Arithmetic was carried out in a parallel arithmetic unit with four trigger registers, supporting both fixed-point and floating-point representations with precision of up to ten decimal digits in fixed point and up to eight decimal digits in floating point. Double-precision arithmetic was also supported. Average sustained performance was about 2,000 instructions per second.

The main internal memory was a Williams tube-style electrostatic store of up to 512 numbers, built from standard 13L037 cathode-ray tubes rather than the specialised potentioscopes used in the BESM and Strela; the team avoided the procurement and engineering problems that the BESM developers had encountered with potentioscopes by adapting the cheaper, widely available cathode-ray tubes for the purpose. The store had a regeneration cycle of 25 microseconds. A magnetic drum of up to 512 numbers, rotating at 2,860 rpm, was used as additional internal storage, and a magnetic-tape drive of up to 50,000 numbers served as external storage. Input was via punched tape reader and output to a teletypewriter.

The control and arithmetic logic used vacuum tubes in combination with semiconductor diodes. The use of diode logic for combinational circuits, originally introduced on the M-1 and continued in the M-2 and the later M-3, was a precursor to the diode-transistor logic (DTL) circuit families used in second- and third-generation Soviet computers. The M-2 used 1,879 electronic tubes in total, including 203 in its power supplies, and was powered from a three-phase 127/220 V alternating-current supply with a consumption of 29 kW.

== Construction ==
The M-2 was designed, built and assembled between April and December 1952, with the small Moscow-based development team working in parallel on architecture, circuit design and engineering. The machine's main units were laid out in four cabinets on a single foundation alongside a power supply box, with a separate operator console carrying control switches and indicator lamps for the trigger states of the arithmetic, selector and starting registers. The complete system occupied around 22 square metres of floor space and used closed-cycle air cooling. Each computer unit was constructed from removable valve sub-blocks fitted with 14- or 20-pin connectors, an arrangement intended to simplify diagnosis and replacement of faulty components using dedicated monitoring rigs.

The magnetic drum for the secondary store was developed by A. I. Schurov in the laboratory in parallel with the development of the computer itself. During the winter of 1955 and again in 1956 the machine was substantially upgraded, with ferrite-core main memory replacing the electrostatic store and bringing the main-memory capacity to 4,096 numbers. The core-memory development was led by Kartsev and included O. V. Rosnitcky, L. V. Ivanov, E. N. Filinov and V. I. Zolotarevsky.

== Software and applications ==
The M-2 was put into routine service in 1953 and was used thereafter for solving applied scientific and engineering problems on a round-the-clock basis, mostly in nuclear fission reactor calculations and rocket design. A library of standard programs and subroutines for the machine was assembled from 1953 onward by A. L. Brudno and M. M. Vladimirova, with assistance from A. S. Kronrod and G. M. Adelson-Velsky.

An informal community of programmers grew up around the M-2 in the mid-1950s, with members drawn from a number of different Moscow institutes; it included Adelson-Velsky, V. L. Arlazarov, M. M. Bongard, Brudno, M. Ya. Vainshtein, D. M. Grobman, Kronrod, E. M. Landis, I. Ya. Landau and A. L. Lunts. Beyond practical programming methodology, this group worked on game-playing, pattern recognition and diagnostic problems on the M-2, and the work fed directly into the development of new methods of exhaustive search (notably the branch and bound algorithm) and into early Soviet work on search structures using logarithmic notation. A program developed by Kronrod and Arlazarov for the M-2 won the First International Match of Chess Programs, the 1966-1967 chess match between Soviet and Stanford computers, although the M-2's role in the match itself was as the program's original development platform rather than as the playing machine. Brudno's work on programming the M-2 in "informative denotations" was an early form of high-level notation for instruction sequences.

== Users ==
M-2 time was made available to a range of Soviet research institutes and academies. Documented users included the Institute of Atomic Energy under S. L. Sobolev, the Institute for Theoretical and Experimental Physics (ITEP) under A. I. Alikhanov, the Institute of Problems of Mechanics of the USSR Academy of Sciences (which used the M-2 for structural calculations on the Kuibyshev and Volga hydroelectric dams), the Heat Engineering Laboratory under M. A. Mikheev, the Air Force Academy, the Artillery Academy, the Stalproyekt Institute, and the bureau directed by A. I. Berg. In February 1957 the machine was demonstrated at the All-Union Exhibition of Achievements of the National Economy (VDNKh, now VVC) in Moscow, configured with a remote terminal in the Hall of the Academy of Sciences.

== Influence and legacy ==
The Russian Virtual Computer Museum article identifies several engineering and architectural contributions of the M-2 that fed into later Soviet machines. The diode-based combinational logic refined for the M-1, M-2 and M-3 was a direct precursor of the diode-transistor logic families used in second- and third-generation Soviet computers; the short-instruction, three-address format combined with format-switching operations introduced by Kartsev influenced the design of effective-address calculation in later Soviet machine architectures; and the use of standard cathode-ray tubes rather than specialised potentioscopes for electrostatic memory was widely adopted in subsequent designs in preference to the more difficult potentioscope route taken by the BESM team.

The M-2 itself was reported to have a similar peak performance to the contemporaneous Strela computer while occupying roughly one-sixth of the floor space, consuming approximately one-eighth of the power, and costing about one-tenth as much.

== See also ==
- M-1
- M-3
- BESM
- Strela computer
- History of computer hardware in Soviet Bloc countries
