= November 1966 =

Month of 1966

<<	November 1966					>>
Su	Mo	Tu	We	Th	Fr	Sa
		1	2	3	4	5
6	7	8	9	10	11	12
13	14	15	16	17	18	19
20	21	22	23	24	25	26
27	28	29	30

November 30, 1966: Barbados becomes independent

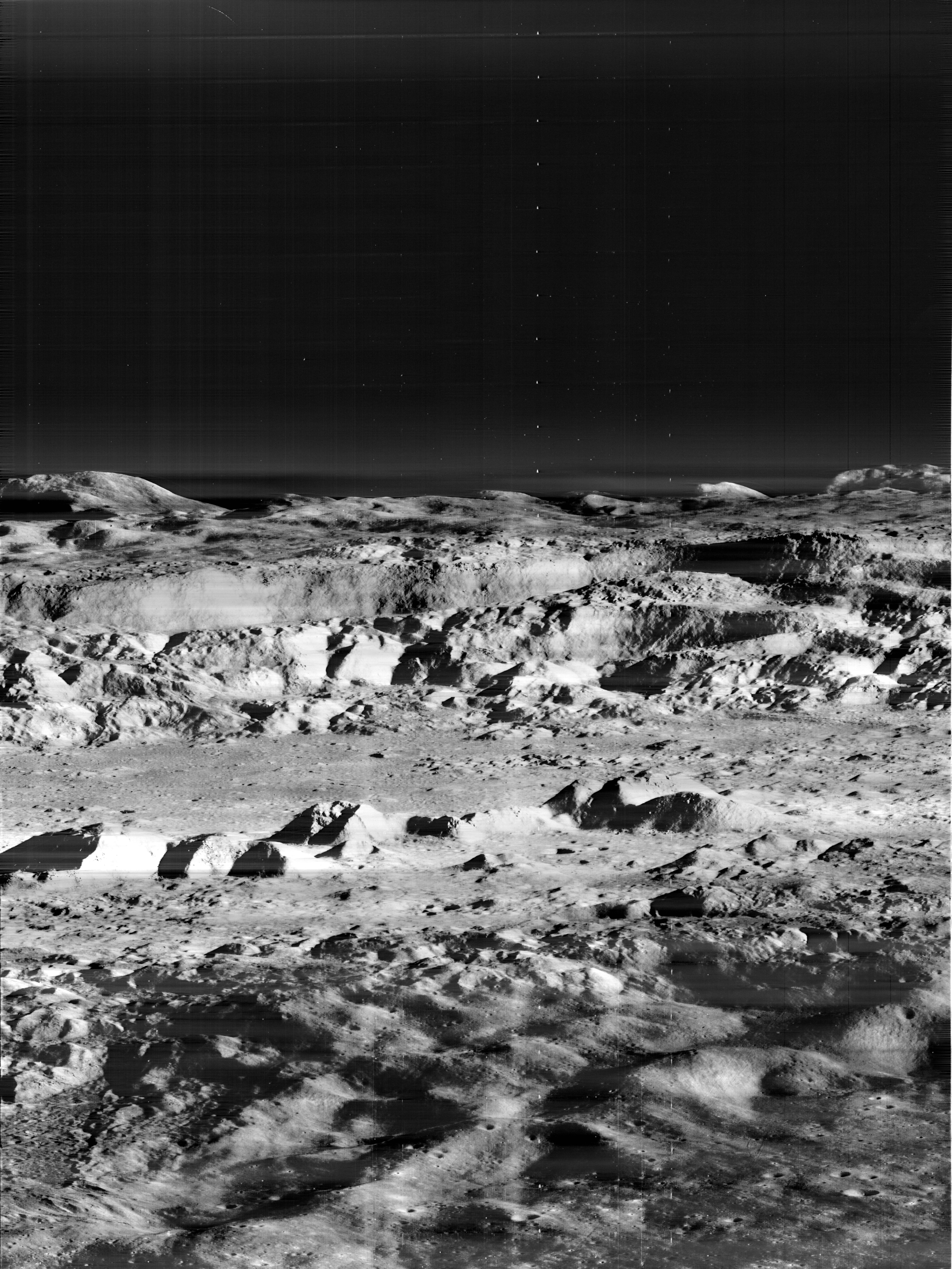
November 30, 1966: NASA releases first "bird's eye view" of the lunar surface

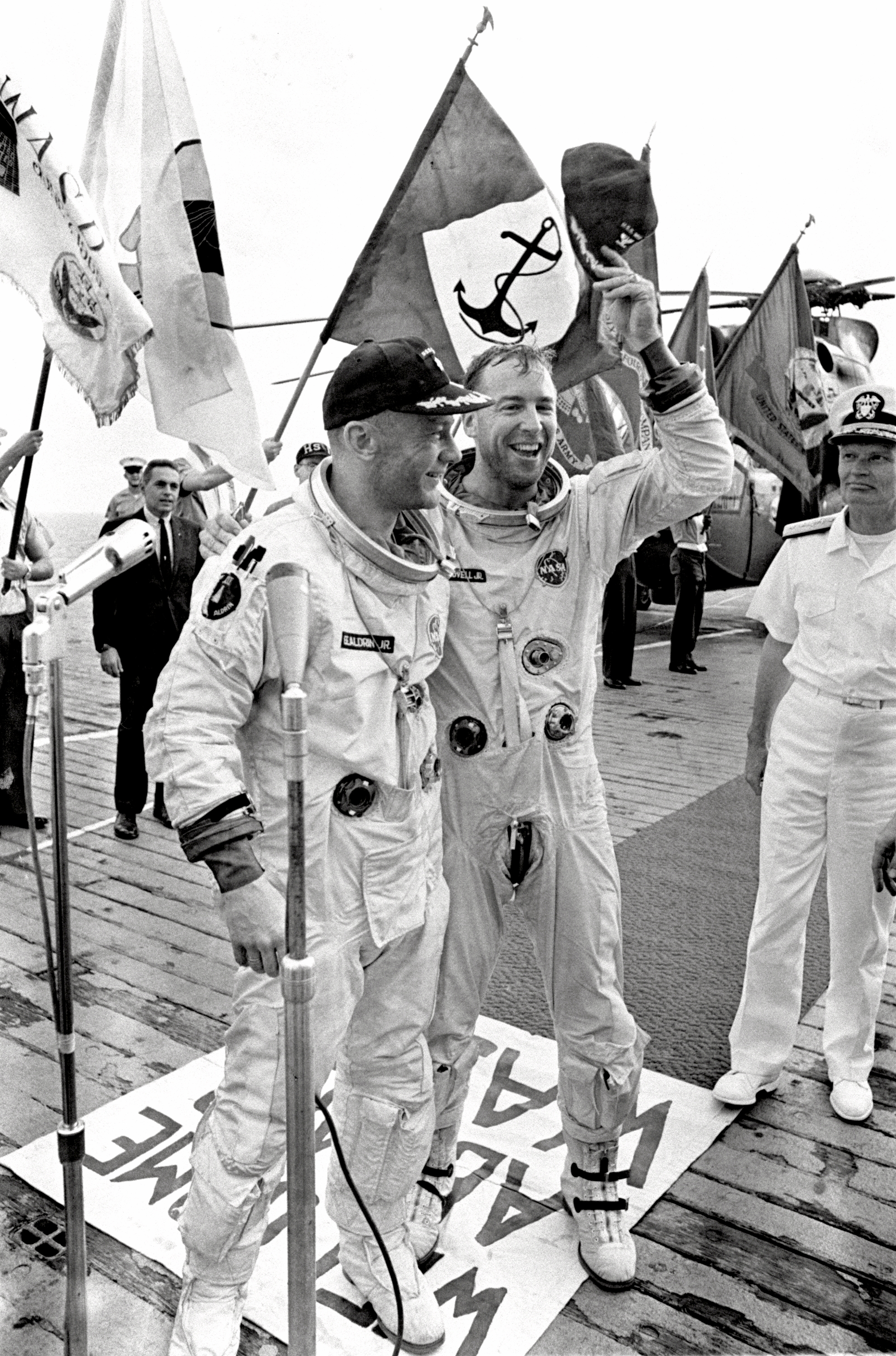
November 15, 1966: Lovell and Aldrin complete the last Gemini mission

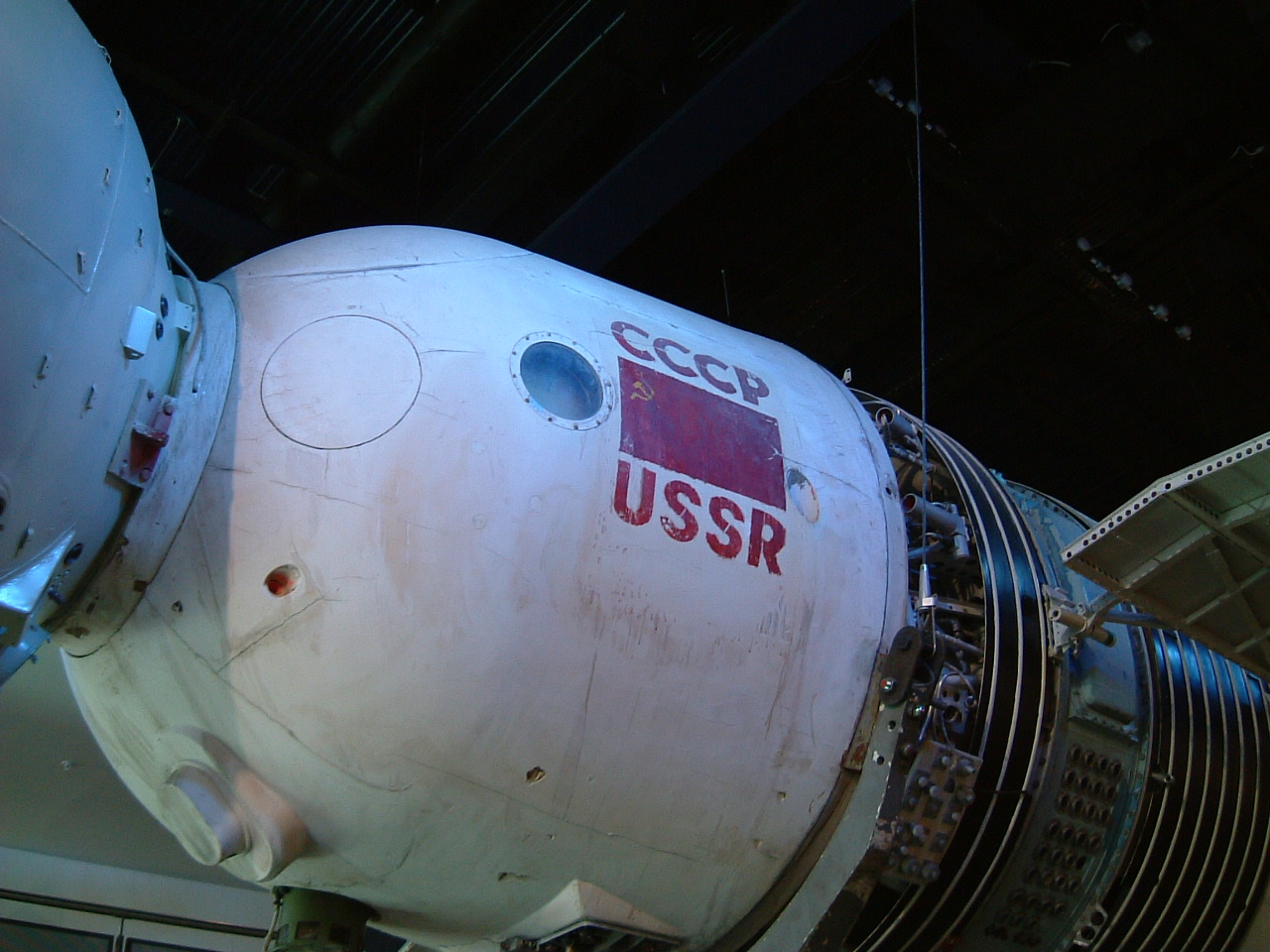
November 28, 1966: Soyuz program begins

The following events occurred in November 1966:

== November 1, 1966 (Tuesday) ==
- Hospital administrators at the Riverdell Hospital in Oradell, New Jersey, opened an investigation of one of the staff physicians, Dr. Mario Jascalevich, after a hospital surgeon discovered 18 open bottles, most of them almost empty, of the poison curare in Dr. Jascalevich's locker. Suspicion had arisen after nine of Dr. Jascalevich's patients had died after minor surgeries in the previous eleven months, the most recent victim being a 36-year-old mother who had died on October 23 after a Cesarean section. The doctor's explanation for the curare was that he had been "engaged in personal experiments on dogs", and he would continue to practice until 1976, when his indictment for five murders in what would become known as the "Dr. X killings" because of efforts to protect his anonymity during the trial. Jascalevich would be acquitted in 1978, and the case remains unsolved.
- Inventor Candido Jacuzzi of Lafayette, California, was granted U.S. Design Patent No. 206,143 for a large "Hydrotherapy Tub" that would bear his family's surname. Jacuzzi, who had immigrated to the United States from Italy at the age of 17, had developed the initial technology, a pump that could create a swirling whirlpool within a standard bathtub, in 1947. The invention had arisen from necessity, to ease the rheumatoid arthritis of Candido's child, who would document the history in a 2005 book.
- Twelve firefighters in California were trapped and burned to death while fighting a blaze inside a canyon in the Pacoima area of the San Fernando Valley. All were members of the "El Coriso hot shots", a service crew for the U.S. Forestry Service in the nearby Cleveland National Forest. Ten died in the fire and two died a few days later in hospital from injuries sustained in the blaze. This event is known as the Loop Fire.
- On All Saints' Day, the National Football League awarded an expansion franchise to the largest city of Louisiana, and the owners announced that the pro football team would be called the New Orleans Saints.
- Haryana became the 17th state of India, after being separated from the existing Punjab State by the Indian government. B. D. Sharma was installed as the first Chief Minister of Haryana at the capital, Chandigarh.

== November 2, 1966 (Wednesday) ==
- Israel moved one step closer to developing its own nuclear weapons when its armaments agency, RAFAEL (an acronym based upon Reshut l'pituah Emtzaei L'ehima, Hebrew for "Authority for the Development of Means of Warfare") achieved a successful test implosion of a nuclear device. RAFAEL Director Munya Mador would later describe the date as the moment that "a test of special import" was achieved, representing "unambiguous experimental proof of the efficacy of the system" that "we had waited many years for."
- A low-level conflict within the Korean Demilitarized Zone began as six American soldiers and one South Korean were killed by members of the North Korean Army, who had penetrated 0.5 miles (0.80 km) inside South Korea. The attack, which followed a call on October 5 by North Korea's Kim Il Sung for "a positive struggle against U.S. imperialism", coincided with a visit by U.S. President Lyndon B. Johnson to South Korea.
- NASA's George E. Mueller announced plans to proceed with the Apollo Applications Program (AAP) project for an Orbital Workshop space station, starting by launching the complete airlock, Workshop, and multiple docking adapter into orbit at least a year before sending an astronaut crew. The first two missions would send three astronauts to the orbiting station for a 28-day flight and establish a larger clustered space configuration for subsequent missions in the era after the Apollo program exploration of the Moon.
- The Cuban Adjustment Act came into force, allowing automatic permanent residency (a prerequisite to United States citizenship) for any citizen of Cuba who had legally immigrated to the United States after January 1, 1959. The Act affected 123,000 refugees and their families who had fled the regime of Fidel Castro.
- Legislative elections were held in Barbados, in preparation for independence, with a 79.7% voter turnout. The Democratic Labour Party, led by Errol Barrow, won a majority in the new parliament, capturing 14 of the 24 seats.
- Air Canada began the first North American air services to the Soviet Union, starting with the flight of a DC-8 jet from Montreal to Moscow. The first Aeroflot flight from the Soviet Union to Canada would be inaugurated two days later.
- Leaders of West Germany's ruling coalition, the Christian Democratic Union and the Christian Social Union, called upon their leader, Ludwig Erhard, to resign as Chancellor of West Germany.
- Born: David Schwimmer, American actor best known for portraying Ross Geller on Friends; in New York City
- Died:
  - Sadao Araki, 89, war criminal, general in the Imperial Japanese Army, and Minister of War during World War II, who served ten years in prison after being convicted of war crimes.
  - Peter Debye, 82, Dutch chemist who won the 1936 Nobel Prize in Chemistry
  - Mississippi John Hurt, 73, African-American singer and guitarist

== November 3, 1966 (Thursday) ==
- Che Guevara, who had helped Fidel Castro take power in Cuba before setting off on fomenting similar popular uprisings in other nations, arrived in La Paz, Bolivia, with plans to help lead a guerrilla war against the Bolivian government. Clean-shaven, bald and wearing glasses, Guevara, entered the country with a passport from Uruguay as "Adolfo Mena Gonzalez", and was identified as a "Special Envoy of the Organization of American States". Within two months after his arrival, however, he found that the Bolivian Communist Party had no wish to start a violent revolution, and set off to conduct his own fight, eventually being captured and executed in 1967.
- The Nobel Committee announced in Stockholm that Professor Robert Mulliken of the United States would receive the Nobel Prize in Chemistry for "his fundamental work concerning chemical bonds and the electronic structure of molecules by the molecular orbital method", and Professor Alfred Kastler of France would get the Nobel Prize in Physics for "the discovery and development of optical methods for studying Hertzian resonances in atoms".
- Died: Fritz Baumgarten, 83, German illustrator of children's books

== November 4, 1966 (Friday) ==
- A flash flood killed 149 people when the Arno River swept through the city of Florence in Italy. Shortly after 9:00 p.m., the Arno's waters swept through the city. Exacerbated by the ancient city's narrow streets, the water level rose 18 ft (5.5 m) within two hours. With "a combination of moderately high tide, the runoff of torrential rain from the day before, and a sirocco wind blowing northward up the Adriatic", the river brought the highest recorded water level in Florence, peaking at 22 ft (6.7 m). Besides the death toll (with 35 of the deaths in Florence itself, and another 114 in the surrounding countryside), the flood of the Arno destroyed millions of dollars' worth of Renaissance art masterpieces and rare books, and causing more damage than had been suffered during World War II. The basements and first floor of the renowned Uffizi Gallery were inundated with water and mud, and water filled the Convent of St. Mark and the Florence Cathedral. Damaged also were the holdings of the Santa Croce Basilica, and six million books in the Italian national library and state archives (Biblioteca Nazionale Centrale). The previous recorded high had been exactly 633 years earlier, on November 4, 1333. In Venice, which suffered its worst flooding in several centuries, the rise of the waters to more than six feet above normal "cut the country virtually in half", destroyed gondolas and boats, and damaged many of the foot bridges over the canals.
- In Cairo, Prime Minister Yusuf Zuayyin of Syria signed a mutual defense pact with Egypt, committing each nation to coming to the other's aid in the event of a war with Israel. The treaty had been proposed by Egypt's President Gamel Abdel Nasser, who believed that Syrian provocation of Israel would end up bringing the entire Middle East into a war, as an attempt to bring Syria's incursions under control by requiring that the two nations consult with each other before undertaking military action.

== November 5, 1966 (Saturday) ==
- Ghana released the Foreign Minister of Guinea, General Joseph Ankrah, and 18 other Guineans who had been held as prisoners in Accra since being removed from an airliner while on their way to the meeting of the Organization of African Unity (OAU) in Addis Ababa, Ethiopia. The arrest and detention of the Guinean delegates had taken place on October 29 after Ghana alleged that many of its nationals were being held as prisoners by Guinea. The government of Ethiopia and the OAU negotiated the release of the Ghana delegation, which then proceeded to the summit in Ethiopia.
- KADS 103.5 FM, the first radio station devoted to have programming that consisted entirely of ads, went on the air in Los Angeles, after radio broadcaster Gordon McLendon came up with the idea for a service where listeners would pay for classified advertising ("want ads") to be read over the radio. In March 1968, McLendon would drop the "K-Ads" in favor of an all-music format, and be allowed to change the station name to KOST-FM.
- George E. Mueller, NASA Associate Administrator for Manned Space Flight, recommended to Robert C. Seamans, Jr., the lunar module ascent stage/half-rack Apollo telescope mount (LM/ATM) as the baseline configuration for development of the ATM.
- Born: Chester Turner, American serial killer and sex offender who was sentenced to death for sexually assaulting and murdering fourteen women in Los Angeles between 1987 and 1998; in Warren, Arkansas
- Died: Dietrich von Choltitz, 71, Nazi German military governor of Paris in World War II. After being installed as Military Governor on August 2, 1944, General von Choltitz defied a direct order, from Adolf Hitler, to destroy Paris rather than to let it fall to the Allied invasion force. Instead, he surrendered the city "relatively intact" when troops arrived, and was ostracized after his post-war return home. A fellow general once said, "He has more friends in France than he has in Germany." His self-published 1950 autobiography, Is Paris Burning?, inspired a bestselling book by the same name.

== November 6, 1966 (Sunday) ==
- Lunar Orbiter 2 was launched by the United States from Cape Kennedy at 6:21 p.m. local time. After initially orbiting at 122 miles (196 kilometers) above the surface, the probe was guided to a lower orbit of only 30 miles (48 km) over the Moon by November 15, and during the week of November 18 to November 25, took 609 high resolution photographs of landing sites.
- At the OAU summit in Addis Ababa, 38 African nations unanimously passed a resolution demanding that the United Kingdom use force to retake control of its former colony of Rhodesia, which had declared its independence with a white minority government in 1965.
- Died: Hugh Fraser, 63, Scottish baron and entrepreneur who created the House of Fraser department store chain in the United Kingdom.

== November 7, 1966 (Monday) ==
- Legislative elections were held in Trinidad and Tobago. The People's National Movement, led by Prime Minister Eric Williams, retained its two-thirds majority, with 24 of the 36 seats in the House of Representatives, while the Democratic Labour Party, with heavy support from the citizens of East Indian descent, and led by Rudranath Capildeo, won the other 12 seats.
- In a massive demonstration in New Delhi, India, Hindu protesters demanded a ban on the slaughter of cows in India, as enacted in the Directive Principles of State Policy in the Constitution of India. A crowd of 10,000 protesters tried to storm parliament, then rampaged through the city. A 48-hour curfew was ordered, and future meetings were banned.
- The Roman Catholic Diocese of Jundiaí was established in Brazil.

== November 8, 1966 (Tuesday) ==
- Midterm elections were held for the U.S. House of Representatives and for one-third of the U.S. Senate seats, as well as for offices in various American states. In the House, the Republicans gained 47 seats from the Democrats and three seats in the Senate but the Democratic Party retained a 248–187 majority in the House and a 64 to 33 in the Senate. Among individual winners, former Massachusetts Attorney General Edward Brooke, a Republican, became the first African American elected to the United States Senate since Blanche K. Bruce during the Reconstruction Era a century earlier. Film and television actor Ronald Reagan was elected Governor of California, oil company chairman George H. W. Bush won his first election ever, as a U.S. Representative for Texas, and Baltimore County Executive Spiro Agnew as Governor of Maryland. Charles H. Percy, whose daughter had been brutally murdered in September, was elected U.S. Senator for Illinois. Lucius Amerson was made the first African-American county sheriff in Alabama in more than a century. In a referendum in Nebraska, voters narrowly approved a constitutional amendment that abolished state property taxes, and voted against a measure for the necessary approval of a state income tax. Louisiana voters approved a project for the construction of the Louisiana Superdome (which would open in 1975).
- Guinea's President Sekou Toure ordered all Peace Corps volunteers to leave the African nation within one week.
- Levi Eshkol, the Prime Minister of Israel (as well as its Minister of Defense), announced the end of military government over the Arab-minority regions of the nation in Galilee (Al-Jalil), the Negev (Naqab), and the "Little Triangle" (HaMeshulash or al-Muthallath). The Knesset gave its approval by a 48–7 vote, and military administration formally terminated on December 1.
- NASA official John H. Disher announced a sequence for future missions of the Saturn/Apollo Applications program. SAA-209 would send a crew on a block II CSM 28-day flight. SAA-210 would launch the docking adapter for the airlock and the Orbital Workshop. SAA-211 would send a crew on a 56-day flight, and SAA-212 would launch the Apollo lunar module telescope mount.
- One day before the Wednesday scheduled launch of Gemini 12, the flight was postponed by malfunctions to be sent up on Thursday, then Friday, and finally to Saturday, November 11.
- Born: Gordon Ramsay, British chef, restaurateur and television host, known for the Hell's Kitchen and Kitchen Nightmares shows in the U.S. and UK; in Johnstone, Renfrewshire
- Died: Bernhard Zondek, 75, German-born Israeli gynecologist, developer of the first reliable pregnancy test

== November 9, 1966 (Wednesday) ==
- In one of the variations of the "Paul is dead" rumors that would begin in 1967 following the retirement of The Beatles from live performances, the story would later be spread that Paul McCartney had been killed in an auto accident on November 9, 1966. The rumor, which aided the sale of Beatles records, would ultimately be debunked by the Beatles' press agent on October 21, 1969, followed by an interview by BBC reporter Chris Drake and photographs published in LIFE magazine's November 7, 1969 issue.
- John Lennon of the Beatles met Yoko Ono at the Indica Gallery on either November 7 or 9. They would marry and live together for 11 years before John Lennon's murder in 1980.
- Died: Peter Hillwood (born Adolf Bergolz), 46, British Royal Air Force and test pilot, was killed in a plane crash.

== November 10, 1966 (Thursday) ==
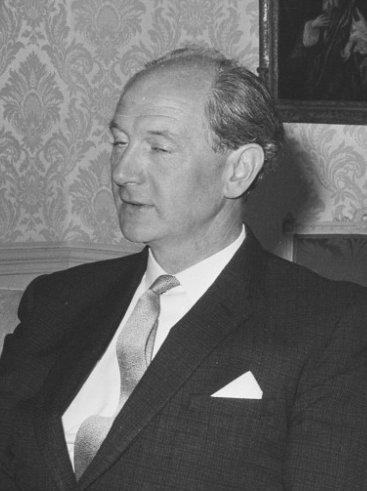
Jack Lynch of Ireland

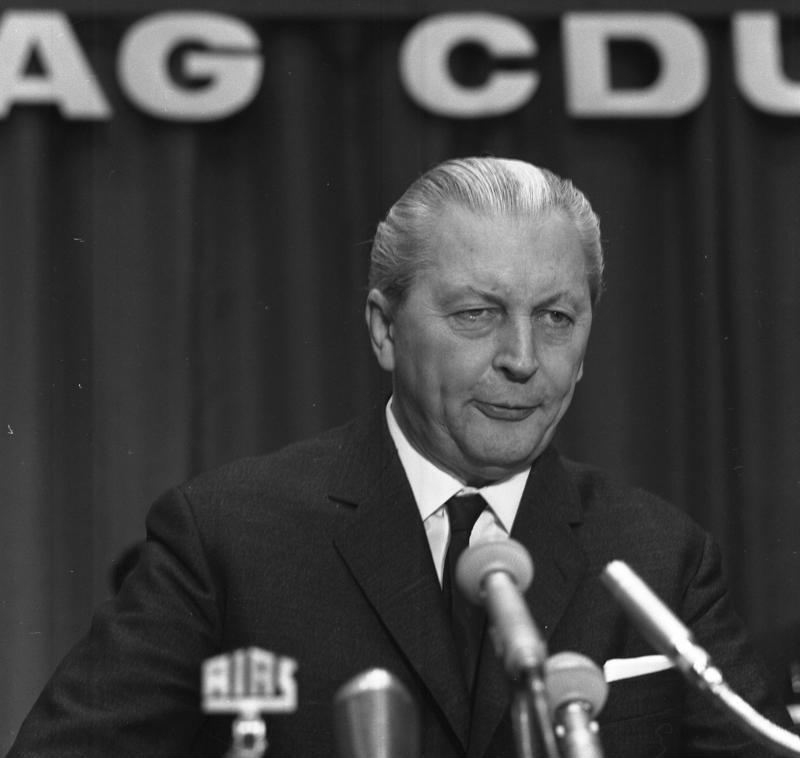
Kurt Georg Kiesinger of West Germany

- Seán Lemass retired as Taoiseach (Prime Minister) of the Republic of Ireland for health reasons. The Dáil Éireann, Ireland's parliament, elected Finance Minister Jack Lynch, the successor to Lemass as leader of the Fianna Fáil party, 71–64. The other votes went to Liam Cosgrave, leader of the Fine Gael party, as the members of parliament voted along party lines.
- On the third round of balloting, Kurt Georg Kiesinger was selected as the successor to Chancellor Ludwig Erhard as leader of West Germany's CDU/CSU party, ahead of rival candidate Rainer Barzel. Leadership of West Germany's majority party meant that Kiesinger would become the next Chancellor of West Germany when Erhard resigned on November 30.

== November 11, 1966 (Friday) ==
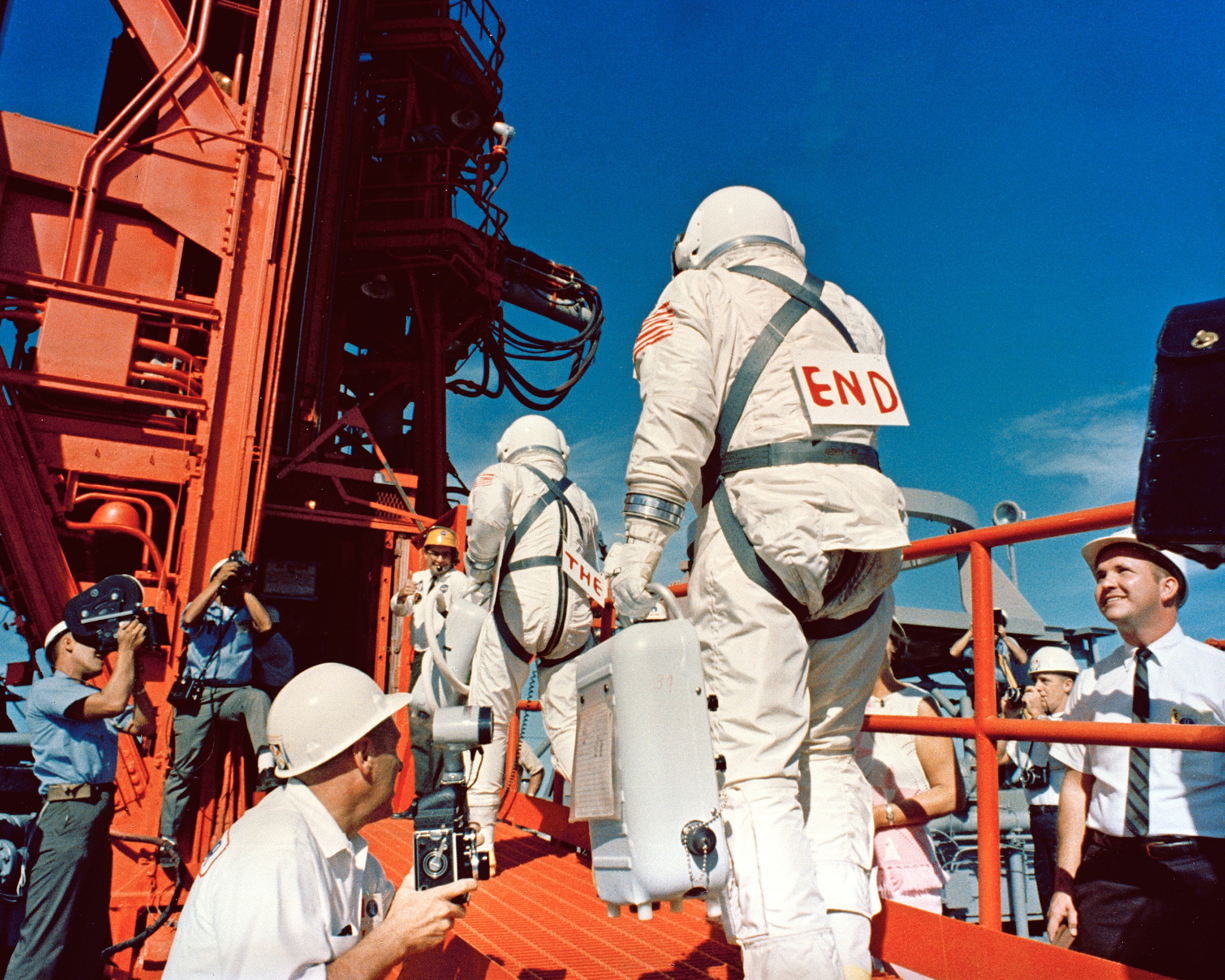
November 11, 1966: Astronauts Lovell and Aldrin commemorate the end of Project Gemini

- After several postponements, Gemini 12, the last of the Project Gemini crewed space missions, was launched from complex 19 at Florida's Cape Kennedy at 3:47 p.m. local time, crewed by two astronauts, U.S. Navy Captain James A. Lovell, Jr., the command pilot, and U.S. Air Force Major Edwin "Buzz" Aldrin, Jr., the pilot. The Gemini Atlas-Agena target vehicle for the mission had been launched from complex 14 at 2:08 p.m.

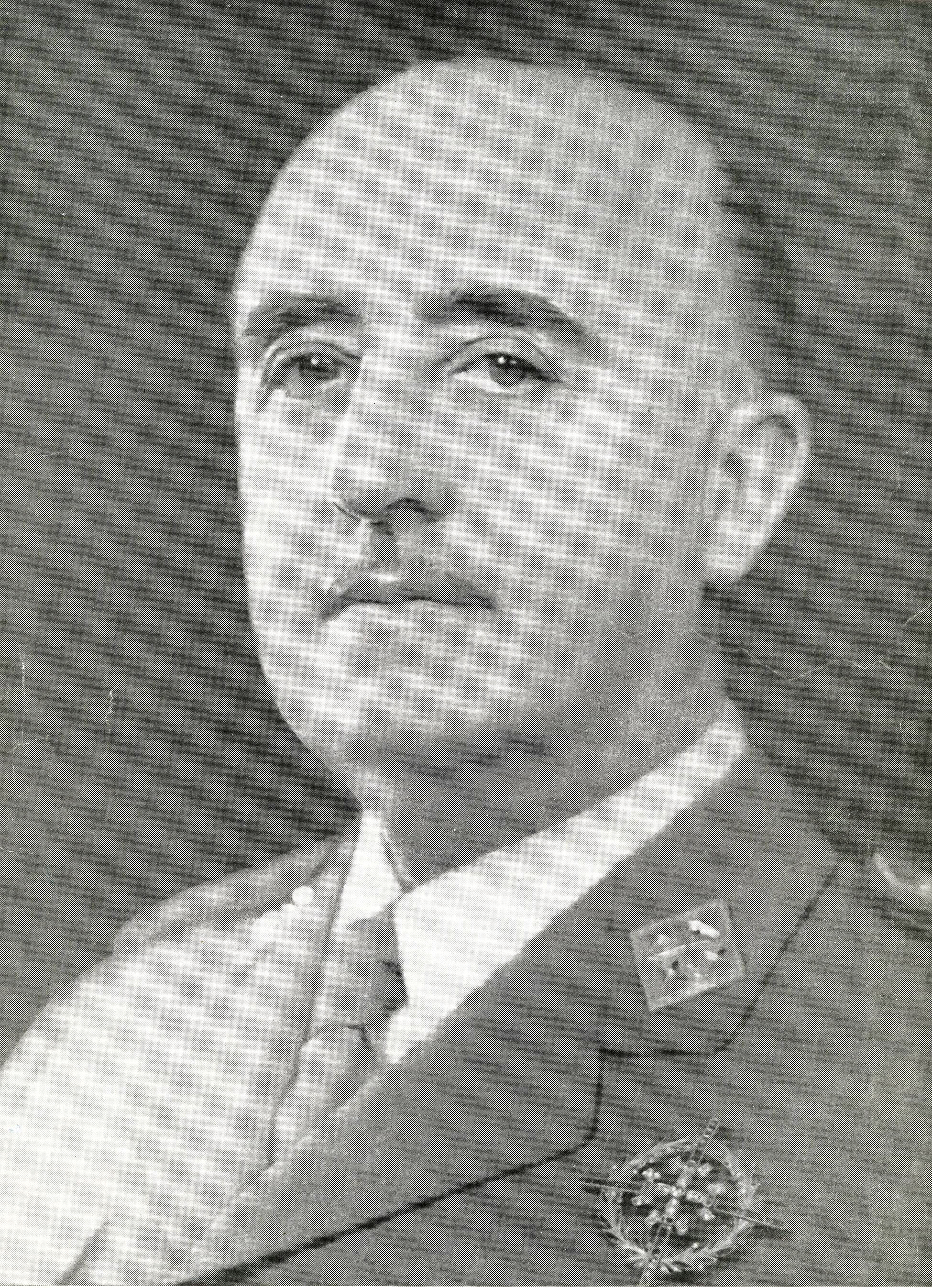
Franco

- Generalissimo Francisco Franco issued a general pardon to everyone who had been convicted of political crimes during the Spanish Civil War, declaring an amnesty for those Spanish residents who had been with the Republicans who had been defeated by Franco's Falangist troops. It was unclear whether the amnesty extended to tens of thousands of Republican fighters who had gone into exile after Franco became Spain's leader. At the same time, Franco's cabinet also approved a decree that would dissolve the "Special Commission on Political Crimes" effective December 31.
- Gary Steven Krist escaped from the Deuel Vocational Institution, a medium-security prison near Tracy, California, where he was serving a sentence for auto theft. He would be recaptured more than two years later, but not before carrying out the bizarre Barbara Mackle kidnapping.
- All 19 people aboard a U.S. Air Force 551st Airborne Early Warning and Control Wing EC-121H Warning Star airplane were killed when it crashed in the Atlantic Ocean off Nantucket, Massachusetts.
- Born: Stewart Wilken, South African serial killer who used the alias "Boetie Boer"; in Boksburg

== November 12, 1966 (Saturday) ==
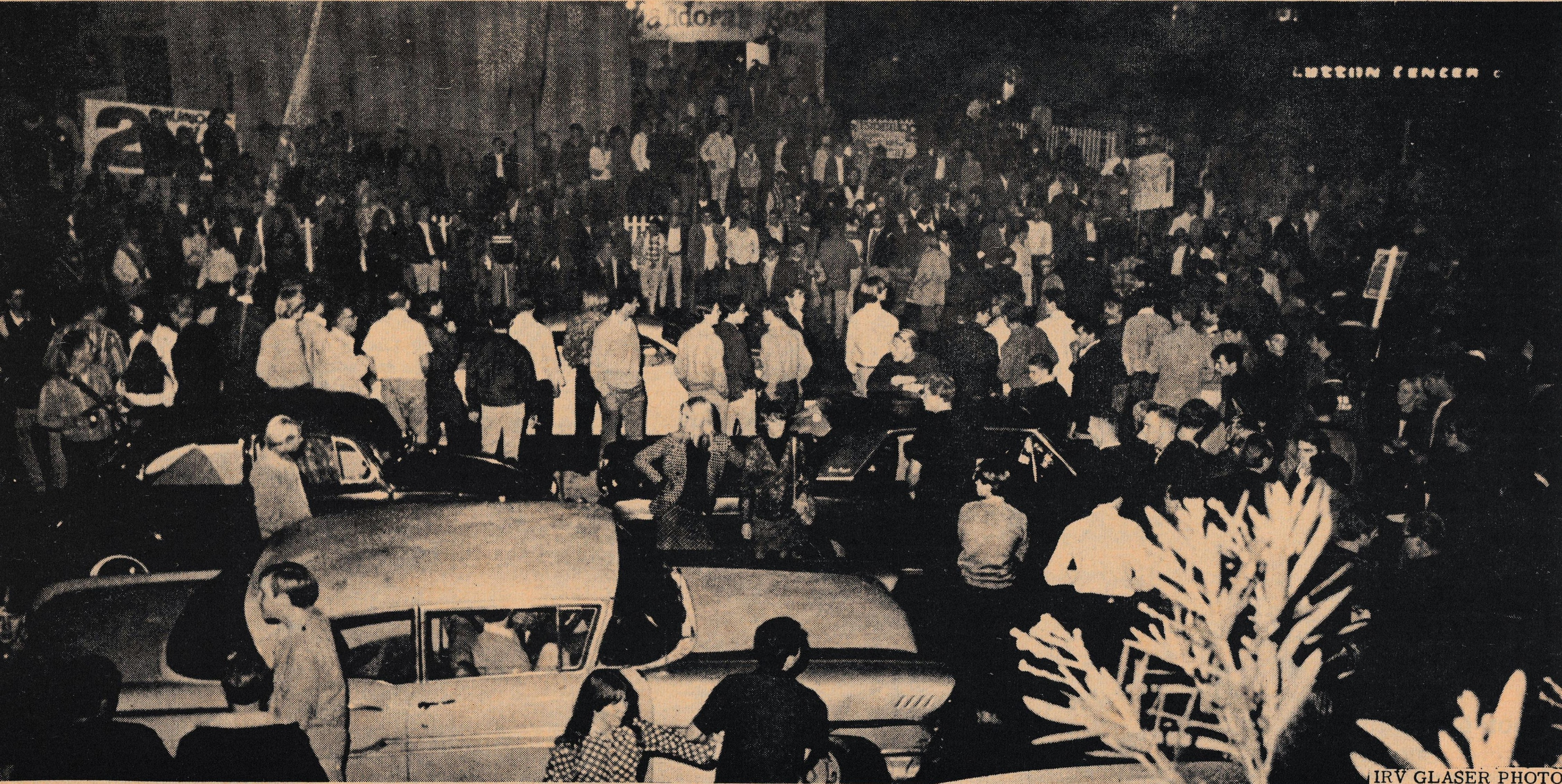
November 12, 1966: Demonstrators protesting outside a nightclub during the curfew riots

- The Sunset Strip curfew riots began in West Hollywood, California as 1,000 demonstrators, many of them hippies and other young people, erupted in protest against the strict 10:00 p.m. curfew and strictly-enforced loitering laws. Earlier in the year, the city council had implemented a handful of measures, including the curfew to prevent people from entering into night clubs late at night. Celebrities, including Jack Nicholson and Peter Fonda joined the protesters in the demonstrations against the city government.
- Inspired by the press coverage of the University of Texas tower shooting, an 18-year-old Robert Benjamin Smith walked into the Rose-Mar College of Beauty in Mesa, Arizona and murdered four women and a 3-year-old girl. Smith told police that "he was inspired by mass murderers Charles Whitman and Richard Speck" who had carried out mass murders earlier the same year. Smith also told police that "he simply sought infamy and wanted to be known and remembered". Police said afterward that if Smith had walked into the shop half an hour later, the death toll would have been much higher when more student beauticians and customers normally would have arrived. He would be convicted of the five murders on October 24, 1967, and sentenced to execution in Arizona's gas chamber, but the conviction would be reversed on appeal. Tried and convicted again, he would be sentenced to life imprisonment in 1972.
- The legend of the "Mothman" began when five grave diggers in Clendenin, West Virginia, said that they had witnessed what "looked like a brown human being flying out of the trees". A similar sighting by another group of people, in another part of West Virginia, would happen three days later.
- A land mine killed three Israeli paratroopers, and injured six other soldiers, as their convoy was driving on patrol north of the town of Arad near the West Bank and the border with Jordan. The incident would lead to an attack by Israel against Jordan.
- A total solar eclipse took place, and was observed by scientists in Peru, Bolivia, Argentina and Brazil. For the first time, photos of the eclipse were taken from outer space as Edwin Aldrin made photographs while the cockpit was open on Gemini 12.
- The first of two periods of standup EVA spacewalks began on Gemini 12 and lasted for 2 hours 29 minutes.
- Died:
  - Don Branson, 46, sprint car racer, was killed in a crash at the Ascot Speedway in Gardena, California
  - Shakeb Jalali, 32, Pakistani poet, committed suicide by throwing himself into the path of a train in the city of Sargodha in Punjab Province.

== November 13, 1966 (Sunday) ==
- Tanks of the Israeli Army swept across the border from Israel and attacked three towns located 2 miles (3.2 km) inside Jordan. Four Royal Jordanian Air Force Hawker Hunter aircraft attacked an Israeli unit that was engaged in blowing up buildings in as-Samu, Jordan, a town that the terrorist group Fatah had used for staging commando attacks into Israel. Israeli Air Force aircraft responded, shot down one of the Jordanian planes and drove off the other three during the dogfight. The other villages attacked by Israel were Hirbeit Karkaz and Jimba. Jordan's ambassador to the United Nations told reporters that 13 Jordanian soldiers and 13 civilians had been killed in the attack, which came the day after four Israeli Army personnel had been killed by a land mine on their side of the border. Prime Minister Levi Eshkol of Israel said later, "We trust that the lesson will not go unheeded in Damascus."
- All 50 people on All Nippon Airways Flight 533 were killed when the NAMC YS-11 turboprop plunged into the Seto Inland Sea as it was attempting to land at the airport at the resort of Matsuyama in Ehime Prefecture. Of the 45 passengers, 22 were newlyweds who had departed from Osaka for their honeymoons. The cause of the accident was never determined.
- During a more than two-hour umbilical EVA on Gemini 12, astronaut Buzz Aldrin attached a 100-foot (30 m) tether from the GATV target vehicle to the spacecraft docking bar. While the tether remained slack, the crew believed that the Gemini craft and the GATV slowly attained gravity-gradient stabilization.
- Died: Dick Atkins, 30, collided with Don Branson's overturned car the previous day

== November 14, 1966 (Monday) ==
- A U.S. Air Force C-141 Starlifter, part of the 86th Military Airlift Squadron and piloted by Captain Howard Geddes, became the first jet aircraft to land in Antarctica, touching down on a runway carved out of the ice, at Williams Field on McMurdo Sound. The jet had completed a roundtrip flight of 2,200 miles (3,500 km) each way to and from Christchurch, New Zealand.
- Jack L. Warner, the co-founder and largest stockholder of Warner Bros. Pictures, signed a contract to sell his one-third interest in the motion picture company to Seven Arts Productions, a Toronto-based distributor of films for television. Warner's 1,573,861 million shares of stock were sold for $20 apiece for a total of $31,477,220.
- Despite having been away from boxing for more than 15 months while recovering from being shot by a police officer, Cleveland Williams fought world heavyweight champion Cassius Clay (later Muhammad Ali) in front of a crowd of 35,460 fight fans at the Houston Astrodome. Williams, who had worked his way back to health after four surgeries, a broken hip and the loss of a kidney, was felled in the third round after one of the most unusual career comebacks in athletic history. Dale Witton, the highway patrolman who had shot Williams in 1964, had been given tickets to two ringside seats by the challenger, who said, "I have no hard feelings for him."
- The Italian cargo ship Marina di Sapri struck the sunken wreckage of the SS Ada, which had gone down on November 6 in the Adriatic Sea, and sank as well.
- The second standup EVA of the Gemini 12 mission lasted 55 minutes, ending at 67 hours 1 minute ground elapsed time.
- Born: Curt Schilling, American baseball pitcher; in Anchorage, Alaska
- Died:
  - Peter Baker, 45, the last British Member of Parliament to be expelled (in 1954) from the House of Commons, died in hospital at Eastbourne after a long illness.
  - Zengo Yoshida, 81, Admiral of the Imperial Navy of Japan and former Japanese War Minister
  - Steingrímur Steinþórsson, 73, 11th Prime Minister of Iceland from 1950 to 1953

== November 15, 1966 (Tuesday) ==
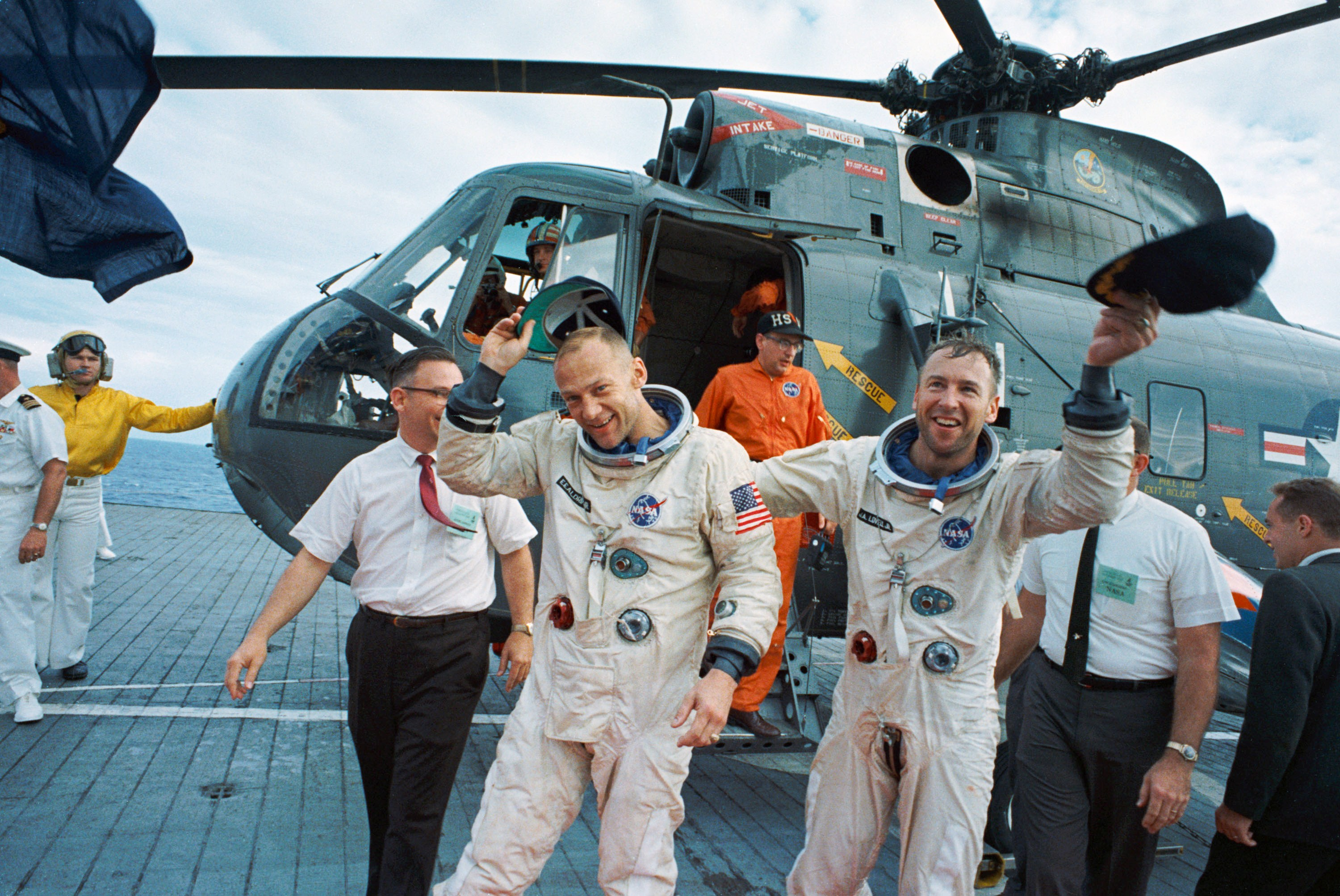
November 15, 1966: Aldrin and Lovell after landing aboard Wasp

- At 2:21 p.m., Gemini 12, with James A. Lovell and Buzz Aldrin, splashed down safely in the Atlantic Ocean, 600 km (370 mi) east of the Bahamas, less than 3 miles (4.8 km) from the prime recovery ship, the aircraft carrier USS Wasp (CV-18), bringing an end to the Gemini program to make way for the Apollo crewed program set to land on the Moon. Both Gemini 12 astronauts, Edwin "Buzz" Aldrin and James Lovell, would fly on Apollo missions.
- The second and most famous "Mothman" sighting took place when a pair of married couples in Point Pleasant, West Virginia reported seeing "a flying man with a 10-foot wingspan who flies after cars at 100 miles per hour". The experience of Steve and Mary Mallette and Roger and Linda Scarberry, along with subsequent sightings, would lead to a 1975 bestselling book by John Keel, The Mothman Prophecies. In 2002, a horror film of the same title would star Richard Gere and Debra Messing as the first people to witness the Mothman.
- The Pan American World Airways Boeing 727-21 cargo aircraft Clipper München, operating as Pan Am Flight 708, crashed in East Germany as it was making its approach to Tegel Airport in West Germany, killing the three crew members, all of whom were Americans. The jet, carrying mail from Frankfurt to West Berlin, was the first airliner to crash while using one of the air corridors that linked West Berlin to the rest of West Germany and went down at a Soviet Army training ground near Dallgow-Döberitz in the Bezirk Potsdam district (now the German state of Brandenburg).
- The low-budget American horror film Manos: The Hands of Fate was released. Produced, written, directed and starring Harold P. Warren, the movie would become a cult classic more than 25 years later as one of the selections for the Comedy Central series Mystery Science Theater 3000.
- Harry Maurice Roberts, the last member of a trio that had murdered three London policemen on August 12, was caught hiding on a farm near the town of Bishop's Stortford in Hertfordshire.
- Born: Rachel True, American television actress (Half & Half); in New York City

== November 16, 1966 (Wednesday) ==
- U.S. doctor Sam Sheppard was acquitted in his second trial for the murder of his pregnant wife in 1954. The jury of seven men and five women spent nearly 12 hours deliberating before returning their verdict of not guilty at 10:18 p.m. Sheppard, who had been in the Ohio State Penitentiary from 1955 until he was allowed to post a bond in 1964 while his conviction was being reviewed, was eligible to have his osteopathic medicine license restored.
- Otto Arosemena Gómez, a Conservative Party candidate, was sworn into office as the new President of Ecuador by a 40–35 vote of the nation's Constituent Assembly, defeating Radical Liberal Party challenger Raúl Clemente Huerta. Arosemena, who succeeded Clemente Yerovi, would serve as a caretaker President until September 1, 1968.
- In order to help pay for an estimated US$800 million for reconstruction from flooding, the cabinet of Prime Minister Aldo Moro of Italy voted for a 10 percent increase in income taxes for one year. The tax boost was expected to raise $264,000,000 and was supplemented by a 6 cent per gallon increase on the price of gasoline.
- Maurice J. Raffensperger of NASA announced the new criteria for design of an "interim space station" for the U.S., the Orbital Workshop, with a goal of launch by the beginning of 1971. The station would need to be capable of spending at least two years in low Earth orbit and created at a cost of no more than $200 million, possibly by using a spare S-IVB stage that could be "dry-launched" without major structural changes, along with a flight-qualified Apollo vehicle and a Manned Orbiting Laboratory hardware capable of one-year operation. For the second year, a long-duration "developmental systems" module would be attached to the original space station structure.
- In a major AAP mission planning session at Houston, NASA officials George M. Low and Robert F. Thompson of Manned Space Center, and Eberhard F. M. Rees and Leland F. Belew of Manned Spaceflight Center, established a joint approach for the first four Apollo Applications missions. SAA 209 and 210 would be primarily a crewed Workshop operation and SAA 211 and 212 would be a 56-day mission for orbital assembly operations and solar astronomy.
- The Temptations released their Greatest Hits album which went on to be Billboard Year-End R&B album of 1967.

== November 17, 1966 (Thursday) ==
- The Earth's orbit took it into the path of the debris of Comet Tempel–Tuttle, providing the most spectacular display of meteors in 133 years. The Leonids shower peaked with a 20-minute display that began at 1155 UTC (4:55 in the morning at the Kitt Peak National Observatory in Arizona), where the meteors passed through the atmosphere at the rate of 40 per second. The spectacle, anticipated as the "Show of the Century" and the largest shower of record since the Leonids of November 12 and 13, 1833. However, overcast skies blocked the view for millions of other observers in the United States and Japan. The 1966 event is still described as "the last primary maximum" of the Leonids.
- Reita Faria, a medical student who had won the Femina Miss India title, was crowned Miss World in London, becoming the first person from India to win the title. Faria told reporters that she had never appeared in a bathing suit prior to the world pageant. The 1966 competition marked the first time that a Communist nation sent a contestant, and Mikica Marinovic of Yugoslavia was the runner up.
- Don't Drink the Water, the first full-length play written by comedian Woody Allen, premiered on Broadway, opening at the Morosco Theatre. After a run of 598 performances on stage, it would be made into a 1969 feature film and later as a 1994 made-for-television movie.
- The UN General Assembly passed Resolution 2152 (XXI), creating the United Nations Industrial Development Organization (UNIDO).
- Born:
  - Jeff Buckley, American singer-songwriter and son of Tim Buckley (d. 1997); in Anaheim, California
  - Daisy Fuentes, Cuban-American television star; in Havana
  - Sophie Marceau, French film actress; in Paris

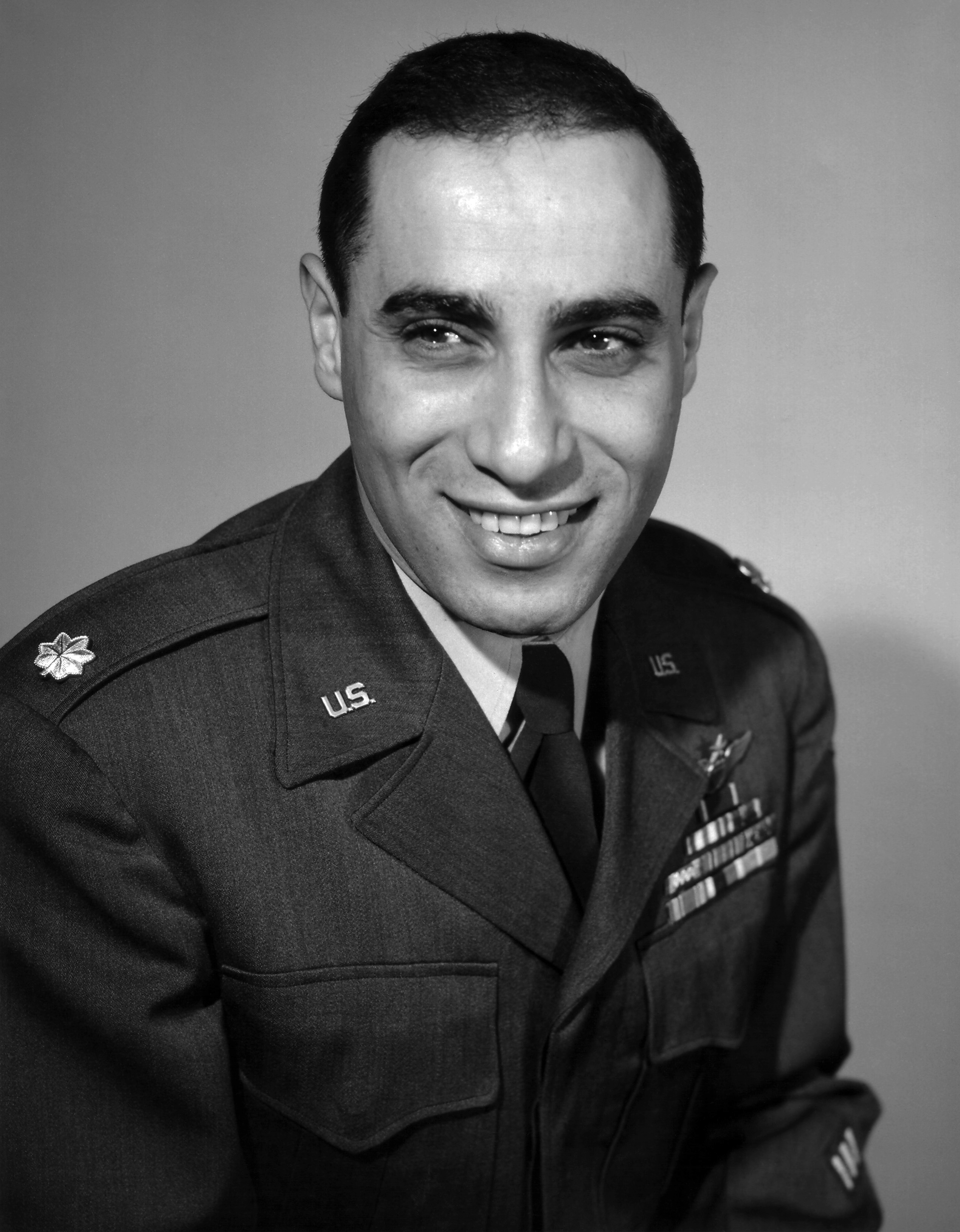
Colonel Jabara

- Died:
  - U.S. Air Force Colonel James "Jabby" Jabara, 43, American aviator, the first American jet fighter ace, was killed in a car crash along with his 16-year-old daughter, when the car in which he was riding overturned on the Florida Turnpike. Jabara, a veteran of World War II, the Korean War and the Vietnam War, had three distinguished flying crosses, 19 air medals and two distinguished service crosses.
  - Adem Reka, 38, Albanian dockworker who was posthumously proclaimed a "Hero of Socialist Labor" in Albania, was killed saving his fellow workers from a loading crane vessel that capsized in a violent storm. A statue would be erected in his honor at Durrës, pilgrimages were made to his shrine, and a postage stamp would be issued by the government for Reka, who was virtually unknown outside of the Communist nation.

== November 18, 1966 (Friday) ==
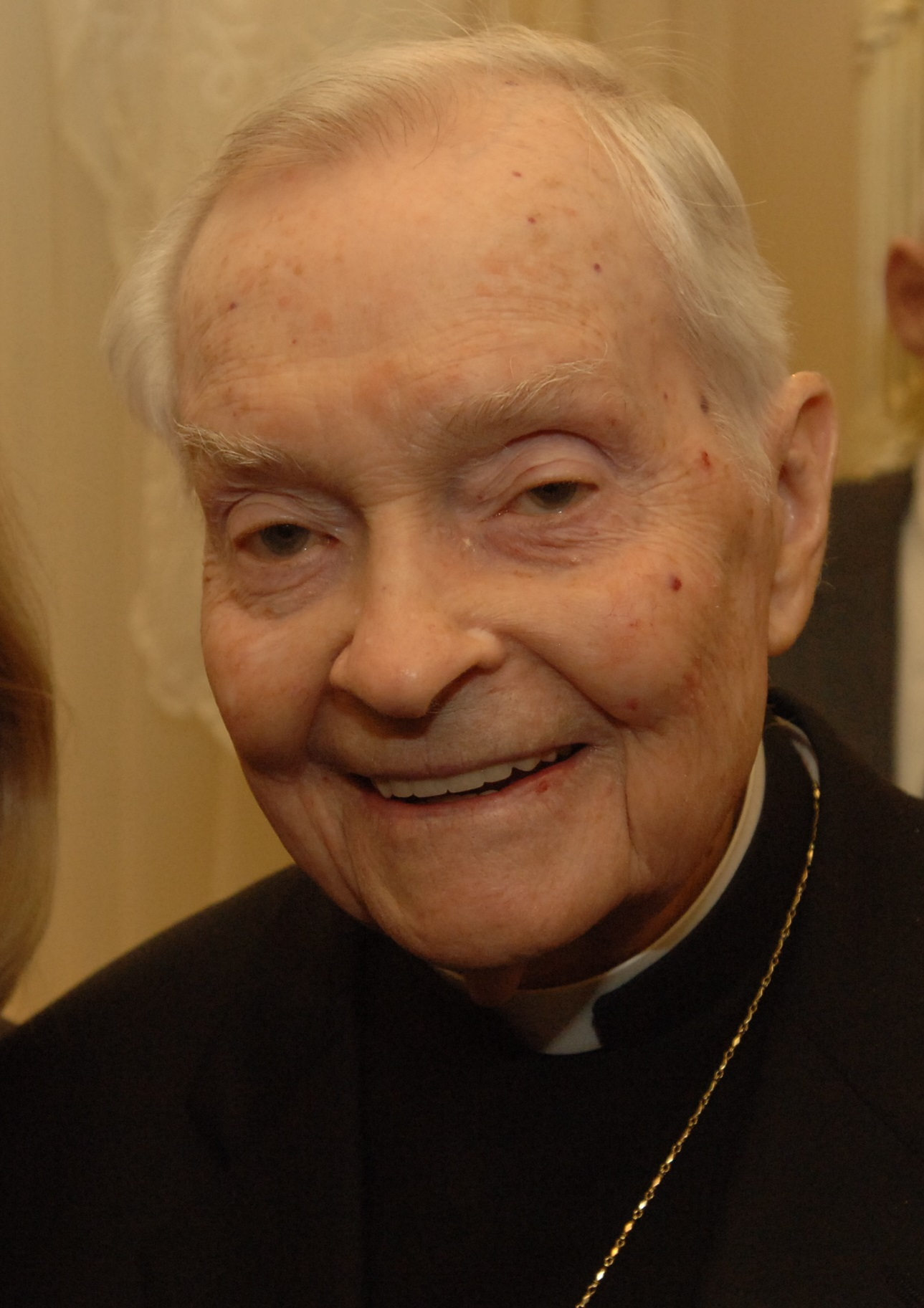
Archbishop Hannan

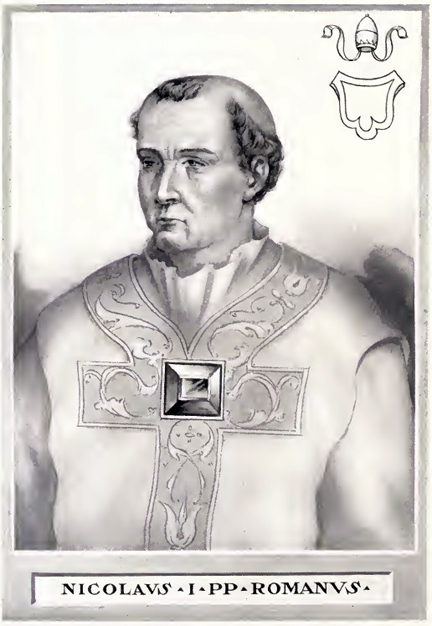
Pope Nicholas I

- Roman Catholics in the United States would no longer be required to abstain from meat on Fridays, as a national conference of U.S. Roman Catholic cardinals, archbishops and bishops voted in Washington to revoke a requirement of abstinence that had been in effect for 11 centuries. As part of the recognition of Friday as a day of penance, Pope Nicholas I had decreed in the 9th century that adherents to Roman Catholic faith would be required to abstain from the eating of meat, although the consumption of fish on Fridays was permitted. Friday, December 2, 1966, would mark the first day that 45,000,000 American Roman Catholics could consume beef, chicken, pork, or other meats without violating Church doctrine. Philip Hannan, Archbishop of New Orleans, and Clarence George Issenmann, the Bishop of Cleveland, jointly made the announcement at a press conference.
- Baseball pitching legend Sandy Koufax surprised the sporting world when he confirmed a report by San Diego Union reporter Phil Collier that he was retiring from the sport at the height of his career, because of severe arthritis in his elbow. The story was front-page news, particularly in papers that covered Koufax's Los Angeles Dodgers team. Koufax, at the time the highest paid pitcher in the game's history, told a press conference, "I've had a few too many shots and too many pills because of my arm trouble." For the preceding 15 months, Collier had been keeping the secret that Koufax planned to quit baseball following the 1966 season, and Koufax returned the favor by giving Collier the chance to break the story.
- U.S. Air Force Major William J. Knight flew the North American X-15 to a record speed of Mach 6.33 (4,250 mph, 6,840 km/h). Major Knight began the flight after he had climbed to an altitude of 98,000 feet (30,000 m), after the X-15 had been released by a B-52 over Mud Lake, Nevada, and covered a distance of 637 miles (1,025 km) in nine minutes.
- J. Pemble Field, Jr., Director, Saturn/Apollo Applications Control, notified program officials in NASA Headquarters of Acting Director David M. Jones' decision to designate AAP missions in numerical sequence, starting with AAP-1 (rather than the former designation of S/AA-209).

== November 19, 1966 (Saturday) ==
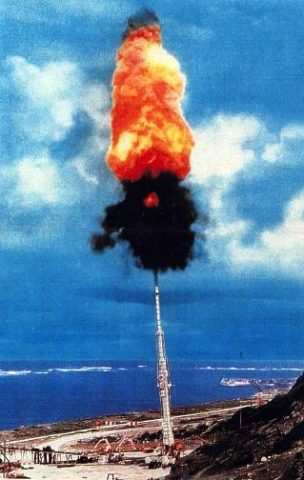
The HARP gun

- Project HARP, the High Altitude Research Project and a collaboration of the U.S. and Canadian armed forces, achieved its highest success when it used a large cannon ("the HARP gun") to fire a projectile into outer space, though not into Earth orbit. The "shell" was the Martlet 3 rocket, and the cannon, designed by Gerald Bull, sent it to an altitude of 111 miles (179 kilometers). As a military historian would note in 2011, "It was, and remains, a world record for any fired projectile."

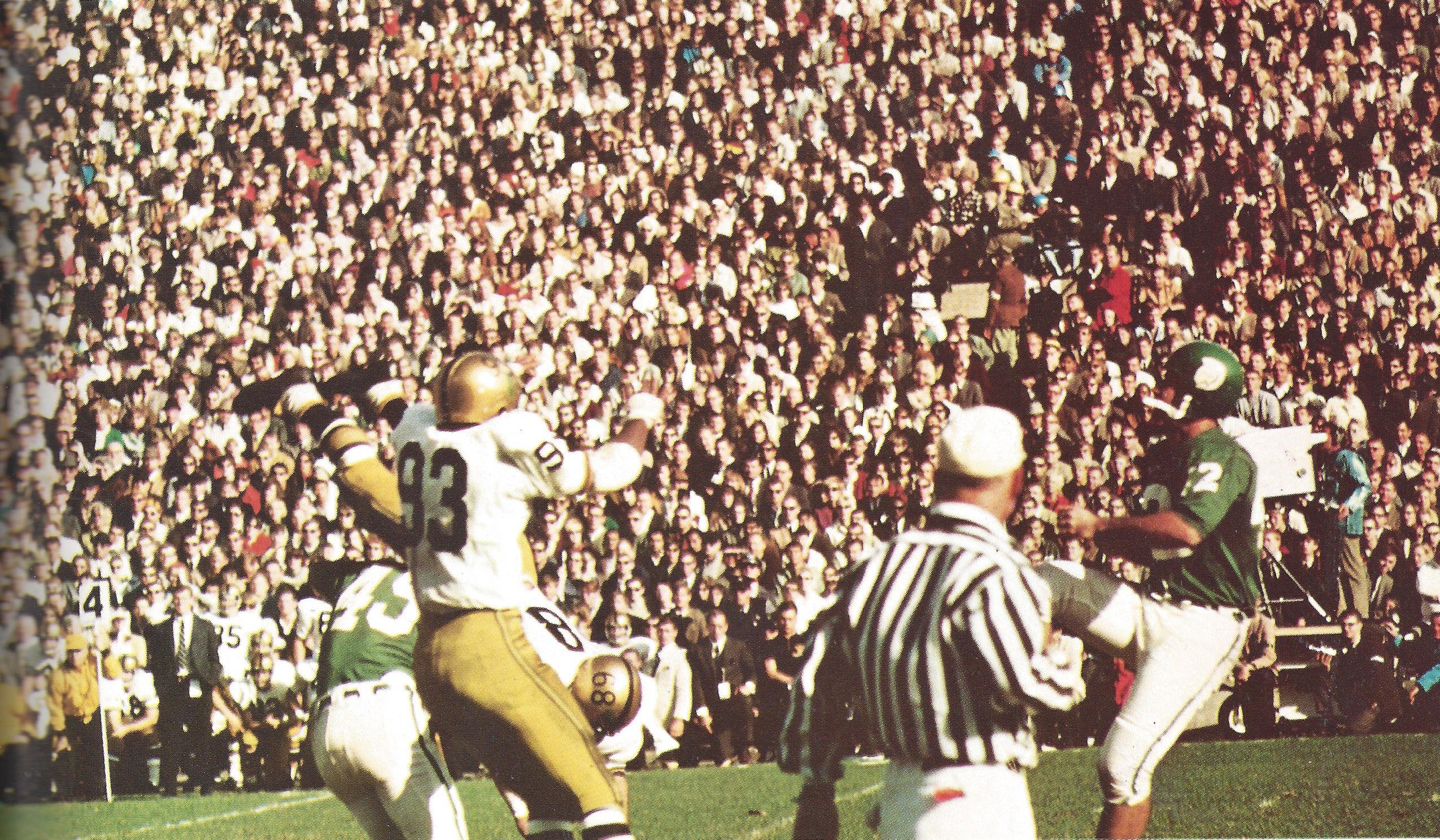
The 10–10 tie

- Billed as "The Game of the Century" for college football, the meeting between the nation's two unbeaten and untied teams, #1 ranked Notre Dame Fighting Irish and the #2 ranked Michigan State Spartans, ended anti-climatically when the teams played to a 10–10 tie. Televised nationally, and witnessed by more viewers than any American football game, college or pro, before that time, the game ended in controversy. Notre Dame took over on its own 30-yard line with a little more than a minute left to play, and instead of risking a turnover, Notre Dame's coach ordered the team to run out the clock to preserve the tie, rather than to go for the win.
- A planned invasion of Haiti by several hundred well-armed exiles was halted at the last moment after an intervention by the United States government. The force, led by Rolando Masferrer and Father Jean Baptiste Georges, was preparing to embark from Florida and was ready to overthrow the government of Haitian dictator Francois "Papa Doc" Duvalier, and had raised $300,000 in donations, filled several warehouses in Miami with weapons, and had "a number of ships and four or five planes including one B-26". The B-26 bomber was prepared to bomb the capital, Port-au-Prince, in advance of the invasion. U.S. government intervention had initially been held off because the exiles' plan was for "converting Haiti to a base for Cuban exile operations against Fidel Castro's communist Cuba".
- More than 40 people were killed near Durban, South Africa, when their bus plummeted 200 feet (61 m) down an embankment and landed in the rain-swollen Mdloti River. Another 31 were injured but rescued alive from the crash.
- Born:
  - Gail Devers, American track and field athlete who overcame Graves' disease to become the women's world champion in both the 100-meter dash and the 100-meter hurdles, winning three Olympic gold medals, and world championships in 1993, 1995, 1997 and 1999; in Seattle
  - Shmuley Boteach, American rabbi and author best known for the book Kosher Sex: A Recipe for Passion and Intimacy (1999) and the film Kosher Jesus (2012); in Los Angeles
- Died:
  - Mendel Balberyszski, 72, Lithuanian-Polish historian and survivor of the Holocaust
  - Arthur Haynes, 52, English comedian, died from a heart attack.

== November 20, 1966 (Sunday) ==
- Cabaret, one of the most popular musicals on Broadway, opened at the Broadhurst Theatre. In its initial run, the Tony Award-winning Kander and Ebb production would have 1,165 performances, and a 1998 revival would be staged 2,377 times.
- In what would later be described as "the first instance of a spacecraft imaging an archaeological site on the Moon", Lunar Orbiter 2 photographed Ranger 8 and its impact point in Mare Tranquillitatis (the "Sea of Tranquility").
- Photographs were taken by Lunar Orbiter 2 of the "Blair Cuspids", "an unusual arrangement of seven spirelike objects of varying heights" at the western edge of the Mare Tranquillitatis, and a pattern that is cited in pseudoscience as the product of extraterrestrial intelligence. Reactions to the photo varied.
- In Cuba, the Soviet Union won the 17th Chess Olympiad in Havana for its eighth consecutive gold medal, with 39½ points to 34½ for the silver medalist, the United States. Tigran Petrosian of Russia had the highest winning percentage (88.46%) from 11½ wins out of 13 games, narrowly edging Bobby Fischer of the U.S. (88.23%) with 15 points out of 17 games.

== November 21, 1966 (Monday) ==
- The first international computer chess competition between the United States and the Soviet Union began between the Institute for Theoretical and Experimental Physics at Moscow, and Stanford University in Palo Alto, California. The Soviet Minsk M-20 computer had a program developed by a team led by Georgy Adelson-Velsky and Vladimir Arlazarov; the Kotok-McCarthy program, created by Alan Kotok and John McCarthy, used an IBM 7090 computer. Four games were played simultaneously between the two computers, and the moves were communicated by telegram. It would not be until March 10, 1967, that the first result could be reported, when ITEP checkmated Kotok-McCarthy in 19 moves; eventually, with two wins and two draws, ITEP defeated Stanford, 3–1.
- In Togo, the nation's army crushed an attempted coup against the government of President Nicolas Grunitzky. Calling themselves "Congress Unite Togolaise", a 25-member group of insurgents seized the radio station in the capital, Lomé. Noe Kutuklui, the coup leader and the group's spokesman, interrupted the music and told listeners, "The revolution has just begun. The Togolese people want their rights. The people want the immediate dissolution of the unpopular Grunitzky government and of parliament," then promised that "new and democratic elections will be held." By noon, the Togolese Army had taken back the station and Lieutenant Colonel Etienne Eyadema called on demonstrators to "go back to work".
- Johns Hopkins Hospital of Baltimore, Maryland, announced that it had opened its Gender Identity Clinic in July, and had started accepting applications for the first sex reassignment surgery in the United States. The announcement came as a front-page story by reporter Thomas Buckley on the front page of The New York Times.
- Born: Troy Aikman, American NFL quarterback and member of the Pro Football and the College Football Halls of Fame; in West Covina, California

== November 22, 1966 (Tuesday) ==
- All 25 passengers and three crew of an Aden Airways DC-3 were killed in the assassination of Amir Mohammed bin Said, the deputy ruler of the Sultanate of Wahidi in the Federation of South Arabia. A terrorist bomb exploded in the baggage compartment of the airplane before it took off from Maifa'a on a flight to Khormaksar. When the plane reached an altitude of 6,000 feet (1,800 m), the bomb detonated.

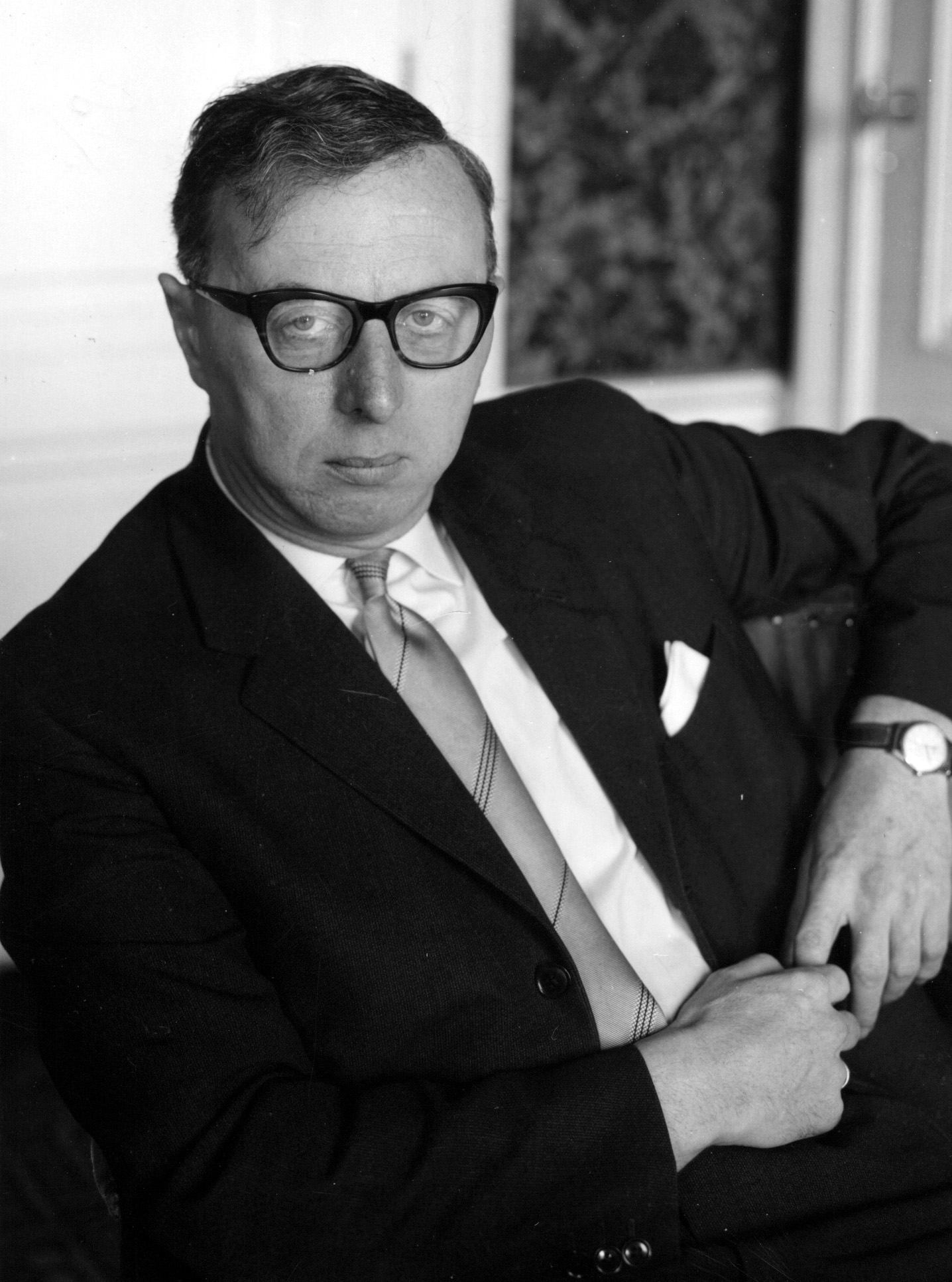
Zijlstra

- Economics professor Jelle Zijlstra became the 42nd Prime Minister of the Netherlands after the October 14 vote of no confidence and subsequent resignation of Prime Minister Jo Cals.
- Died:
  - Moises Frumencio da Costa Gomez, 59, the first Prime Minister of the Netherlands Antilles, from 1951 to 1954.
  - Émile Drain, 76, French film actor

== November 23, 1966 (Wednesday) ==
- A group of businessmen in Seattle held a press conference to announce their plans to create a 976-acre (1.525-square-mile) artificial island, followed by a micronation called "Taluga", on the Cortes Bank, 97 miles off of the coast of San Diego, California. The plans of the O.S.D. Company were to spend $8,800,000 to transport rock and topsoil from Mexico to the site, followed by another $5,000,000 for infrastructure and buildings. The new nation, placed outside of U.S. territorial waters, would have a capital ("Aurora"), and a resort area ("Triana") and a port ("Bonaventura"). The plans for Taluga and similar artificial island ventures would become moot in April when a federal district attorney, Edwin Miller, pointed out that the Cortes Bank was on the continental shelf off the shore of the United States, and therefore American territory under the Rivers and Harbors Act of 1899.
- Smog began to cover New York City and its surrounding areas during the Thanksgiving holiday weekend, filling the city's air with damaging levels of several toxic pollutants.
- Born: Vincent Cassel, French film actor, son of Jean-Pierre Cassel; in Paris
- Died:
  - Seán T. O'Kelly, 84, the second President of Ireland, who presided from 1945 to 1959
  - Alvin Langdon Coburn, 84, American-born Welsh photographer

== November 24, 1966 (Thursday) ==
- All 82 people on board TABSO Flight 101, a Bulgarian airliner, were killed when the Ilyushin Il-18B crashed in the foothills of the Little Carpathians, two minutes after takeoff from Bratislava in Czechoslovakia. The turboprop plane was partway through its multi-stop flight from Sofia to East Berlin, and was between Budapest and Prague when bad weather forced it to make an unscheduled landing at Bratislava. Among the dead were 50-year-old Honduran writer and journalist Ramón Amaya Amador and flight attendant Svetla Georgieva, who 18 days earlier had married the Bulgarian sports official Ivan Slavkov. The crash remains the deadliest aviation accident in the history of Slovakia.
- The Beatles began recording their classic Sgt. Pepper's Lonely Hearts Club Band album, starting with "Strawberry Fields Forever".

== November 25, 1966 (Friday) ==
- During an ongoing smog event, New York City was placed under a "first-stage alert" by New York Governor Nelson Rockefeller because of heavy air pollution that had been held over the metropolitan area by a stagnant air mass. Residents were ordered to drive "only when necessary", to maintain minimum temperatures in all buildings heated by oil or coal, to avoid open fires and to not run incinerators until the alert ended. The alert was triggered by smog that had risen to 400% above normal levels on Thanksgiving Day, measured at 0.5 parts per million of sulphur dioxide, nine parts per million of carbon monoxide and 7.5 parts per million of haze for four consecutive hours. The days of smog were later credited with causing 169 additional deaths in New York City, lower than the estimate for a prior period in November 1953.
- Born: Billy Burke, American film and television actor; in Bellingham, Washington

== November 26, 1966 (Saturday) ==
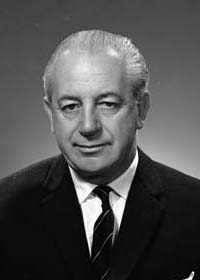
Australian PM Holt

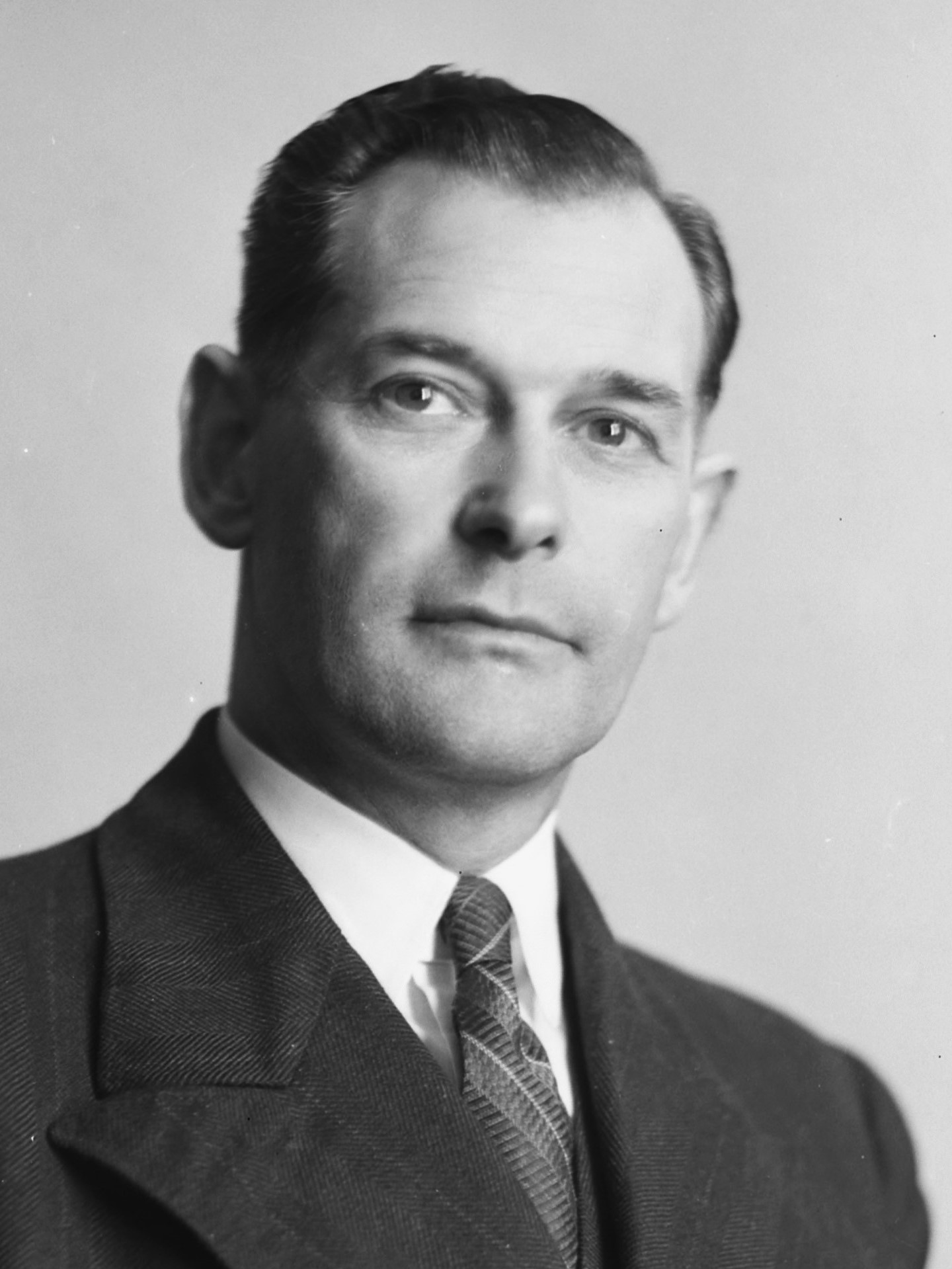
New Zealand PM Holyoake

- In the Australian federal election, viewed as a popular referendum on Australia's involvement in the Vietnam War, Prime Minister Harold Holt stayed in office as the coalition of his Liberal Party and the Australian Country Party increased its majority in the 124-member House of Representatives. With a gain of 10 seats, the Liberal/Country coalition had 82 seats, while the Australian Labor Party of Arthur Calwell lost nine.
- On the same day, in the New Zealand parliamentary election, Keith Holyoake remained Prime Minister, as his National Party lost only one seat. The National Party retained 44 of the 80 seats in the New Zealand House of Representatives, and the Labour Party of Norman Kirk had no change, with 35 seats. For the first time in more than 20 years, a third party, the Social Credit Party, had a parliamentary seat, as Vernon Cracknell took the electorate of Hobson from National's Logan Sloane.
- Led by Prime Minister Lester B. Pearson, the Cabinet of Canada voted to create the Order of Canada. Pearson would state later that "I pointed out to my colleagues that nearly all countries of the world, excepting Switzerland, had some system of honors and awards" for civilians. Although the Canada Medal had been created in 1943 for that purpose, it had never been awarded (and never would be, after the Cabinet voted to abolish it).
- At Empire Stadium in Vancouver, the 54th Grey Cup was "Roughriders vs. Rough Riders" as the Saskatchewan Roughriders broke a 14–14 tie in the final quarter with two touchdowns and a single for a 29–14 win over the Ottawa Rough Riders, winning the Cup for the first time in team history.
- Born: Garcelle Beauvais, Haitian-born American television actress known for The Jamie Foxx Show; in Saint-Marc
- Died:
  - Norval Baptie, 87, Canadian-born American professional skater. In 1912, he held the world records for speed skating at 440 yards, one-half mile, and one mile (2 minutes, 8 seconds).
  - Siegfried Kracauer, 77, German philosopher and cultural theorist
  - Oliver Morton Dickerson, 91, American historian

== November 27, 1966 (Sunday) ==
- Voters in Uruguay turned out for what the Associated Press called "just about the most complicated election Latin America has yet seen", a referendum on the nation's constitution. In addition to deciding among five possibilities (keeping the existing council of government, or four separate presidential proposals marked by an orange, yellow, pink or gray ballot), the voters also had to decide on an alternative set of leaders, depending on which system went into place. This meant voting for nine members of the National Council, if the council system remained, as well as for a President of Uruguay in case a presidential system was approved. Moreover, the voters had to pick their representatives in both houses of the legislature, provincial executives and legislators, mayors and local officials, and a ballot had to have at least 12 choices in order to be valid. Finally, the vote would not count unless at least 35% of the registered voters participated and unless one of the choices won an absolute majority. Ultimately, the old system was rejected, the "Reforma Naranja" (orange proposal for a presidential system) got 65% of the vote, and Óscar Diego Gestido was selected as the nation's first President since 1951.
- The Washington Redskins defeated the New York Giants 72–41 in the highest scoring game in NFL history. Washington led 13–0 after one quarter, 34–14 at halftime, and 48–28 after three quarters. The 113 points came from 16 touchdowns, 14 conversions and, with three seconds left, a field goal by Charlie Gogolak, on orders from Redskins coach Otto Graham. "In a crazy game like this," Graham said, "what's another three points?"
- William J. Barnes shot a rookie Philadelphia policeman, Walter Barclay, Jr., during a burglary, leaving Barclay partially paralyzed. Almost 41 years later, after Barclay's death from a urinary tract infection on August 19, 2007, Barnes would be indicted for murdering a police officer. A jury would acquit Barnes in 2010, concluding that the prosecution failed to prove a direct link between the 1966 shooting and the 2007 infection.
- Reclusive billionaire Howard Hughes moved from Boston to Las Vegas, where he leased the top two floors of the Desert Inn. Never venturing downstairs, Hughes would buy the hotel in 1967 and live there for several years before moving onward.

== November 28, 1966 (Monday) ==
- King Ntare V of Burundi was overthrown by his Prime Minister, Army Captain Michel Micombero, who had helped him plot the coup that deposed Ntare's father, King Mwambutsa IV, less than five months earlier. The 18-year-old King and the 26-year-old Prime Minister had been friends when Micombero suggested that they take over the nation together. Micombero, a member of the Tutsi tribe, abolished the monarchy and declared himself to be the first President of Burundi. He would then begin a campaign to purge all Hutu tribesmen from the government, ultimately leading to the First Burundian Genocide. The coup was bloodless, as King Ntare V was out of the country, visiting Kinshasa in the Congo.
- Truman Capote's Black and White Ball, which would be referred to in 1999, by The New York Times, as one of "10 Parties That Shook The Century", was held in New York City at the Grand Ballroom of the Plaza Hotel. The 480 guests at the masquerade ball included matron of honor Katharine Graham, Frank Sinatra and Mia Farrow, Jacob Javits, Norman Mailer, Joan Fontaine, Penelope Tree, Lauren Bacall, and three daughters of U.S. Presidents (Alice Roosevelt Longworth, Lynda Bird Johnson and Margaret Truman Daniel). More than 40 years later, the event would be recounted in a book entitled Party of the Century.
- The Soyuz program began in the Soviet Union with the unmanned launch of a new series of space vehicles. In order to disguise the mission's true purpose, the launch was initially referred to as Kosmos 133. Eventually, the first capsule would be automatically destroyed in orbit after experiencing problems with its orientation system. Nearly fifty years later, Soyuz rockets would continue to be flown, by the Russian Space Agency, as a shuttle to the International Space Station.

== November 29, 1966 (Tuesday) ==
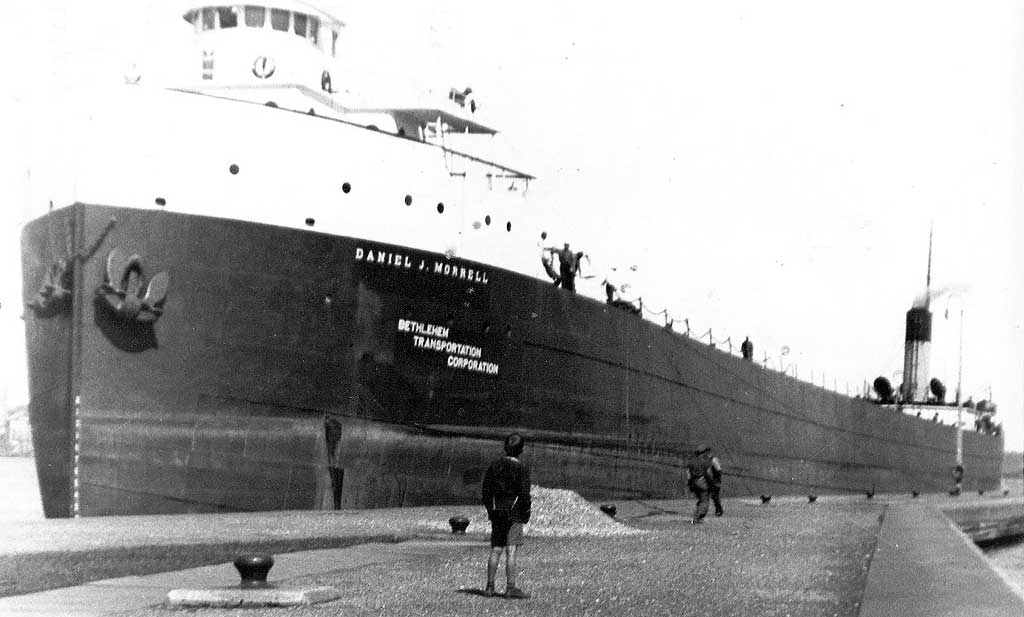
SS Daniel J. Morrell

- The Great Lakes ore freighter SS Daniel J. Morrell sank in a storm on Lake Huron, killing 28 of its 29 crewmen. Gale-force winds broke the 600-foot (180 m) ship into two sections at 2:30 in the morning near Harbor Beach, Michigan, before a distress call could be sent. Dennis Hale, the lone survivor, was rescued after 36 hours in a life raft during near freezing weather after the ship failed to arrive as scheduled. He and three other crewmen had been the only ones able to get onto a life raft before the Morrell sank, but his companions died of hypothermia.

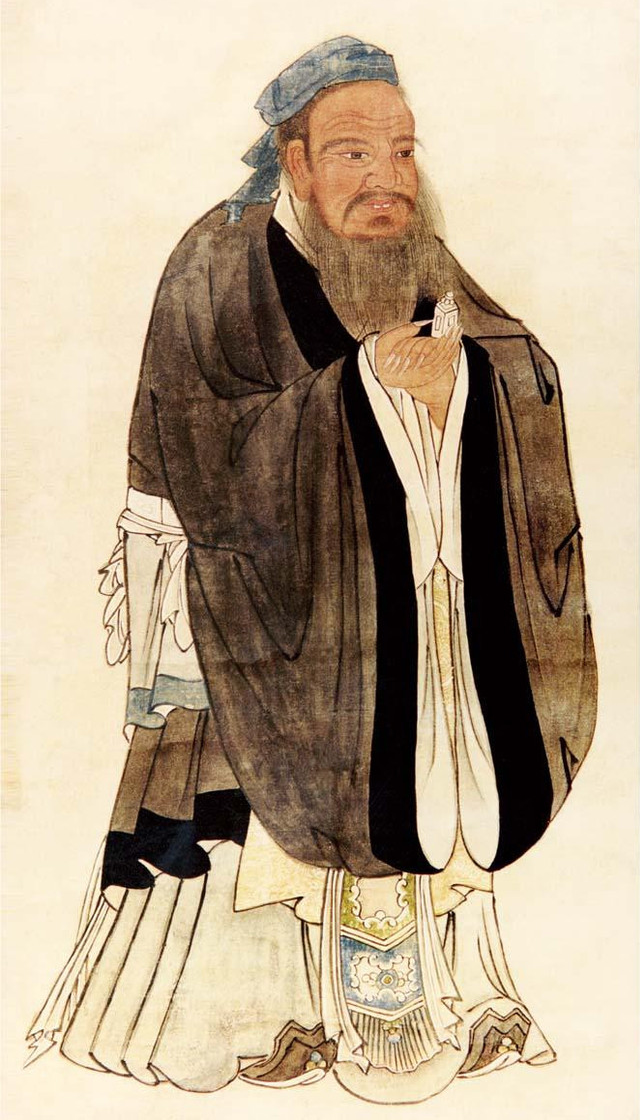
Confucius (551 BC–479 BC)

- Twenty-four centuries after his death in 479 BC, the tomb of the Chinese philosopher Confucius (K'ung Fu-tzu) was destroyed by members of the Red Guards in Qufu in China's Shandong Province. The teachings of Confucius had come under criticism during the Cultural Revolution as a symbol of China's feudal past, and the students destroyed his statue and a memorial tablet, then dug up his grave "only to find nothing inside it".

== November 30, 1966 (Wednesday) ==
- The existence of "Gatorade" was revealed to readers of the Miami Herald by sports columnist Neil Amdur, after Amdur had noticed that the University of Florida Gators football team had been drinking from what appeared to be milk cartons. Surprised, Amdur asked coach Ray Graves, "Are you giving your players milk?" and Graves showed him the beverage and said, "No. We've been fooling around with this stuff for a while now," then told him about the invention of Florida medical professor Robert Cade. Days after the game, Amdur's story, headlined "Florida's Pause That Refreshes: 'Nip of Gatorade'". The story was soon spread across the U.S. by United Press International about the team's "bitter beverage... designed to keep the players from wearing down as they lose body fluid on a hot day". The beverage itself would be marketed nationwide in 1967.
- The United States, South Vietnam, and their other allies in the Vietnam War agreed to a proposal from the Viet Cong and from North Vietnam for three cease fires to coincide with holidays. All fighting would halt from 7:00 a.m., Christmas Eve, until 7:00 a.m. on December 26, as well as from the morning of New Year's Eve until the morning of January 2, 1967. In addition, there would be a four-day ceasefire during the 1967 Tết holidays, celebrated in both North Vietnam and South Vietnam, that marked the traditional start of the Vietnamese new year, with a truce to last between February 8 and February 12, 1967. A similar cease-fire a year later, during the Tết holiday of 1968, would be broken by the Viet Cong during the Tet Offensive.
- At a meeting of the American Medical Association in Las Vegas, Dr. Ralph Greenson, a psychiatry professor at UCLA, told his fellow physicians of a university survey that found that more than 100 people wanted to change their gender. "What is shocking," said Dr. Greenson, "is that this is more widespread than was believed." He also noted that American males were becoming "indifferent to sex", blaming the increased assertiveness of women as something that "repulses some males". "It's horrifying," he told his audience, "a danger to the future of the human race. Our only hope is that basic instincts will eventually win out, that a true equality of the sexes will emerge, and sex will be fun again."
- Barbados was granted independence from the United Kingdom after 341 years, following the passage of the Barbados Independence Act 1966. Present at the flag raising ceremonies in Bridgetown were Prince Edward, Duke of Kent, appearing on behalf of his cousin, Queen Elizabeth II, and Earl Warren, Chief Justice of the United States Supreme Court. Prime Minister Errol Barrow said that he wanted his Caribbean island nation to be the first British Commonwealth Member to join the Organization of American States.
- NASA released three high resolution photographs, taken by Lunar Explorer 2, that showed the depth of lunar craters, giving an unprecedented "bird's-eye view" that had been taken on November 23 of details of the Copernicus crater. The crater itself, 60 miles (97 km) in diameter and 2 miles (3.2 km) deep, can be seen clearly from the Earth with binoculars. The photos also showed the Montes Carpatus mountain range and the Gay-Lussac promontory.
- NASA Headquarters announced the appointment of Charles W. Mathews, Gemini Program Manager at MSC, to the post of Director of Saturn/Apollo Applications, replacing Acting Director David M. Jones. Mathews assumed direction of the agency's effort to use Apollo vehicles to extend scientific and technical exploration of space.
- Born:
  - Andy Parsons, English comedian and writer; in Weymouth, Dorset
  - David Nicholls, English novelist; in Eastleigh, Hampshire
