= Vladimir Arlazarov =

Russian computer scientist

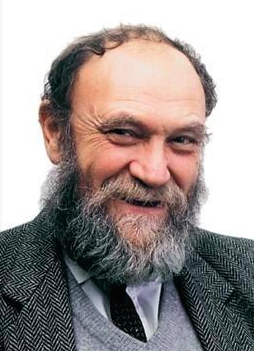
Vladimir L’vovich Arlazarov

Vladimir L’vovich Arlazarov (Russian: Арлазаров Владимир Львович) is a Russian computer scientist born in Moscow.

== Research work ==
In 1965 at Alexander Kronrod's laboratory at the Moscow Institute for Theoretical and Experimental Physics (ITEP), Vladimir Arlazarov co-developed the ITEP Chess Program, together with Georgy Adelson-Velsky, Anatoly Uskov and Alexander Zhivotovsky, advised by Russian chess master Alexander Bitman and three-time world champion Mikhail Botvinnik.

At the end of 1966 a four game match began between the Kotok-McCarthy-Program, running on an IBM 7090 computer, and the ITEP Chess Program on a Soviet M-20 computer. The match played over nine months was won 3-1 by the ITEP program, despite playing on slower hardware.

By 1971, Mikhail Donskoy joined with Arlazarov and Uskov to program its successor on an ICL System 4/70 at the Institute of Control Sciences, called Kaissa, which became the first World Computer Chess Champion in 1974 in Stockholm.

Since 1977, Arlazarov has been the head of the System Programming Department at Institute of System Analysis, where he led the development of the INES database management system, for the creation and implementation of which he and his staff received an award from the USSR Council of Ministers.

Arlazarov is one of the inventors of the Method of Four Russians.

== Selected publications ==
- Adelson-Velsky, Georgy; Arlazarov, Vladimir; Bitman, Alexander; Zhivotovsky, Alexander; Uskov, Anatoly (1970), Programming a Computer to Play Chess, Russian Mathematical Surveys, vol. 25, pp. 221–262, Bibcode:1970RuMaS..25..221A, doi:10.1070/RM1970v025n02ABEH003792, S2CID 250904205
- Adelson-Velsky, Georgy; Arlazarov, Vladimir; Donskoy, Mikhail (1975), "Some Methods of Controlling the Tree Search in Chess Program", Artificial Intelligence, 6 (4): 361–371, doi:10.1016/0004-3702(75)90021-1, ISSN 0004-3702 Reprinted in Computer Chess Compendium
- Adelson-Velsky, Georgy; Arlazarov, Vladimir; Donskoy, Mikhail (1977), "On the Structure of an Important Class of Exhaustive Problems and Methods of Search Reduction for them", Advances in Computer Chess, vol. 1
- Adelson-Velsky, Georgy; Arlazarov, Vladimir; Donskoy, Mikhail (1979), Jean Hayes Michie, Donald Michie and L.I. Mikulich (ed.), "Algorithms of adaptive search", Machine Intelligence, vol. 9, Chichester: Ellis Horwood, pp. 373–384
- Adelson-Velsky, Georgy; Arlazarov, Vladimir; Donskoy, Mikhail (1988), Algorithms for Games, New York, NY: Springer-Verlag, ISBN 3-540-96629-3
- Arlazarov, Vladimir; Futer, Aaron L. (1979), Jean Hayes Michie, Donald Michie and L.I. Mikulich (ed.), "Computer Analysis of a Rook End-Game", Machine Intelligence, vol. 9, Chichester: Ellis Horwood, pp. 361–371

== See also ==
- David Levy
