= Mikhail Donskoy =

Soviet and Russian computer scientist

Mikhail Vladimirovich Donskoy
- Михаил Владимирович Донской
- Born: August 8, 1948; Soviet Union
- Died: 13 January 2009 (aged 60); Moscow, Russia
- Education: Moscow State University
- Scientific career
- Fields: Computer science
- Workplaces: Institute of System Analysis (ISA)

Mikhail Vladimirovich Donskoy (Russian: Михаил Владимирович Донской), (8 August 1948 – 13 January 2009) was a Soviet and Russian computer scientist. In 1970 he graduated from Moscow State University and joined the Institute of Control Sciences of the USSR Academy of Sciences, where he became one of the lead developers of Kaissa, a computer chess program that won the first World Computer Chess Championship in 1974.

After the dissolution of the Soviet computer chess initiative in the beginning of the 1980s he went into development of databases. In 1994 he established his own company, DISCo (Donskoy Interactive Software Company), which, among other projects, developed the Symbian interface for ABBYY Lingvo dictionaries.

Donskoy died of cancer on January 13, 2009.
