= Mendel Balberyszski =

Mendel Balberyszski (October 5, 1894 in Vilnius – November 19, 1966 in Melbourne) was a Lithuanian Jew, Polish politician and survivor of the Holocaust in Lithuania. He is chiefly known today as the biographer of the destruction of the Vilna Ghetto in his book Stronger Than Iron – The Destruction of Vilna Jewry 1941-1945: An Eyewitness Account. It is the account of life and organization in the Small Ghetto from its day of formation until its liquidation, it is also the only complete historical record of the fate of the Jewish population of Vilna from the day of the arrival of the Germans, through the two Ghettos, the concentration camps in Estonia until the liberation of the surviving 84 Jews by the Soviet Army.

== Biography ==
He was a Yiddish orator and a member of the editorial staff of the Vilnius Yiddish newspaper Der Tog. He became a leading member of the Jewish Democratic Party, the Folkspartei. In these capacities he was a fervent advocate of the right of the Jewish community to cultural autonomy.

In 1925, Łódź he founded The Jewish Artisans and Small Business Association and became president of one of the largest Jewish charity organizations the Noten Lekhem.

Later in 1939 he became one of the leaders of the Polish Democratic Party, one of the three major political parties in pre-war Poland.

With the outbreak of the Second World War, he escaped from German-occupied Poland to return to his native Vilnius.

In June 1941, Germany occupied Lithuania. Soon after the Jews of Vilnius were herded into two ghettos. He became a member of the Advisory Council that was responsible for the administration of the small ghetto. After the liquidation of the small ghetto, he became an important figure in the large Vilna ghetto where he opposed the Judenrat's policy of co-operating with the Germans in the deportations of Jews.

After the war, he emigrated to Australia where he returned to active Jewish communal activities, founding the Association of Partisans and Camp Survivors of which he became the President. He was also President of the Carlton Hebrew Congregation, an official of the Jewish Community Council of Victoria, a contributor to the Jewish press and a sought after guest lecturer. The Balberyszski Jewish Bookstore which he acquired and expanded in the early 1950s became the focal point for the Yiddish speaking intellectuals and a communal landmark.
