= Automatic Digital Computer M-1 =

- Also known as: (ATSVM) M-1
- Developer: Energetics Institute of the USSR Academy of Sciences
- Released: 1951; 75 years ago
- Memory: 8 oscilloscope cathode-ray tubes (each holding 32 words, 25 bit each for a total fast memory of 256 machine words) (Electrostatic memory)

The project to build the M-1 or Automatic Digital Computer (ADC) M-1 (Russian: автоматическая цифровая вычислительная машина (АЦВМ) М-1, romanized: avtomaticheskaya tsifrovaya vychislitel'naya mashina (ATSVM) M-1) was completed at the end of 1951, at the Energetics Institute of the USSR Academy of Sciences.

== Overview ==
In charge of the Laboratory of Electrosystems was Isaak Semenovich Brook (or Bruk), who obtained the first domestic patent with the title "Digital Computer with Common Bus" in 1948.

Work to build the computer based on Brook's design began in 1950. Parts were very difficult to get due to postwar rationing. On the other hand, due to availability of copper oxide diodes which were brought as trophies from Germany, the machine had the lowest lamp count of contemporary designs, at 730. The memory was based on an original invention of an electrostatic memory using the ordinary oscilloscope cathode-ray tube. Each tube was capable of holding 32 words, 25 bit each. The computer had 8 such tubes for a total fast memory of 256 machine words.

The computer turned out to work rather reliably and was immediately put to practical use, for numerical calculations in nuclear physics. For a period of about a year this was the first and the only working digital computer in Russia, and one of the first in the world.
