= Evgenii Landis =

Soviet mathematician (1921–1997)

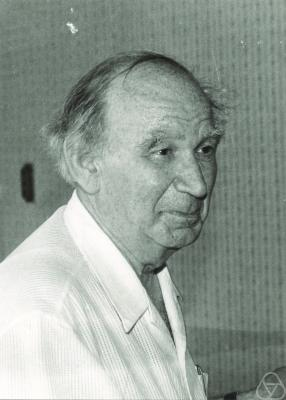
Landis at a conference on potential theory in Prague, 1987

Evgenii Mikhailovich Landis (Russian: Евгений Михайлович Ландис; 6 October 1921 – 12 December 1997) was a Soviet mathematician who worked mainly on partial differential equations.

== Life ==
Landis was born in Kharkiv, Ukrainian SSR, Soviet Union. He was Jewish. He studied and worked at the Moscow State University, where his advisor was Alexander Kronrod, and later Ivan Petrovsky. In 1946, together with Kronrod, he rediscovered Sard's lemma, unknown in USSR at the time.

Later, he worked on uniqueness theorems for elliptic and parabolic differential equations, Harnack inequalities, and Phragmén–Lindelöf type theorems. With Georgy Adelson-Velsky, he invented the AVL tree data structure (where "AVL" stands for Adelson-Velsky Landis).

He died in Moscow. His students include Yulij Ilyashenko and Boris Katz.
