= Boolean matrix =

In mathematics, a Boolean matrix is a matrix with entries from a Boolean algebra. When the two-element Boolean algebra is used, the Boolean matrix is called a logical matrix. (In some contexts, particularly computer science, the term "Boolean matrix" implies this restriction.)

Let U be a non-trivial Boolean algebra (i.e. with at least two elements). Intersection, union, complementation, and containment of elements is expressed in U. Let V be the collection of n × n matrices that have entries taken from U. Complementation of such a matrix is obtained by complementing each element. The intersection or union of two such matrices is obtained by applying the operation to entries of each pair of elements to obtain the corresponding matrix intersection or union. A matrix is contained in another if each entry of the first is contained in the corresponding entry of the second.

The product of two Boolean matrices is expressed as follows: $(AB)_{ij} = \bigcup_{k=1}^n (A_{ik} \cap B_{kj} ) .$

According to one author, "Matrices over an arbitrary Boolean algebra β satisfy most of the properties over β_{0} = {0, 1}. The reason is that any Boolean algebra is a sub-Boolean algebra of $\beta_0^S$ for some set S, and we have an isomorphism from n × n matrices over $\beta_0^S \ \text{to} \ \beta_n^S .$"
