= Aleksandr Kronrod =

Soviet mathematician and computer scientist (1921–1986)

- Александр Кронрод
- Born: October 22, 1921; Moscow, RSFSR
- Died: October 6, 1986 (aged 64); Moscow, Russian SFSR, Soviet Union
- Education: Moscow State University
- Known for: Mathematics; computer science; economics; medicine
- Awards: Stalin Prize; Order of the Red Banner of Labour
- Scientific career
- Workplaces: Institute for Theoretical and Experimental Physics (ITEP); Moscow Pedagogical Institute
- Doctoral advisor: Nikolai Luzin
- Doctoral students: Yevgeniy Landis

Aleksandr Semyonovich Kronrod (Russian: Александр Семёнович Кронрод; October 22, 1921 – October 6, 1986) was a Soviet mathematician and computer scientist, best known for the Gauss–Kronrod quadrature formula which he published in 1964. Earlier, he worked on computational solutions of problems emerging in theoretical physics. He is also known for his contributions to economics, specifically for proposing corrections and calculating price formation for the USSR. Later, Kronrod gave his fortune and life to medicine to care for terminal cancer patients. Kronrod is remembered for his captivating personality and was admired as a student, teacher and leader.

He is the author of several well known books, including "Nodes and weights of quadrature formulas. Sixteen-place tables" and "Conversations on Programming". A biographer wrote Kronrod gave ideas "away left and right, quite honestly being convinced that the authorship belongs to the one who implements them."

== Education ==
Kronrod was born on October 22, 1921 in Moscow. Growing up, he studied math with D. O. Shklyarsky in school and in 1938 entered the Department of Mechanics and Mathematics at Moscow State University. He did his first independent mathematical work as a freshman with Professor Alexander Gelfond. Kronrod was honored as a student with the first prize of the Moscow Mathematical Society and was the only person to win the prize twice.

During World War II he was rejected for military service because at the time students of higher classes were given deferments. Instead, they helped to build trenches around Moscow, and when he returned, Kronrod reapplied and was accepted. He served twice, and was injured twice. He was awarded several medals, including the Order of the Red Star. The second injury in 1943 hospitalised him for a year and he was discharged from the army in 1944. He felt the effects of the second injury for the rest of his life.

Kronrod was married and his son was born in 1943. During next four years he continued his studies at the University, simultaneously working, from 1945, in the computational branch of the nuclear energy research and development Kurchatov Institute. There he chose to leave pure mathematics and pursue computational mathematics. In his last undergraduate year, Kronrod studied with Nikolai Luzin the teacher of many of the Soviet Union's finest scientists. Kronrod and Georgy Adelson-Velsky were colleagues and Luzin's last students. He graduated with a thesis on the permutations of conditionally convergent series.

He then went on to advanced study and teaching. Like his teacher Luzin, Kronrod led a series of supplementary seminars for younger mathematics students. Unusually for the time, instead of students merely reporting on the content of courses, Kronrod made his students undertake training exercises, even proving basic theorems themselves. The preparation required for this reduced the numbers of participants, but those who remained, including Robert Minlos and Anatoli Vitushkin, derived great benefit. Vitushkin described him as "witty and friendly". At his own request, Kronrod was called simply "Sasha" by his students. He was considered to be a prophet in his field. The Kronod circle met between 1946 and 1953. Kronrod's position was formally at the Institute of Physics, which meant that his students had to register with other advisers, accounting for the decline of the circle into a series of friendly meetings. When he defended thesis in 1949, on the theory of functions of two variables, his committee including Mstislav Keldysh, Andrey Kolmogorov and Dmitrii Menshov bypassed the Candidate of Sciences degree and directly awarded him a Doctor of Sciences degree in the physical-mathematical sciences.

Kronrod taught at the Moscow Pedagogical Institute. Evgenii Landis was a student, early collaborator and one of his biographers.

During the 1960s he worked on mathematics education in high schools by organizing courses and teaching methods.

== Computer science ==
Kronod played an important role in building the first major Russian computer, Relay Computer RVM-1, though he liked to say his colleague N.I. Bessonov was the sole inventor.

At the Moscow Institute for Theoretical and Experimental Physics (ITEF or ITEP) during 1950–1955 Kronod collaborated with physicists, among them Isaak Pomeranchuk and Lev Landau. For providing theoretical physics with numerical solutions he received the Stalin Prize and an Order of the Red Banner of Labour.

In 1955, he first used an electronic computer at the Krzhizhanovsky laboratory of the Institute of Energy of the Academy of Sciences of the Soviet Union, later called the Institute for Electronic Control Machines.

He directed the mathematics division of ITEP. They could surpass the results achieved outside the USSR by far faster machines, in the case of CERN in Geneva, five hundred times faster. Requests for computation were analyzed and sometimes solved by other means. The equipment was maintained and there were almost no hardware malfunctions. A policy said finished programs had to be re-examined if they ran for more than ten minutes.

program written by (a male name)

coded by (a female name)

coding checked by (a female name)

punched by (a female name)

punching checked by (a female name)

— Typical appearance of a program-writing form in Kronrod's department at ITEP, as remembered by Landis and Yaglom.

Kronrod rewarded accuracy. He held what today are controversial views on the role of gender in computing. He employed women in ITEP's coding and card punching groups, believing that female computing staff members are more accurate than males. He also believed that in order to think, the male scientists qualified to use the computers needed to be free from operating them. The women did the input and quality assurance side by side with the men and for each month without an error received a 20% raise in salary.

He applied computing resources to the USSR planned economy and to cancer research. He served with Leonid Kantorovich and others on a cabinet ministry commission and oversaw the computation of the country's material expenditures to correct price formation. Kronrod's student, the economist V. D. Belkin, further developed this work. At the Gertsen cancer research institute during the 1960s, with his student P. E. Kunin he studied the differential diagnostics of lung cancer and pneumonia to help doctors determine when surgery is needed.

== Artificial intelligence ==
Kronrod had a profound interest in artificial intelligence known in the USSR at the time as heuristic programming. He is well known for saying that "chess is the Drosophila of artificial intelligence." The comparison highlights how geneticists use Drosophila as a reliable, fast‑cycling model organism, and how AI researchers have used chess in much the same way — as a compact, manageable arena for experimentation. This quote graces the top of the American Association for Artificial Intelligence "Games & Puzzles" chess home page.

In 1965, ITEP challenged and in 1966–1967 defeated the American chess program Kotok-McCarthy. The developers included Adelson-Velsky who used Alexander Brudno's adversarial search algorithm and a "general recursive search scheme" by Kronrod. They were advised by Russian chess master A.R. Bitman and world champion Mikhail Botvinnik in what was the first test of Shannon brute force vs. selective search.

Kronrod's participation came at great cost. The physics users at ITEP complained, thinking that the lab was being used for game playing, when the division was writing the Crazy Eights card game and chess trying to teach a machine to think.

== End of a career ==
When the Communist Party reprimanded him in 1968 for cosigning a protest letter defending the mathematician and logician Alexander Yesenin-Volpin, the physicists at ITEP succeeded in expelling him from the institute. He was also dismissed from his part-time professorship at the Moscow Pedagogical Institute. The punitive measures did not end there. His chess‑programming group was transferred to the Institute of Control Sciences, a more suitable environment for emerging AI research, yet Kronrod himself was barred from joining them due to the political stigma associated with his having signed the protest letter. These developments marked the beginning of the decline of the career of this brilliant mathematician and computer scientist.

He then directed the mathematics laboratory at the Central Scientific Research Institute of Patent Information (CNIIPI) where he proposed patent reform to stimulate inventions. After gaining support he lost this position to an unsympathetic director. His last position was heading a Central Geophysical Expedition laboratory that processed drilling data where he made calculations for gas and oil exploration, but he was not challenged by this work. He re-examined his goals and soon changed course.

== Medicine ==
Kronrod decided that his best work was to help others and most importantly the terminally ill. He spent his fortune developing milil from a sour milk extract for cancer patients, to fill a shortage of anabol, an expensive drug developed in small quantities by his acquaintance Bogdanov in Bulgaria. He was promised but never acquired an animal testing laboratory so he tested the medicine on himself. Kronrod had no medical degree but he was well-informed in medicine and administered his treatments with the assistance of physicians. Milil was a last resort for seriously ill patients and was administered by physicians; in one case in a hospital ward A.A. Vishnevskiy reserved for treatments by Kronrod's method. Kronrod himself never gave the drug to patients and through physicians gave it away free. The drug was unapproved and a criminal case was brought against him. He regained his research records when a relative of the plaintiff required milil for treatment and the case was dismissed.

== Strokes and death ==
He slowly recovered when a stroke took his speech and ability to read and write but was forced to resign at the Central Geophysical Expedition and stop all work on math. He saved his own life by asking to be soaked in a tub of very hot water for several hours after a second stroke. He died on 6 October 1986 of a third stroke.
