= Sargon (chess) =

Video game series

- Book cover art that was also used in the cassette inlays
- Developers: Dan Spracklen; Kathleen "Kathe" Spracklen
- Release: 1978
- Genre: Strategy

Sargon (stylized in all caps) is a line of chess-playing software for personal computers. The original Sargon from 1978 was written in assembly language by Dan and Kathleen "Kathe" Spracklen for the Z80-based Wavemate Jupiter II.

== History ==
Apple II version

Sargon was introduced at the 1978 West Coast Computer Faire where it won the first computer chess tournament held strictly for microcomputers, with a score of 5–0. This success encouraged the authors to seek financial income by selling the program directly to customers. Since magnetic media were not widely available at the time, the authors placed an advert in Byte magazine selling for $15 photocopied listings that would work in any Z80-based microcomputer. Availability of the source code allowed porting to other machines. For example, the March–April 1979 issue of Recreational Computing describes a project that converted Sargon to an 8080 program by using macros. Later the Spracklens were contacted by Hayden Books and a book was published.

=== Commercialization ===
The notation screen from Sargon I for the Apple II

When magnetic media publishing became widely available, a US Navy petty officer, Paul Lohnes, ported Sargon to the TRS-80, altering the graphics, input, and housekeeping routines but leaving the Spracklens' chess-playing algorithm intact. Paul consulted with the Spracklens, who were both living in San Diego at the time, to make the TRS-80 version an instant success with the help of Hayden Book's newly established software division: Hayden Software. Paul was not involved in further refinements to the TRS-80 version due to his reassignment to sea duty shortly after signing the deal with Hayden Software.

In the early 1980s, SARGON CHESS was ported to the Nascom (by Bits & PCs, 1981), Exidy Sorcerer, and Sharp MZ 80K. A complete rewrite was necessary later for the Apple II, programmed by Kathleen's brother Gary Shannon. Both were published by Hayden Software.

=== Improved versions ===
The Spracklens made significant improvements on the original program and released Sargon II. J. Mishcon reviewed Sargon II in the October 1980 issue of The Space Gamer magazine, stating that the program beat him regularly on level 5, which took 40 minutes per move. He often beat the program at level 3—when it considered moves for about two minutes—and stated that "Level 0 is an idiot but responds instantly". (Note: Mishcon stated, "As a reference, I play medium chess, know a few openings, and play regularly with a guy rated 1200+ by the United States Chess Federation.")

Sargon 2.5, sold as a ROM module for the Chafitz Modular Game System, was identical to Sargon II but incorporated pondering. It received a 1641 rating at the Paul Masson tournament in June–July 1979, and 1736 at the San Jose City College Open in January 1980.

Sargon 3.0 finished in seventh place at the October 1979 North American Computer Chess Championship. The competition had improved, but 3.0 drew against Cray Blitz and easily defeated Mychess, its main microcomputer rival. In December, 3.0 easily won the second microcomputer championship in London.

Sargon III was a complete rewrite. Instead of an exchange evaluator, this version used a capture search algorithm. Also included was a chess opening repertoire. This third version was written originally for the 6502 assembler. In 1978, Sargon was converted to Z80 mmemonics/assembler code by Paul H. Lohnes, as self taught computer enthusiast while he was still in the US Navy. He sold the publishing rights to Hayden Software for the Radio Shack TRS-80 platform. It was commercially published for other computing platforms by Hayden Software in 1983. Apple contacted the Spracklens and, after a port for 68000 assembly, Sargon III was the first third-party executable software for the Macintosh.

== Legacy ==
After the demise of Hayden Software, later chess programs were also released under the name Sargon, including Sargon 4 (Spinnaker Software), Sargon V (Activision) and a CD-i title simply named Sargon Chess. The CD-i game received 75% from the French magazine Génération 4. A compilation titled 4-in-1 Fun Pak was released for the Game Boy in 1992. One of the games in the compilation is Sargon Chess.

The Spracklens concurrently wrote the engines for the dedicated chess computers produced by Fidelity Electronics, which won the first four World Microcomputer Chess Championships.

=== The Botvinnik game ===
Animation of game against Botvinnik

The three-time world chess champion Mikhail Botvinnik played a game with Sargon in 1983 at Hamburg. He did not play his best moves but only tested the program's capabilities. Botvinnik himself was also involved in chess program development.

White: Mikhail Botvinnik

Black: SARGON

Hamburg, 1983

1.c4 e5 2.Nc3 d6 3.g3 Be6 4.Bg2 Nc6 5.d3 Nf6 6.f4 Be7 7.Nf3 O-O 8.O-O Qd7 9.e4 Bg4 10.h3 Bxh3 11.f5 Bxg2 12.Kxg2 Nb4 13.a3 Na6 14.b4 c5 15.b5 Nc7 16.Rh1 a6 17.b6 Nce8 18.Ng5 Qc6 19.Rb1 Bd8 20.Nd5 h6 21.Nf3 Nxd5 22.exd5 Qd7 23.g4 a5 24.Nd2 Ra6 25.Ne4 Rxb6 26.Rxb6 Bxb6 27.f6 Nxf6 28.Nxf6+ gxf6 29.Bxh6 Re8 30.Qf3 Bd8 31.Qh3 Qa4 32.Bd2 Kf8 33.Rf1 Kg8 34.Qh6 Qd7 35.Kg3 f5 36.Rh1 f4+ 37.Kf3 1-0
