= Sargon II (video game) =

1979 video game

- VIC-20 cover art
- Developers: Dan Spracklen, Kathe Spracklen
- Publishers: Hayden Software, Spinnaker Software, Commodore International
- Series: Sargon
- Platforms: Apple II, Atari 8-bit, CP/M, Commodore 64, TRS-80, VIC-20
- Release: 1979
- Genre: Strategy

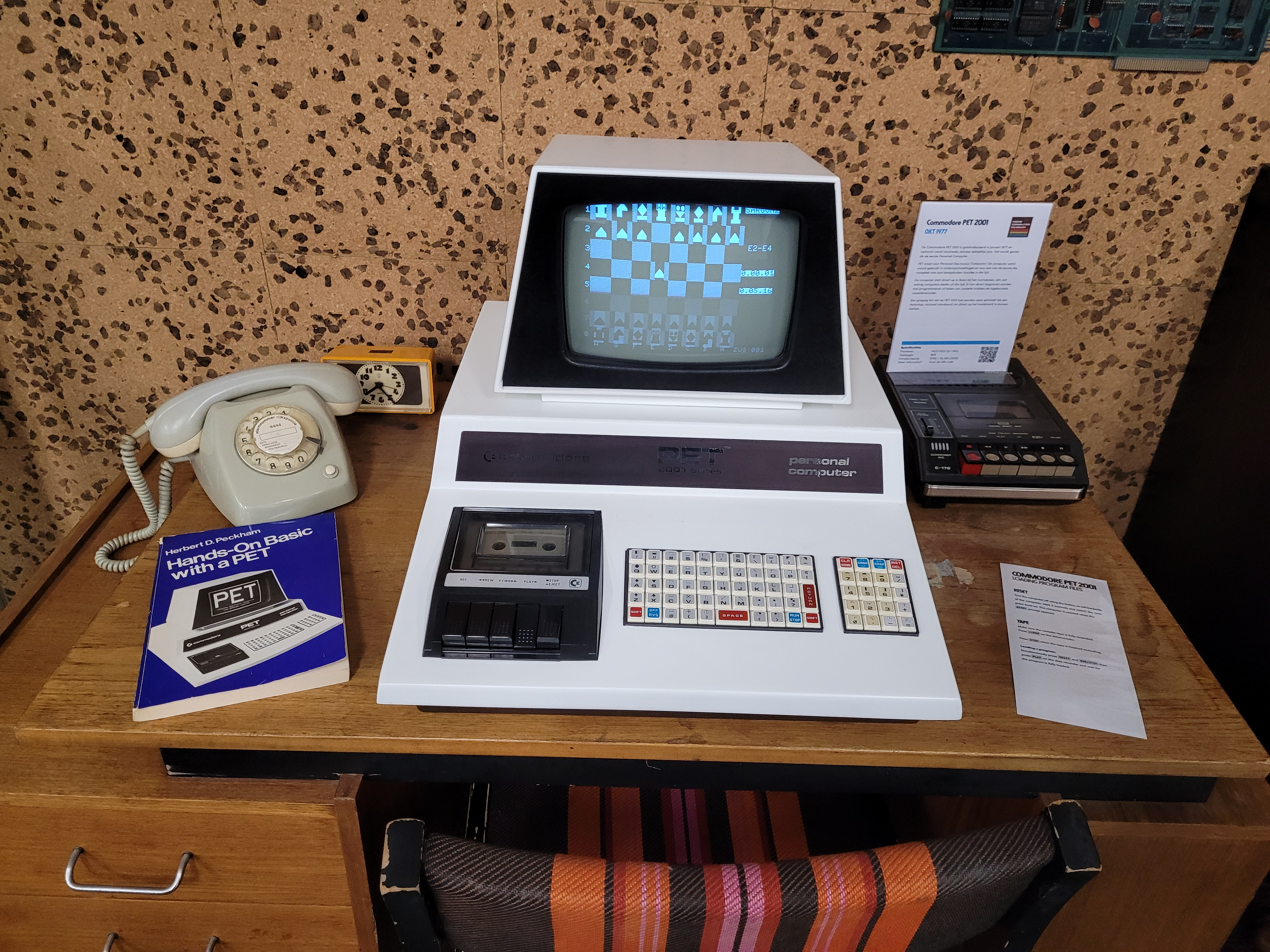
Sargon II running on a Commodore PET 2001

Sargon II is a sequel to Sargon. Both are computer chess programs for home computers.

== Development ==
The Spracklens, developers of Sargon, made significant improvements and released Sargon II. In 1978 Sargon II tied for third at the ninth North American Computer Chess Championship despite being seeded ninth of 12 entries. It finished only behind Belle and Chess 4.7, and defeated AWIT—running on a $5 million Amdahl mainframe—amazing the audience. That year the Spracklens published a series of articles in BYTE on computer chess programming, stating "we think it would be nice if not everyone had to reinvent the wheel".

Sargon II was ported to a variety of personal computers popular in the early 1980s. The game engine has multiple levels of lookahead to make it more accessible to beginning chess players. BYTE in 1980 estimated that Sargon II had a 1500 rating at the highest tournament-time difficulty level, and speculated that it was the best chess program for sale, including dedicated devices.

Sargon 2.5, sold as a ROM module for the Chafitz Modular Game System, is identical to Sargon II but adds pondering. It received a 1641 rating at the Paul Masson tournament in June–July 1979, and 1736 at the San Jose City College Open in January 1980.

== Reception ==
J. Mishcon reviewed The Software Exchange's Sargon II for the TRS-80 and Apple II in The Space Gamer No. 32 (1980). Mishcon commented that "This effort stands strongly in the small group of programs that set industry standards. It is a competent computer opponent in the incredibly complex world of chess. Highly recommended for everyone short of the chess master". John Martarello in BYTE that year stated "buy it. Sargon II is everything Sargon I should have been ... Nearly every deficiency of Sargon has been corrected". While vulnerable to the fried liver attack and other human strategies, and unable to recognize a two-king draw, Sargon II was the first computer program that he found able to trap the opponent. Martarello concluded that the game "is about all we computer chess players could wish for". He also favorably reviewed the Sargon 2.5 for the Chafitz Modular Gaming System, stating that its faster performance and addition of pondering resulted in "small yet definite" chess improvement. Martarello nonetheless advised Sargon II owners to "wait for Sargon 3" because of the cost of the Chafitz system.

Ahoy! in 1984 stated that the VIC-20 version of Sargon II's "chess-playing capability is excellent" and a bargain compared to dedicated chess computers, and gave a similarly favorable review of the Commodore 64 version. The Addison-Wesley Book of Atari Software 1984 gave the game an overall A− rating, stating that only Chess 7.0 was superior on a microcomputer and concluding that it "is a very worthy opponent for any chess enthusiast". Tim Harding in 1985 called Sargon II the first "halfway competent chess program" for home computers. He stated that "in early 1984 the VIC/Sargon II combination was still among the strongest home computer chess programs" despite its age, with "many features superior to today's weaker amateur programs".

Ian Chadwick for Moves issue #56 said that "If you want to see what the fuss is all about, and try your hand at a game which must be considered state-of-the-art in computer programming, then Sargon II is the programme to get."
