= Sargon 4 =

1988 video game

- Publisher: Spinnaker Software
- Platforms: Classic Mac OS, MS-DOS
- Release: December 1988
- Genre: Strategy
- Modes: Single-player, multiplayer

Sargon 4 is a chess video game published by Spinnaker Software in 1988 for Classic Mac OS and MS-DOS. It is part of the Sargon series and follows Sargon III.

== Gameplay ==
Sargon 4 is a game in which 107 classic chess games taken from 1851 to 1980 are available to be replayed.

== Reception ==
Roy Wagner reviewed the game for Computer Gaming World, and stated that "Sargon 4 has a long standing reputation, but that alone will not give you everything that's wanted in a program. This is not to say that Sargon 4 is not a good purchase. It is an outstanding chess playing partner, but lacks the features of the competition." Atari ST magazine STart reviewed the Macintosh version and said "Sargon IV may be the best chess game you can run on an ST–but only if you use a Mac emulator like Magic Sac or Spectre 128."
