= Blackjack Master =

1981 video game

- Publisher: Hayden Books
- Platform: TRS-80
- Release: 1981
- Genre: Casino

Blackjack Master is a video game published by Hayden Books for the TRS-80 in 1981.

== Gameplay ==
Blackjack Master is a game in which the player has a bankroll of $100,000 USD for blackjack.

== Reception ==
Richard McGrath reviewed the game for Computer Gaming World, and stated that "if you're a reasonably capable programmer and an avid blackjack player, then this program may be your guidebook on the road to riches."
