= Kaissa =

Chess program

Kaissa (Russian: Каисса) was a chess program developed in the Soviet Union in the 1960s. It was named so after Caissa, the goddess of chess. Kaissa became the first world computer chess champion in 1974 in Stockholm.

== History ==
By 1967, a computer program by Georgy Adelson-Velsky, Vladimir Arlazarov, Alexander Bitman and Anatoly Uskov on the M-2 computer in Alexander Kronrod’s laboratory at the Institute for Theoretical and Experimental Physics had defeated Kotok-McCarthy running on the IBM 7090 at Stanford University. By 1971, Mikhail Donskoy joined with Arlazarov and Uskov to program its successor on an ICL System 4/70 at the Institute of Control Sciences. In 1972 the program played a correspondence match against readers of popular Russian newspaper, Komsomolskaya Pravda. The readers won, 1½-½. It was the journalists of Komsomolskaya Pravda who gave the program its name, Kaissa.

Kaissa became the first world computer chess champion in 1974 in Stockholm. The program won all four games and finished first ahead of programs "Chess 4", "CHAOS" and "Ribbit", which got 3 points. After the championship, Kaissa and Chess 4 played a game, which ended in a draw. The success of Kaissa can be explained by the many innovations it introduced. It was the first chess program to use bitboards. Kaissa contained an opening book with 10,000 moves, had a permanent brain during opponents' moves, used a novel algorithm for move pruning, null-move heuristic, and had sophisticated algorithms for time management. All this is common in modern computer chess programs, but was new at that time.

The last time when Kaissa participated in WCCC was its third championship, 1980 in Linz, where it finished tied for sixth to eleventh place in a field of eighteen competitors. The development of Kaissa was stopped after that due to a decision by Soviet government that the programmer's time was better spent working on practical projects rather than chess.

An IBM PC version of Kaissa was developed in 1990. It took fourth place in the 2nd Computer Olympiad in London in 1990.

== Notable games ==
Duchess – Kaissa
Second computer chess championship
Toronto, 1977

Position: a8 white queen, g8 black king, e7 black rook, f7 black pawn, h7 black pawn, b6 black pawn, d6 black queen, f6 black bishop, g6 black pawn, b5 white bishop, d5 black knight, d4 white pawn, e4 black pawn, g4 white pawn, e3 white bishop, h3 white pawn, a2 white pawn, b2 white pawn, f2 white pawn, c1 white rook, g1 white king

Kaissa played 34...Re8! here. It saw the obvious 34...Kg7 could be answered with 35.Qf8+!! leading to a forced checkmate.

The second computer chess championship in 1977 in Toronto, featured an unusual game by Kaissa. In the diagram at right, Kaissa (black) was well ahead of its opponent, DUCHESS from Duke University. Kaissa was well ahead on the chess clock, but it gave away a rook with 34...Re8 and lost afterwards. After programmers entered the obvious move 34...Kg7 into the program, Kaissa explained why it did not play it: 34...Kg7 35. Qf8+!! Kxf8 36. Bh6+ Bg7 37. Rc8+ and White checkmates in two moves. This caused a sensation and was published in many chess magazines of that time. None of the human spectators present saw this nice queen sacrifice. Despite this, Kaissa finished the tournament tied for second place with DUCHESS, behind Chess 4.6.

== See also ==
- Chess engine
