= How About a Nice Game of Chess! =

1984 video game

How About A Nice Game of Chess!
- Publisher: Odesta
- Platforms: Apple II, Commodore 64
- Release: 1984
- Genre: Board game

How About a Nice Game of Chess! is a 1984 video game published by Odesta.

== Features ==
How About a Nice Game of Chess! is a game in which the player can replay earlier moves, switch sides with the computer, ask the computer for advice, or play against a human opponent with the computer as a referee.

== Reception ==
Bob Proctor reviewed the game for Computer Gaming World, and stated that "You have no excuse not to learn the game with this package on your shelf. There is a complete on-screen tutorial that covers how the pieces move and the rules of the game."
