= Joseph Henry Condon =

American computer scientist

- Born: February 15, 1935; Princeton, New Jersey, United States
- Died: January 2, 2012 (aged 76)
- Citizenship: United States
- Education: Johns Hopkins University （Physics, 1958; Northwestern University （Ph.D. Physics, 1963
- Known for: magnetic domains digital telephone switching Belle (chess machine); Unix
- Scientific career
- Fields: Computer science, Engineering, Physics
- Workplaces: Bell Labs

Joseph Henry 'Joe' Condon (born February 15, 1935 – January 2, 2012) was an American computer scientist, engineer and physicist, who spent most of his career at Bell Labs. The son of Edward Condon (a distinguished American nuclear physicist, pioneer in quantum mechanics and a participant in the development of radar and nuclear weapons during World War II as part of the Manhattan Project) and Emilie Honzik Condon, he was named after the 19th-century American physicist Joseph Henry. He is of Irish descent through his father.

== Education ==
Condon developed an interest in physics and electronics at an early age and credited his introduction to analytical thinking to an anonymous instrument maker. He attended Johns Hopkins University and received his BS degree in physics in 1958, and Northwestern University where he received a Ph.D. in physics in 1963.

== Career ==
After graduate school, Condon joined the Metallurgy Research Division of AT&T Bell Laboratories at Murray Hill, New Jersey. He arrived about the same time that the division split. Formerly physics, metallurgy, and chemistry were under one executive director. After the split, physics had its own director, and chemistry and metallurgy were under another. He worked for five years on solid-state physics and metals at low temperatures — electronic band structure of metals by means of the oscillatory diamagnetic susceptibility (the De Haas–van Alphen effect). His studies in beryllium and silver (1966—1968) showed that magnetic domains (later called 'Condon domains') form in non-ferromagnetic metals when the oscillating differential magnetic susceptibility is greater than unity. He developed the theory and verified it experimentally.

Condon then became interested more in electronics engineering, moving out of physics. He was exposed to UNIX on the Honeywell 516 machines in the early 1970s.

I understand mostly what goes on in that black box all the way through wave equations through the circuitry. My problem was to abstract away the detail. Literally, yeah I know what goes on. How the servos work to run the arms of the disk drive, coding.

— Joseph Henry Condon

In the 1960s, Condon contributed to the development of local area network digital telephone switching. Condon and Ken Thompson promoted the use of the C programming language for AT&T's switching system control programs. Condon acquired a small AT&T PBX (telephone switch) that handled about 50 phones; he made the necessary hardware changes and Thompson wrote the necessary software programs. The PBX code rewrite in C was a success and hastened the adoption of C for all switching system software within AT&T.

Technological advances made great strides in reducing the costs of transmission. Which meant that we were making money hand over fist in transmission.

— Joseph Henry Condon

Circa 1968—1969, Condon was the head of department 13 which owned a PDP-7 computer. The computer was loaned to Dennis Ritchie and Ken Thompson, who used it to create the famous early computer game Space Travel and to port various features of the recently cancelled Multics project, developments which directly led to the development of the Unix operating system and all of its modern derivatives.

In 1975 Condon joined the Computer Research Center at Bell Labs where the C programming language and the UNIX operating system were created. Condon and his colleagues automated the laborious and error-prone task of manually converting drawings to fabricate circuit boards through their system, the Unix Circuit Design System (UCDS), enabling rapid prototyping.

In collaboration with Thompson, Condon created the chess-playing machine Belle. Condon designed custom hardware while Ken designed software.

The hardware evaluated board position, did piece move generation and used a cache memory for previously evaluated board positions. Belle’s hardware could evaluate millions of board positions and generate all legal chess moves every second. The control software selected the best current move. Belle was compact and easily portable and was entered in many chess tournaments where it achieved a master rating. Belle won the world computer chess championship in 1980 and the U.S. computer chess championships in 1978, 1980, 1981, 1982, and 1986.

— Physics Today

The first chess machine did not make much significant improvement in chess. It violated the rules of UNIX. It was one that touched the hardware directly.

— Joseph Henry Condon

In 1982 Condon collaborated with Andrew Ogielski to create the spin glass machine, a single-purpose computer "5-10 times faster than the Cray-1" designed to facilitate Monte Carlo calculations for theoretical physicists to determine the properties of a class of recently discovered complex magnetic materials such as spin glasses and various random antiferromagnets, thus combining his interests in digital systems and physics. In Condon's obituary, Physics Today called his work on the spin-glass machine a "classic" that "remain[s] accurate to this day, despite immense increases in computing power".

Condon retired in 1989 but continued to consult with Bell Labs for another 10 years.

== Death ==
Condon died on January 2, 2012.

== Personal character ==
Joe is said to have been a "natural teacher" who "drew on his deep understanding of physics when explaining a problem in either basic physics or digital design", in addition to having unlimited curiosity, extensive knowledge, and a delightful sense of humor. His designs were said to be parsimonious. His personal interests included American Indian crafts, classical music, the theater and to travel with his wife Carol in their RV. He was a Quaker and a frequent volunteer in the FISH Hospitality Program, a local charity providing shelter for homeless people and single mothers.
