= Championship Golf =

1982 video game

- Developer: Hayden Software
- Publisher: Hayden Software
- Platforms: Apple II, Atari 8-bit, Commodore 64
- Release: 1982: Apple II, Atari 8-bit 1983: C64
- Genre: Sports
- Modes: Single-player, multiplayer

Championship Golf is a sports video game published in 1982 by Hayden Software for the Atari 8-bit computers and Apple II. A Commodore 64 version followed in 1983.

== Gameplay ==
Championship Golf is a golf game which presents the course using both an overhead view and a side view.

== Reception ==
Stanley Greenlaw reviewed the game for Computer Gaming World, and stated that "The side view adds a degree of interest as you watch your ball fly into the air, down the fairway, and bounce to its stopping point. Unfortunately the game does not capitalize on this feature."
