= D. G. Champernowne =

English economist and mathematician

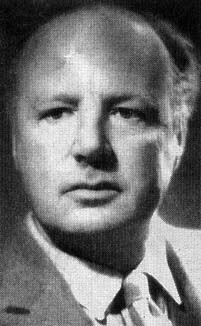
- Born: July 9, 1912
- Died: August 19, 2000 (aged 88)
- Education: University of Cambridge
- Known for: Champernowne constant; Turochamp
- Scientific career
- Workplaces: London School of Economics; University of Oxford; University of Cambridge
- Doctoral advisor: John Maynard Keynes
- Doctoral students: M. Hashem Pesaran

David Gawen Champernowne, FBA (9 July 1912 – 19 August 2000) was an English economist and mathematician.

== Early life and family ==
Champernowne was the only child of Francis Gawayne Champernowne (1866–1921), M.A. (Oxon.), a barrister and bursar of Keble College, Oxford, and his wife Isabel Mary, daughter of George Rashleigh, of Riseley, Horton Kirby, Kent. The Champernowne family were landed gentry, of Dartington, Devon; Francis Gawayne Champernowne was a grandson of Arthur Champernowne (1767–1819), M.P. for Saltash in 1806, who, born to Rev. Richard Harington, second son of Sir James Harington, 6th Baronet, had taken his maternal grandfather's name on inheriting his estates.

== Education and career ==
Champernowne was educated at Winchester and King's College, Cambridge, where he was a contemporary and friend of Alan Turing. After academic work there and at the London School of Economics, he was drafted into the statistical section of the prime minister's office at the beginning of the Second World War to supply quantitative information to help Winston Churchill make decisions; then, in 1941, he moved on to become a programme director in the Ministry of Aircraft Production.

He was a Fellow of Nuffield College, Oxford, Director of the Oxford Institute of Statistics during 1945–1948, and Professor of Statistical Economics at the University of Oxford (1948–1959), and Professor of Economics and Statistics (later Emeritus) at the University of Cambridge (1970–2000).

In 1953, he published a model of income distribution that generates the Pareto distribution.

He published work on what is now called the Champernowne constant in 1933, whilst still an undergraduate at Cambridge. In 1948, working with his old college friend Alan Turing, he helped develop one of the first chess-playing computer programs, Turochamp. The book for which he is most renowned, synthesising a life's work, Economic Inequality and Income Distribution (Cambridge University Press), was published in 1998.

His co-editors at the Economic Journal found him to be "modest, quirky and humorous".

== Death ==
Champernowne's grave is at the new church at Dartington in Devon, built by his family in the 1870s to replace the ancient church at Dartington Hall, the family seat.

== See also ==
- Champernowne distribution
- Harington baronets
