= Caïssa =

Goddess of chess

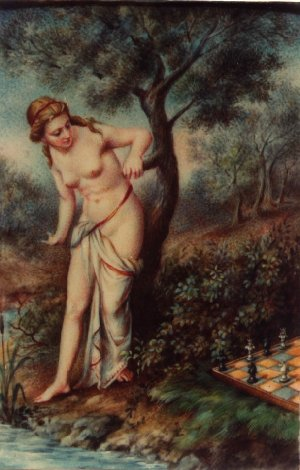
An illustration of Jones's Caïssa, author unknown

Caïssa is a fictional (anachronistic) Thracian dryad portrayed as the goddess of chess. The concept of a dryad of chess was first mentioned during the Renaissance by Italian poet Hieronymus Vida.

== Vida's poem ==
The concept of Caïssa originated in a 658-line poem called Scacchia Ludus published in 1527 by Hieronymus Vida (Marco Girolamo Vida), which describes in Latin Virgilian hexameters a chess game between Apollo and Mercury in the presence of the other gods, and among them a dryad of chess named Schacchia. In it, to avoid unclassical words such as rochus (chess rook) or alfinus (chess bishop), the rooks are described as towers (armored howdahs) on elephants' backs, and the bishops as archers:

Tum geminae velut extremis in cornibus arces
hinc atque hinc altis stant propugnacula muris,
quae dorso immanes gestant in bella Elephanti.

"Then twin, as if at the ends, citadels in the corners,
here and here stand ramparts with high walls,
which are carried into war on the back by immense elephants."

A leaked unauthorized 742-line draft version was published in 1525. Its text is very different, and in it the chess rook is a cyclops, and the chess bishop is a centaur archer.

The description of towers led to the modern name "castle" for the chess rook, and thus the term "castling", and the modern shape of the European rook chesspiece. Also for a time, some chess players in Europe called the rook "elephant" and the bishop "archer". In German, Schütze ("archer") became a general word for a chess bishop until displaced by Läufer ("runner") in the 18th century.

== William Jones's poem ==
The young English orientalist William Jones re-used the idea of a chess poem in 1763, in his own poem Caïssa or The Game at Chess written in English heroic couplets. In his poem, Caïssa initially repels the advances of the god of war, Mars. Spurned, Mars seeks the aid of Euphron, God of Sport (Jones's invention), brother of Venus, who creates the game of chess as a gift for Mars to win Caïssa's favor.

It is an unproven assumption that Jones's name "Caïssa" (ka-is-sa) is an equivalent to Vida's name "Scacchia" (ska-ki-a).

The English version of Philidor's 1777 Systematic introduction to the game and the analysis of chess contained Jones's poem. In 1851 the poem was translated into French by Camille Théodore Frédéric Alliey.

== Modern use ==
Caïssa is referred to in chess commentary.

- Garry Kasparov uses this reference now and again, especially in his five-volume work My Great Predecessors. He cites her as a metaphor for good luck – "Caïssa was with me" – especially in unclear situations, for example in sacrifices.
- The 1994 book The March of Chess Ideas by Anthony Saidy extensively uses Caïssa as well.
- T. R. Dawson extensively used Caïssa, both as a character to provide literary narrative to accompany his problem collections, and merely as a convenient personification of chess.

The computer program that won the first World Computer Chess Championship (in 1974) was named Kaissa.
