= Chess 7.0 =

1982 video game

- Developer: Larry Atkin
- Publisher: Odesta
- Platforms: Apple II, Atari 8-bit, Commodore 64, MS-DOS
- Release: 1982

Chess 7.0 is a 1982 computer chess game published by Odesta for Apple II, Atari 8-bit, Commodore 64, and MS-DOS.

== Gameplay ==
Chess 7.0 allows for 2 player play against another person, along with 1 player play versus the computer. It includes 17 different levels of skill, and includes 27 special features.

== Development ==
Chess 7.0 was written by Larry Atkin, a coauthor of Chess 4.7, the World Computer Chess Champion from 1977 to 1980.

== Reception ==
Floyd Mathews reviewed Chess 7.0 for Computer Gaming World in 1983. Stating that it was good for both novices and experts, Mathews also approved of the manual. He tested the game in postal chess against a former South Carolina state champion with experience playing against computers; the United States Chess Federation 1965-rated human resigned on the 28th move. Mathews concluded that "Chess 7.0 probably has the most powerful chess solitaire play capability now available for home computers. You will find it extremely entertaining even if chess is not your favorite game. I hope that more designers will try to reach this level of solitaire capability in other types of computer games".
