= Subrata Dasgupta =

Indian multidisciplinary scholar

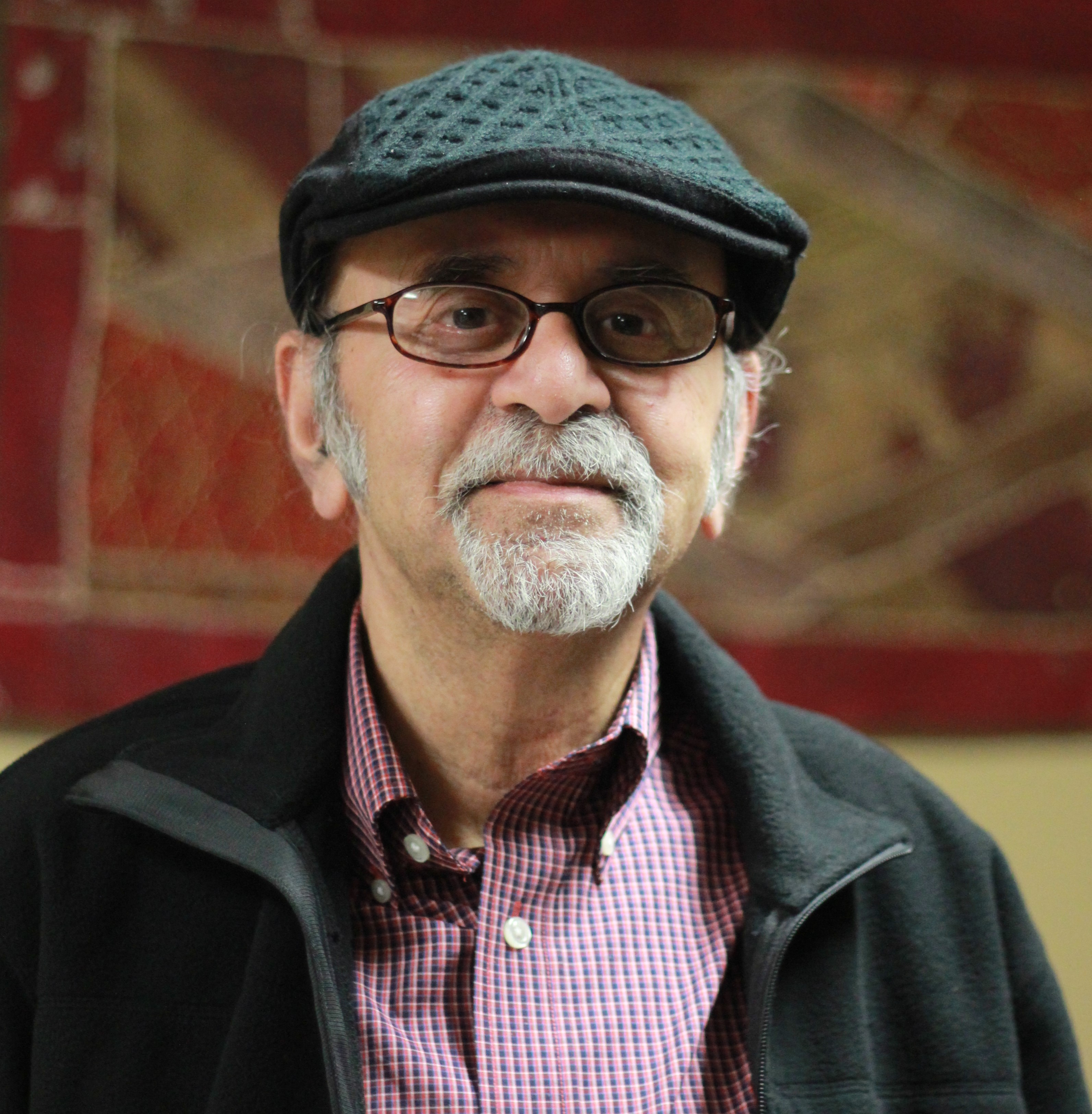
- Born: 1944 (age 80–81); Calcutta, British Raj
- Occupation(s): Computer scientist, creativity researcher, intellectual historian, writer
- Spouse: Sarmistha Dasgupta

Subrata Dasgupta is a bi-cultural multidisciplinary scholar, scientist, and writer. Born in Calcutta (in 1944), he was educated in England, India, and Canada.

== Education ==
He received his schooling at Bemrose School, Derby (UK) and La Martiniere Calcutta. He holds a first class bachelor of engineering (B.E.) degree in metallurgy from the University of Calcutta having studied at Bengal Engineering College (later, Bengal Engineering and Science University, now the Indian Institutes of Engineering Science and Technology), India’s second oldest engineering school. His graduate studies were at the University of Alberta, Edmonton, Canada, where he obtained the M.Sc. and Ph.D. degrees in computer science in 1974 and 1976 respectively.

== Career ==
=== Academic ===
Dasgupta is presently professor emeritus, School of Computing & Informatics, University of Louisiana at Lafayette, where from 1993 to 2018 he held the Computer Science Trust Fund Eminent Scholar Chair. From 1999 to 2013 he was also Director, Institute of Cognitive Science and Professor, Department of History. He had previously taught at Ohio State University, Simon Fraser University, University of Alberta, and the University of Manchester Institute of Science & Technology (where he was the first Dowty Professor of Computer Systems Engineering). He has been a visiting scholar at the Universities of Oxford and Cambridge, Universities of Aachen and Oldenberg, Simon Fraser University, Indian Institute of Science, and the Government of India's Center for the Development of Advanced Computing (C-DAC). He has served as a consultant for the United Nations Development Programme (UNDP). Dasgupta has featured in interviews and articles in multiple BBC Radio programs, British national newspapers and magazines, Indian national newspapers, and regional Spanish and Canadian newspapers. His biographical entries appear in Who’s Who in America, Who’s Who in the World, Writers Directory, and Contemporary Authors. He is the recipient of an Albert Nelson Marquis Lifetime Achievement Award from the Marquis Who’s Who Publication Board.

Subrata Dasgupta's research from 1972 through 1991 spanned such branches of computer science as computer architecture, microprogramming, hardware description languages and design theory. From 1992 his focus has been on the cognitive historical studies of creativity and the history and philosophy of science and technology.

=== Computer Science and the Sciences of the Artificial ===
Influenced by Herbert Simon’s seminal book The Sciences of the Artificial, Dasgupta has written extensively on the historical, epistemological and cognitive nature of the artificial sciences and, in particular, on computer science as a science of the artificial. His books include: The Design and Description of Computer Architectures (John Wiley, 1984), Computer Architecture: A Modern Synthesis. Volume 1: Foundations and Volume 2: Advanced Topics (John Wiley, 1989), Design Theory and Computer Science (Cambridge University Press, 1991), and It Began with Babbage : The Genesis of Computer Science (Oxford University Press, 2014) (selected as an 'Outstanding Academic Title for 2014' by the journal Choice), Computer Science: A Very Short Introduction (Oxford University Press, 2016; a volume in OUP’s best-selling and prestigious “Very Short Introduction” series), and most recently, The Second Age of Computer Science: From Algol Genes to Neural Nets (Oxford University Press, 2018).

=== Cognitive-Historical Studies of Creativity ===
He has published numerous papers and essays on the cognitive-historical-biographical aspects of creativity in art, science, technology and scholarship in such print journals as Perspectives on Science, Transactions of the Newcomen Society, Notes & Records of the Royal Society, Creativity Research Journal, Physics News, Physics of Life Reviews and the online journal PsyArt. His books include Creativity in Invention and Design (Cambridge University Press, 1994), Technology and Creativity (Oxford University Press, 1996), Jagadis Chandra Bose and the Indian Response to Western Science (Oxford University Press, 1999), Twilight of the Bengal Renaissance: R.K. Dasgupta and His Quest for a World Mind (Dey’s Publishing, 2005), The Bengal Renaissance: Identity and Creativity from Rammohun Roy to Rabindranath Tagore (Permanent Black, 2007), and Awakening: The Story of the Bengal Renaissance (Random House India, 2010), and, most recently, A Cognitive Historical Approach to Creativity (Routledge 2019) and The Renaissance Considered as a Creative Phenomenon (Routledge 2022).

=== Creative Writing ===
He has published three novels, Three Times a Minority (Writers Workshop Calcutta, 2003), The Golden Jubilee (Amaryllis, 2013), Voice of the Rain Season (Fingerprint, 2018), and a memoir of his childhood in England, Salaam Stanley Matthews (Granta, 2006).

== Books ==
- The Renaissance Considered as a Creative Phenomenon, 2022
- A Cognitive Historical Approach to Creativity, 2019
- Voice of the Rain Season (Novel), 2018
- The Second Age of Computer Science: From Algol Genes to Neural Nets, 2018
- Computer Science: A Very Short Introduction, 2016
- It Began with Babbage: The Genesis of Computer Science, 2014
- The Golden Jubilee (Novel), 2013
- The Awakening: The Story of the Bengal Renaissance, 2010
- Bengal Renaissance: Identity and Creativity from Rammohun Roy to Rabindranath Tagore, 2007
- Salaam Stanley Matthews (Memoir), 2006
- Twilight of the Bengal Renaissance: R.K. Dasgupta and his Quest for a World Mind, 2003
- Three Times a Minority (Novel), 2003
- Jagadis Chandra Bose and the Indian Response to Western Science, 2000
- Technology and Creativity, 1996
- Creativity in Invention and Design, 1994
- Design Theory and Computer Science (Cambridge Tracts in Theoretical Computer Science), 1991
- Computer Architecture: A Modern Synthesis, Volume 1: Foundations, 1988
- Computer Architecture, Volume 2: Advanced Topics, 1989
- Design and Description of Computer Architectures, 1984

== Personal Information ==
He is married to Sarmistha Dasgupta, daughter of the comparative literature scholar and intellectual historian Rabindra Kumar Das Gupta, the first director of the Indian National Library. He has two sons, Jaideep and Shome.
