= Sargon III =

1983 video game

- Developers: Dan Spracklen; Kathe Spracklen
- Publisher: Hayden Software
- Series: Sargon
- Platforms: Amiga, Apple II, Atari ST, Commodore 64, MS-DOS, Mac
- Release: 1983
- Genre: Strategy
- Modes: Single-player, multiplayer

Sargon III is a computer chess program. It is a sequel to Sargon II.

== Gameplay ==
Sargon III allots a time budget based on which level of play is chosen. It has nine levels, each of which can be played in hard or easy mode. It has an average response time of five seconds per move on the lowest level, and an unlimited amount of time on the highest level. Players can take back moves, ask for help, or force the computer's move. It features a 2-D display. It recreates 107 great chess matches for players to study.

== Development ==
Sargon III was a complete rewrite from scratch. Instead of an exchange evaluator, this version used a capture search algorithm. Also included was a chess opening repertoire. This third version was written originally for the 6502 assembler and was commercially published by Hayden Software in 1983. Apple contacted the Spracklens and, after a port for 68000 assembly, Sargon III was the first third-party executable software for the Macintosh.

== Reception ==
Video magazine listed Sargon III third on its list of best-selling video games in February 1985, and fourth on the best-seller list in March 1985, with II Computing listing the game second on its list of top Apple II games in October–November of the same year.

PC Magazine rated Sargon III 13.5 points out of 18. The reviewer criticized the "too abstractly drawn" pieces but praised the game's speed and skill, describing himself as "not a bad player" but only winning 10% of games at the lowest difficulty level.

Softalk said "Just the fact that Sargon III plays faster would be enough for many of the dedicated Sargon fans. But the extra added attractions figure to make this version irresistible."

Ted Salamone for Commodore Microcomputers said "Sargon III is one of the best Commodore 64 chess programs available. It is suitable for everyone from raw recruits on up."

Steve Panak for ANALOG Computing said "although Sargon III is an excellent program, its price makes it a best buy only for the chess enthusiast who desires a complete library."

James Delson for Family Computing said "All this flexibility makes Sargon III a great and patient opponent, and a fine tutor, as well."

John Krause for Compute!'s Gazette said "This sequel to the popular Sargon II chess program is an even tougher opponent and adds a smorgasbord of features."

Rod Lawton for ACE said "Sargon is easy enough to use, as versatile as any – but in terms of visual appeal is somewhere back in the Dark Ages."

David Morganstein for InCider said "This latest version is the most sophisticated of their efforts."
