= Alick Glennie =

British computer scientist

Alick Edwards Glennie (1925–2003) was a British computer scientist, most famous for having developed Autocode, which influential computer scientist Donald Knuth regarded as the first ever computer compiler.

Glennie worked with Alan Turing on several projects, including the Manchester Mark 1.

Glennie subsequently worked at Atomic Weapons Research Establishment (AWRE) where he was responsible in the early 1960s in developing FORTRAN compilers for several large computers inc. IBM 709, IBM 7090, IBM 7030 ("Stretch") and also ICT Atlas. He pioneered a method of developing the compiler for the Atlas on the IBM 7030 in advance of delivery of the Atlas, using an interpretive technique.
