= Computer code =

Computer code is a generic term for the instructions to be executed by a computer. It can refer to:

- Machine code – instructions native to a specific processor
- Bytecode – instructions for a theoretical processor, designed for efficient execution by a software interpreter
- Source code – human-readable instructions that will be converted to a byte code or a suitable machine code
- Pseudocode – human-readable instructions outlining the steps of an algorithm to other humans
