= Chess (Northwestern University) =

Chess program from the 1970s

Chess was a pioneering chess program from the 1970s, written by Larry Atkin, David Slate and Keith Gorlen at the Northwestern University in Evanston, Illinois. Chess ran on Control Data Corporation's line of supercomputers. Work on the program began in 1968 while the authors were graduate students at the university.

== History ==
The first competitive version was Chess 2.0 which gradually evolved to Chess 3.6 and was rewritten as the 4.x series. It dominated the first computer chess tournaments, such as the World Computer Chess Championship and ACM's North American Computer Chess Championship. At the ACM event, Chess won eight of the ten tournaments held from 1970 to 1979. NWU Chess adopted several innovative or neglected techniques including bitboard data structures, iterative deepening, transposition tables, and an early form of forward pruning later called futility pruning. The 4.x versions were the first programs to abandon selective search in favor of full-width fixed-depth searching.

In 1976, Chess 4.5 won the Class B section of the Paul Masson American Class Championships, the first time a computer was successful in a human tournament. The performance rating was 1950.

In February 1977, Chess 4.6, the only computer entry, surprised observers by winning the 84th Minnesota Open against competitors just under Master level. It achieved a USCF rating close to or at Expert, higher than previous programs' Class C or D, by winning five games and losing none. Stenberg (rated 1969) became the second Class A player to lose to a computer in a tournament game, the first being Jola.

Because of its Minnesota victory, grandmaster Walter Browne invited Chess 4.6 on a CDC Cyber 176 to his simultaneous chess exhibition; to Browne and others' surprise, Chess 4.6 defeated the United States chess champion. Also in 1977, Chess 4.6 won the second World Computer Chess Championship in Toronto, ahead of 15 other programs including KAISSA; Chess 4 had finished in second place to KAISSA at the first tournament in 1974. The favorite to win the tournament, like all but one other entry Chess 4.6 ran on a computer located away from the tournament; despite losing 90 minutes to hardware failure at the start of its first match the program rapidly defeated its opponent in 27 moves, earlier than any other first-round match. Chess 4.6 was capable of defeating 99.5% of United States Chess Federation-rated players under tournament conditions, and was stronger in blitz chess.

In 1978, the improved Chess 4.7—which had by now achieved a 2030 rating after 31 tournament games—played against David Levy who, in 1968 had wagered that he would not be beaten by a computer within ten years. Whereas Chess 4.7 had beaten Levy under blitz conditions, the bet involved forty moves over a two-hour period, the computer's choices being relayed by telephone from Minnesota to the board. Levy won the bet convincingly, defeating Chess 4.7 in a six-game match by a score of 4.5-1.5, The computer scored a draw in game two after getting a completely winning position but being outplayed by Levy in the endgame, and a win in game four—the first computer victory against a human master—when Levy essayed the very sharp, dubious Latvian Gambit. Levy wrote, "I had proved that my 1968 assessment had been correct, but on the other hand my opponent in this match was very, very much stronger than I had thought possible when I started the bet." He observed that, "Now nothing would surprise me (very much)." International Master Edward Lasker stated in 1978, "My contention that computers cannot play like a master, I retract. They play absolutely alarmingly. I know, because I have lost games to 4.7."

The last revision of the program was Chess 4.9 in 1979. It won the 10th ACM North American Computer Chess Championship tournament in Detroit and played at the expert level (2100). David Slate, with William Blanchard of Vogelback Computing Center at Northwestern University, later wrote a new program in Fortran, originally dubbed "Chess 5.0", but later renamed Nuchess. It competed from 1980 to 1984 but was never the dominating force of its predecessor. Its best competitive result was a second place finish in the 1981 North American Computer Chess Championship. During the 1980's the software paradigm of chess dominance gave way to specialized chess hardware machines like Belle, HiTech, and Chiptest, and the Northwestern series of programs was retired from competition after 1984.

In 1978 and 1979, Atkin and Peter W. Frey published in BYTE a series on computer chess programming, including the Pascal source for Chess 0.5, a chess engine suitable for microcomputers. Atkin authored Chess 7.0 for Odesta Corporation; he, Slate, and Frey also wrote microcomputer checkers and Reversi programs. Advertisements cited their Northwestern affiliation and authorship of Chess 4.7, "World Computer Chess Champion, 1977-1980".
