= Hayden Book Company =

American book publisher

Hayden Book Company (abbreviated Hayden Book Co.) was an imprint of MacMillan Computer Publishing USA that published computing books, with a particular emphasis on the Macintosh platform and desktop design. Video games and educational software for home computers, such as Championship Golf, Sargon II, and Sargon III, were published as Hayden Software.
