= Permanent brain =

Calculating during the opponent's turn

In turn-based games, permanent brain (also called pondering) is the act of thinking during the opponent's turn. Chess engines that continue calculating even when it is not their turn to play end up choosing moves that are stronger than if they are barred from calculating on their opponent's turn.

== Use with chess programs ==
The strength of chess programs depends very much on the amount of time allocated for calculating. Many chess programs use pondering to improve their strength. Current programs cannot create strategic plans, so a program simply tries to predict the opponent's move and begins to calculate its response. If the opponent's move has been guessed correctly, then the program continues to calculate. If the prediction fails, the program begins a new computation.

Pondering is less effective than normal thinking. For example, if the program guesses 25% of the opponent's moves correctly, the use of pondering is on average equivalent to increasing the normal calculating time by a factor of 1.25.

In chess games between two computers, pondering makes sense only if the competing chess engines use separate processors or cores. If they share the same core, the pondering program steals half of the time from the program thinking in the normal way and uses the stolen time less effectively. For this reason, chess GUIs have an option to turn the permanent brain off.
